= Akbarabad =

Akbarabad or Akberabad or Akbarabad-e may refer to:

== India ==
- Agra, called Akbarabad when it was the capital of the Mughal Empire

== Iran ==
=== Ardabil Province ===
- Akbarabad, Ardabil, a village in Germi County

=== Bushehr Province ===
- Akbarabad, Bushehr, a village in Jam County

=== Chaharmahal and Bakhtiari Province ===
- Akbarabad, Chaharmahal and Bakhtiari, a village in Lordegan County

=== East Azerbaijan Province ===
- Akbarabad, East Azerbaijan, a village in Meyaneh County

=== Fars Province ===
- Akbarabad, Darab, a village in Darab County
- Akbarabad-e Hashivar, a village in Darab County
- Akbarabad, Fasa, a village in Fasa County
- Akbarabad-e Sardasht, a village in Fasa County
- Akbarabad, Kavar, a village in Kavar County
- Akbarabad, Khonj, a village in Khonj County
- Akbarabad, Pasargad, a village in Pasargad County

=== Gilan Province ===
- Akbarabad, Lahijan, a village in Lahijan County
- Akbarabad, Rudsar, a village in Rudsar County

=== Golestan Province ===
- Akbarabad, Aqqala, a village in Aqqala County
- Akbarabad, Azadshahr, a village in Azadshahr County

=== Hamadan Province ===
- Akbarabad, Bahar, a village in Bahar County
- Akbarabad, Khezel, a village in Nahavand County
- Akbarabad, Zarrin Dasht, a village in Nahavand County
- Akbarabad, Tuyserkan, a village in Tuyserkan County

=== Isfahan Province ===
- Akbarabad, Mobarakeh, a village in Mobarakeh County
- Akbarabad, Nain, a village in Nain County

=== Kerman Province ===
- Akbarabad, Esmaili, a village in Anbarabad County
- Akbarabad-e Vaziri, a village in Anbarabad County
- Akbarabad-e Kahdan, a village in Baft County
- Akbarabad-e Mostowfi, a village in Fahraj County
- Akbarabad, Jiroft, a village in Jiroft County
- Akbarabad, Sarduiyeh, a village in Jiroft County
- Akbarabad, Kerman, a village in Kerman County
- Akbarabad-e Bahari, a village in Kerman County
- Akbarabad-e Arjomand, a village in Narmashir County
- Akbarabad-e Barkhordar, a village in Rafsanjan County
- Akbarabad-e Hejri, a village in Rafsanjan County
- Akbarabad, Rigan, a village in Rigan County
- Akbarabad, Gonbaki, a village in Rigan County
- Akbarabad, Shahr-e Babak, a village in Shahr-e Babak County
- Akbarabad-e Rah Niz, a village in Sirjan County
- Akbarabad, Najafabad, a village in Sirjan County
- Akbarabad, Zeydabad, a village in Sirjan County
- Akbarabad-e Now Kan, a village in Sirjan County
- Akbarabad, Zarand, a village in Zarand County
- Akbarabad-e Yek, a village in Zarand County

=== Kermanshah Province ===
- Akbarabad, Kangavar, a village in Kangavar County
- Akbarabad, Kermanshah, a village in Kermanshah County
- Akbarabad-e Khaleseh Tappeh Ginu, a village in Kermanshah County
- Akbarabad, Sarpol-e Zahab, a village in Sarpol-e Zahab County
- Akbarabad, Sonqor, a village in Sonqor County

=== Khuzestan Province ===
- Akbarabad, Khuzestan, a village in Izeh County

=== Kohgiluyeh and Boyer-Ahmad Province ===
- Akbarabad, Kohgiluyeh and Boyer-Ahmad, a village in Boyer-Ahmad County

=== Kurdistan Province ===
- Akbarabad, Kurdistan, a village in Divandarreh County

=== Lorestan Province ===
- Akbarabad, Delfan, a village in Delfan County
- Akbarabad, Dorud, a village in Dorud County
- Akbarabad, Khorramabad, a village in Khorramabad County
- Akbarabad, Kuhdasht, a village in Kuhdasht County
- Akbarabad, Selseleh, a village in Selseleh County

=== Markazi Province ===
- Akbarabad, Khomeyn, a village in Khomeyn County
- Akbarabad, Saveh, a village in Saveh County
- Akbarabad-e Nivesht, a village in Saveh County
- Akbarabad-e Qushchi, a village in Saveh County
- Akbarabad, Shazand, a village in Shazand County

=== Mazandaran Province ===
- Akbarabad, Chalus, a neighborhood of Hachirud city, in Chalus County
- Akbarabad-e Bala, a village in Chalus County
- Akbarabad-e Chalus, a village in Chalus County
- Akbarabad-e Pain, a village in Chalus County
- Akbarabad, Tonekabon, a village in Tonekabon County

=== North Khorasan Province ===
- Akbarabad, Esfarayen, a village in Esfarayan County

=== Qazvin Province ===
- Akbarabad, Qazvin, Iran
- Akbarabad, Rudbar-e Alamut, Qazvin, Iran

=== Razavi Khorasan Province ===
- Akbarabad, Kalat, a village in Kalat County
- Akbarabad, Kuhsorkh, a village in Kuhsorkh County
- Akbarabad, Miyan Velayat, a village in Mashhad County
- Akbarabad, Tus, a village in Mashhad County
- Akbarabad-e Toroq, a village in Mashhad County
- Akbarabad, Miyan Jolgeh, a village in MKiyqan Jolgeh County
- Akbarabad, Zeberkhan, a village in Zeberkhan County
- Akbarabad-e Now Deh, a village in Rashtkhvar County
- Akbarabad, Torbat-e Heydarieh, a village in Torbat-e Heydarieh County

=== Sistan and Baluchestan Province ===
- Akbarabad, Hirmand, a village in Hirmand County
- Akbarabad, Irandegan, a village in Khash County

=== South Khorasan Province ===
- Akbarabad, Birjand, a village in Birjand County
- Akbarabad, Khusf, a village in Khusf County
- Akbarabad, Tabas, a village in Tabas County

=== Tehran Province ===
- Nasim Shahr, formerly named Akbarabad, a city
- Akbarabad-e Kazemi, a village in Pishva County

=== West Azerbaijan Province ===
- Akbarabad, West Azerbaijan, a village in Khoy County

== Pakistan ==
- Akbarabad, Pakistan, a town and Union Council of Kasur District

== See also ==
- Akbarabadi
- Nazeer Akbarabadi (fl. 18th century), Indian poet
- Akbarabad-e Olya (disambiguation)
