= Qudratullah =

Qudratullah (Arabic: قدرة الله) is a masculine given name of Arabic origin meaning power of God. It may refer to:

== Historical ==
- Qudratullah Katchil Sultan Muhammad Dipatuan Kudarat, or just Muhammad Kudarat (1581–1671), Sultan of Maguindanao in the Philippines

== Contemporary ==
- Ghodratollah Alikhani (born 1939), Iranian cleric
- Ghodratollah Norouzi, Iranian politician
- Qudrat Ullah Shahab (1917–1986), Pakistani Urdu writer and civil servant
- Qudratullah Abu Hamza, Pashto Afghan Taliban politician
- Qudratullah Panjshiri, Taliban governor

== Places ==
- Qodratabad, Fahraj, Kerman Province
- Qodratabad, Narmashir, Kerman Province
- Qodratabad, Rafsanjan, Kerman Province
- Qodratabad, Azadegan, Rafsanjan County, Kerman Province
- Qodratabad, Rigan, Kerman Province
- Qodratabad, Khuzestan
- Qodratabad, Semnan
- Qodratabad, Nehbandan, South Khorasan Province

== See also ==
- List of Arabic theophoric names
