= Qodratabad =

Qodratabad or Qadratabad (Persian: قدرت اباد), also rendered as Qudratabad, may refer to:

- Qodratabad, Fahraj, Kerman Province
- Qodratabad, Narmashir, Kerman Province
- Qodratabad, Rafsanjan, Kerman Province
- Qodratabad, Azadegan, Rafsanjan County, Kerman Province
- Qodratabad, Rigan, Kerman Province
- Qodratabad, Khuzestan
- Qodratabad, Semnan
- Qodratabad, Nehbandan, South Khorasan Province
