= Najmabad =

Najmabad or Najamabad (Persian: نجم اباد) may refer to:

- Najmabad, Alborz
- Najamabad, Pasargad, Fars Province
- Najmabad, Qir and Karzin, Fars Province
- Najmabad, Shiraz, Fars Province
- Najmabad, Gilan
- Najmabad, Kerman
- Najmabad, Razmavaran, Kerman Province
- Najmabad, Markazi
- Najmabad, Qazvin
- Najmabad, Jafarabad, Qom Province
- Najmabad, Chenaran, Razavi Khorasan Province
- Najmabad, Gonabad, Razavi Khorasan Province
- Najmabad, Sabzevar, Razavi Khorasan Province
- Najmabad, Tehran
- Najmabad Rural District, in Alborz Province
