= Ravamharan =

Ravamehran روامهران
- Village
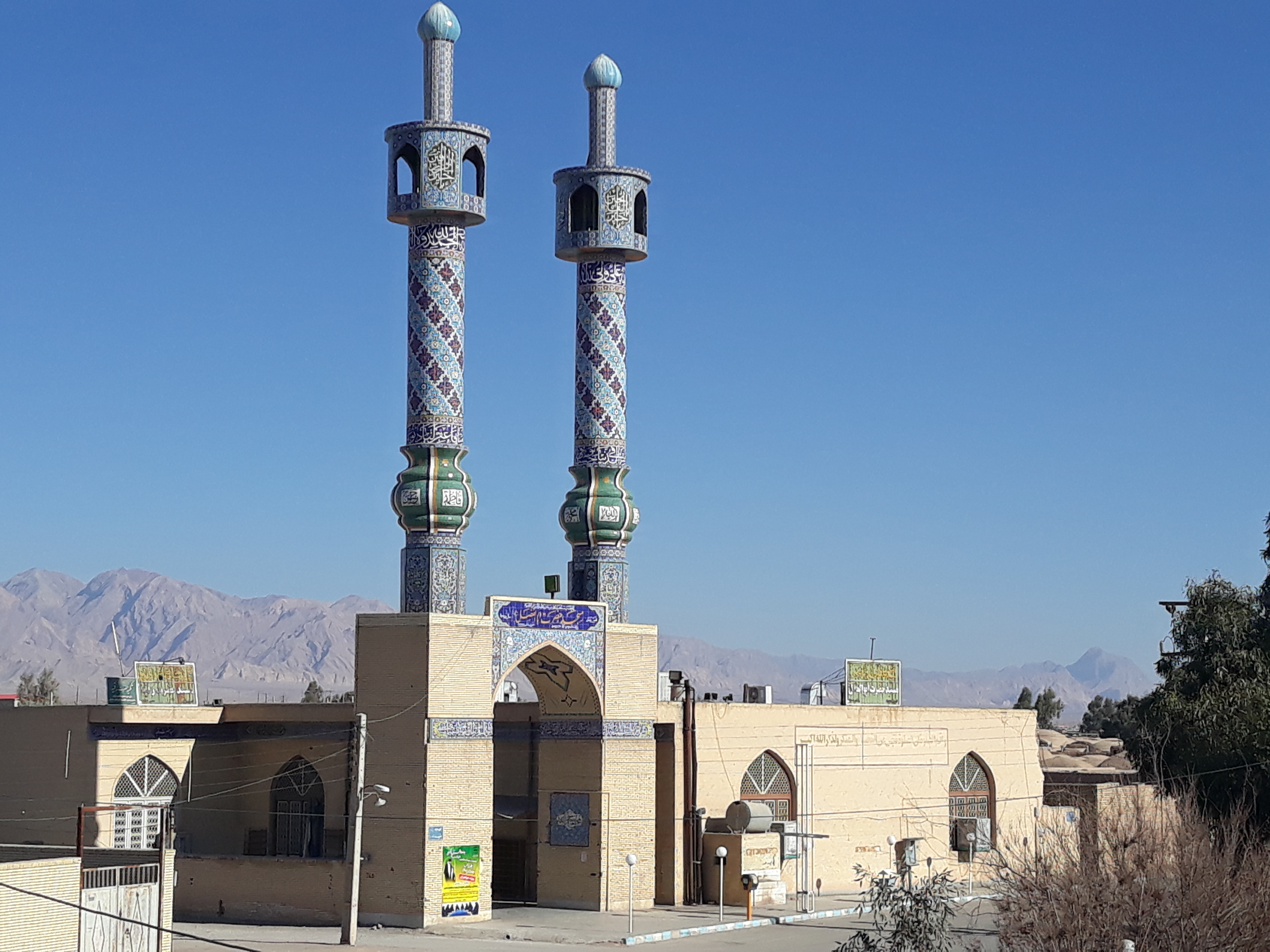

- Location within Iran
- Coordinates: 30°55′52″N 55°40′39″E
- Country: Iran
- Province: Kerman
- County: Rafsanjan
- Bakhsh: Nuq
- Rural District: Bahreman

Population (2016)
  - Total: 1,074
- Time zone: UTC+3:30 (IRST)
  - Summer (DST): UTC+4:30 (IRDT)

Ravamehran (Persian: روامهران) is a village in Iran, located in Bahreman Rural District, Nuq District, Rafsanjan County, Kerman Province. It is 70 kilometres (43 mi) from Rafsanjan, 5 kilometres (3.1 mi) from Bahreman and 45 kilometres (28 mi)from Anar, Iran. It had a population of 1,074 at the 2016 census.
