= Kabutar Khan =

Kabutar Khan or Kabutarkhan (Persian: كبوترخان) may refer to:

- Kabutar Khan, Kerman
- Kabutar Khan-e Olya, Khuzestan Province
- Kabutar Khan-e Sofla, Khuzestan Province
- Kabutar Khan Rural District, in Kerman Province

== See also ==
- Kabootar Khana, an area of Mumbai, India
