= Dughabad =

Dughabad (Persian: دوغ اباد) may refer to:

== Afghanistan ==
- Dughabad, Afghanistan

== Iran ==
- Dughabad, Jiroft, Kerman Province
- Dughabad, Rafsanjan, Kerman Province
- Dughabad, Rudbar-e Jonubi, Kerman Province
- Dughabad, Mahvelat, Razavi Khorasan Province
