= Eslamiyeh (disambiguation) =

Eslamiyeh is a city in South Khorasan Province, Iran.

Eslamiyeh (Persian: اسلاميه) may refer also to:

- Eslamiyeh, Fars
- Eslamiyeh, Ilam
- Eslamiyeh, Kerman
- Eslamiyeh, Kermanshah
- Eslamiyeh, Mashhad, Razavi Khorasan Province
- Eslamiyeh, Nishapur, Razavi Khorasan Province
- Eslamiyeh, Yazd
- Eslamiyeh Rural District, in Kerman Province
