= Behruziyeh =

Behruziyeh بهروزيه
- Village
- Location within Iran
- Coordinates: 30°31′49″N 55°59′11″E
- Country: Iran
- Province: Kerman
- County: Rafsanjan
- Bakhsh: Central
- Rural District: Azadegan

Population (2006)
  - Total: 27
- Time zone: UTC+3:30 (IRST)
  - Summer (DST): UTC+4:30 (IRDT)

Behruziyeh (Persian: بهروزيه, also Romanized as Behrūzīyeh) is a village in Azadegan Rural District, in the Central District of Rafsanjan County, Kerman Province, Iran. At the 2006 census, its population was 27, in 7 families.
