= Deh-e Poshteh =

Deh-e Poshteh ده پشته
- Village
- Location within Iran
- Coordinates: 30°02′08″N 56°03′45″E
- Country: Iran
- Province: Kerman
- County: Rafsanjan
- Bakhsh: Central
- Rural District: Sarcheshmeh

Population (2006)
  - Total: 11
- Time zone: UTC+3:30 (IRST)
  - Summer (DST): UTC+4:30 (IRDT)

Deh-e Poshteh (Persian: ده پشته, also Romanized as Dehposhteh) is a village in Sarcheshmeh Rural District, in the Central District of Rafsanjan County, Kerman Province, Iran. At the 2006 census, its population was 11, in 5 families.
