= Zanuqabad =

Zanuqabad زانوق اباد
- Village
- Location within Iran
- Coordinates: 30°56′05″N 55°39′50″E
- Country: Iran
- Province: Kerman
- County: Rafsanjan
- Bakhsh: Nuq
- Rural District: Bahreman

Population (2006)
  - Total: 127
- Time zone: UTC+3:30 (IRST)
  - Summer (DST): UTC+4:30 (IRDT)

Zanuqabad (Persian: زانوق اباد, also Romanized as Zānūqābād; also known as Zāghābād, Z̄ājābād, Zanoogh Abad, and Zāqābād) is a village in Bahreman Rural District, Nuq District, Rafsanjan County, Kerman Province, Iran. At the 2006 census, its population was 127, in 34 families.
