= Sadrabad, Nuq =

Sadrabad صدراباد
- Village
- Location within Iran
- Coordinates: 30°53′59″N 55°35′23″E
- Country: Iran
- Province: Kerman
- County: Rafsanjan
- Bakhsh: Nuq
- Rural District: Bahreman

Population (2006)
  - Total: 24
- Time zone: UTC+3:30 (IRST)
  - Summer (DST): UTC+4:30 (IRDT)

Sadrabad (Persian: صدراباد, also Romanized as Şadrābād) is a village in Bahreman Rural District, Nuq District, Rafsanjan County, Kerman Province, Iran. At the 2006 census, its population was 24, in 6 families.
