= Kowsar Riz =

Kowsar Riz كوثرريز
- Village
- Location within Iran
- Coordinates: 30°25′22″N 55°49′56″E
- Country: Iran
- Province: Kerman
- County: Rafsanjan
- Bakhsh: Central
- Rural District: Eslamiyeh

Population (2006)
  - Total: 1,561
- Time zone: UTC+3:30 (IRST)
  - Summer (DST): UTC+4:30 (IRDT)

Kowsar Riz (Persian: كوثرريز, also Romanized as Kows̄ar Rīz) is a village in Eslamiyeh Rural District, in the Central District of Rafsanjan County, Kerman Province, Iran. At the 2006 census, its population was 1,561, in 350 families.
