= Aliabad, Nuq =

Aliabad علي اباد
- Village
- Location within Iran
- Coordinates: 31°01′24″N 55°33′11″E
- Country: Iran
- Province: Kerman
- County: Rafsanjan
- Bakhsh: Nuq
- Rural District: Bahreman

Population (2006)
  - Total: 102
- Time zone: UTC+3:30 (IRST)
  - Summer (DST): UTC+4:30 (IRDT)

Aliabad (Persian: علي اباد, also Romanized as ‘Alīābād; also known as ‘Alīābād-e Bālā and Deh Bālā) is a village in Bahreman Rural District, Nuq District, Rafsanjan County, Kerman Province, Iran. At the 2006 census, its population was 102, in 23 families.
