= Darreh Dur =

Darreh Dur دره دور
- Village
- Location within Iran
- Coordinates: 30°33′19″N 56°18′09″E
- Country: Iran
- Province: Kerman
- County: Rafsanjan
- Bakhsh: Central
- Rural District: Darreh Doran

Population (2006)
  - Total: 509
- Time zone: UTC+3:30 (IRST)
  - Summer (DST): UTC+4:30 (IRDT)

Darreh Dur (Persian: دره دور, also Romanized as Darreh Dūr; also known as Dareh Dar, Darehdor-e Bālā, Dareh Dorr-e Bālā, Darreh Dar-e Bālā, and Darreh Dor) is a village in Darreh Doran Rural District, in the Central District of Rafsanjan County, Kerman Province, Iran. At the 2006 census, its population was 509, in 138 families.
