= Aliabad-e Yek, Rafsanjan =

Aliabad-e Yek علي اباد1
- Village
- Location within Iran
- Coordinates: 30°08′48″N 56°09′19″E
- Country: Iran
- Province: Kerman
- County: Rafsanjan
- Bakhsh: Central
- Rural District: Sarcheshmeh

Population (2006)
  - Total: 12
- Time zone: UTC+3:30 (IRST)
  - Summer (DST): UTC+4:30 (IRDT)

Aliabad-e Yek (Persian: علي اباد1, also Romanized as ‘Alīābād-e Yek; also known as ‘Alīābād) is a village in Sarcheshmeh Rural District, in the Central District of Rafsanjan County, Kerman Province, Iran. At the 2006 census, its population was 12, in 6 families.
