= Darreh-ye Jowz =

Darreh-ye Jowz دره جوز
- Village
- Location within Iran
- Coordinates: 30°36′55″N 56°14′30″E
- Country: Iran
- Province: Kerman
- County: Rafsanjan
- Bakhsh: Central
- Rural District: Darreh Doran

Population (2006)
  - Total: 178
- Time zone: UTC+3:30 (IRST)
  - Summer (DST): UTC+4:30 (IRDT)

Darreh-ye Jowz (Persian: دره جوز, also Romanized as Darreh Jowz; also known as Dareh Joz and Darjoz') is a village in Darreh Doran Rural District, in the Central District of Rafsanjan County, Kerman province, Iran. At the 2006 census, its population was 178, in 51 families.
