= Makhazen Naft =

Makhazen Naft مخازن نفت
- Village
- Country: Iran
- Province: Kerman
- County: Rafsanjan
- Bakhsh: Central
- Rural District: Eslamiyeh

Population (2006)
  - Total: 313
- Time zone: UTC+3:30 (IRST)
  - Summer (DST): UTC+4:30 (IRDT)

Makhazen Naft (Persian: مخازن نفت, also Romanized as Makhāzen Naft) is a village in Eslamiyeh Rural District, in the Central District of Rafsanjan County, Kerman Province, Iran. At the 2006 census, its population was 313, in 79 families.
