= Khuri, Iran =

Khuri خوري
- Village
- Country: Iran
- Province: Kerman
- County: Rafsanjan
- Bakhsh: Central
- Rural District: Sarcheshmeh
- Time zone: UTC+3:30 (IRST)
  - Summer (DST): UTC+4:30 (IRDT)

Khuri (Persian: خوري, also Romanized as Khūrī) is a village in Sarcheshmeh Rural District, in the Central District of Rafsanjan County, Kerman Province, Iran. At the 2006 census, its existence was noted, but its population was reported of 69 people currently living there.
