= Rukerd =

Rukerd روكرد
- Village
- Location within Iran
- Coordinates: 30°27′47″N 56°30′17″E
- Country: Iran
- Province: Kerman
- County: Rafsanjan
- Bakhsh: Central
- Rural District: Khenaman

Population (2006)
  - Total: 52
- Time zone: UTC+3:30 (IRST)
  - Summer (DST): UTC+4:30 (IRDT)

Rukerd (Persian: روكرد, also Romanized as Rūkerd; also known as Rood Kurd, Rūd Kerd, Rūgerd, Rūkerd-e Khenāmān, and Rūkīrd) is a village in Khenaman Rural District, in the Central District of Rafsanjan County, Kerman Province, Iran. At the 2006 census, its population was 52, in 19 families.
