= Udarj =

Ouderj اودرج
- Village
- Location within Iran
- Coordinates: 30°37′35″N 56°09′47″E
- Country: Iran
- Province: Kerman
- County: Rafsanjan
- Bakhsh: Central
- Rural District: Darreh Doran

Population (2006)
  - Total: 293
- Time zone: UTC+3:30 (IRST)
  - Summer (DST): UTC+4:30 (IRDT)

Ouderj (Persian: اودرج, also Romanized as Ouderj; also known as Udarj and Huderj) is a village in Darreh Doran Rural District, in the Central District of Rafsanjan County, Kerman Province, Iran. At the 2006 census, its population was 293, in 96 families.
