= Hoseynabad-e Emami =

Hoseynabad-e Emami حسين ابادامامي
- Village
- Location within Iran
- Coordinates: 30°58′59″N 55°35′22″E
- Country: Iran
- Province: Kerman
- County: Rafsanjan
- Bakhsh: Nuq
- Rural District: Bahreman

Population (2006)
  - Total: 36
- Time zone: UTC+3:30 (IRST)
  - Summer (DST): UTC+4:30 (IRDT)

Hoseynabad-e Emami (Persian: حسين ابادامامي, also Romanized as Ḩoseynābād-e Emāmī; also known as Deh-e Now, Deh-i-Nan, Deh-i-Nau, Deh Now, Hosein Abad Deh Now, Ḩoseynābād, and Ḩoseynābād-e Deh Now) is a village in Bahreman Rural District, Nuq District, Rafsanjan County, Kerman Province, Iran. At the 2006 census, its population was 36, in 8 families.
