= Mohammadabad-e Barkhordar =

Mohammadabad-e Barkhvordar محمدابادبرخوردار
- Village
- Location within Iran
- Coordinates: 30°50′15″N 55°43′12″E
- Country: Iran
- Province: Kerman
- County: Rafsanjan
- Bakhsh: Nuq
- Rural District: Bahreman

Population (2006)
  - Total: 124
- Time zone: UTC+3:30 (IRST)
  - Summer (DST): UTC+4:30 (IRDT)

Mohammadabad-e Barkhvordar (Persian: محمدابادبرخوردار, also Romanized as Moḩammadābād-e Barkhvordār and Moḩammadābād Barkhowrdār; also known as Moḩammadābād-e Harātī) is a village in Bahreman Rural District, Nuq District, Rafsanjan County, Kerman Province, Iran. At the 2006 census, its population was 124, in 32 families.
