= Darreh Ranj =

Darreh Ranj دره رنج
- Village
- Location within Iran
- Coordinates: 30°34′59″N 56°15′46″E
- Country: Iran
- Province: Kerman
- County: Rafsanjan
- Bakhsh: Central
- Rural District: Darreh Doran

Population (2006)
  - Total: 24
- Time zone: UTC+3:30 (IRST)
  - Summer (DST): UTC+4:30 (IRDT)

Darreh Ranj (Persian: دره رنج, also Romanized as Dareh Ranj) is a village in the Darreh Doran Rural District, in the Central District of Rafsanjan County, Kerman Province, Iran. At the 2006 census, its population was 24, in 9 families.
