= Galu Salar =

Galu Salar گلوسالار
- Village
- Location within Iran
- Coordinates: 30°25′36″N 56°27′28″E
- Country: Iran
- Province: Kerman
- County: Rafsanjan
- Bakhsh: Central
- Rural District: Khenaman

Population (2006)
  - Total: 131
- Time zone: UTC+3:30 (IRST)
  - Summer (DST): UTC+4:30 (IRDT)

Galu Salar (Persian: گلوسالار, also Romanized as Galū Sālār and Golūsālār; also known as Gulu Sālār and Kalū Sālār) is a village in Khenaman Rural District, in the Central District of Rafsanjan County, Kerman Province, Iran. At the 2006 census, its population was 131, in 46 families.
