= Dahanabad =

Dahanabad دهن اباد
- Village
- Location within Iran
- Coordinates: 30°26′09″N 55°51′37″E
- Country: Iran
- Province: Kerman
- County: Rafsanjan
- Bakhsh: Central
- Rural District: Razmavaran

Population (2006)
  - Total: 537
- Time zone: UTC+3:30 (IRST)
  - Summer (DST): UTC+4:30 (IRDT)

Dahanabad (Persian: دهن اباد, also Romanized as Dahanābād, Dahen Abad, and Dehnābād; also known as Rahnābād) is a village in Razmavaran Rural District, in the Central District of Rafsanjan County, Kerman Province, Iran. At the 2006 census, its population was 537, in 116 families.
