= Mohammadabad-e Seyyed Jalal =

Mohammadabad-e Seyyed Jalal محمدابادسيدجلال
- Village
- Location within Iran
- Coordinates: 30°50′46″N 55°41′40″E
- Country: Iran
- Province: Kerman
- County: Rafsanjan
- Bakhsh: Nuq
- Rural District: Bahreman

Population (2006)
  - Total: 32
- Time zone: UTC+3:30 (IRST)
  - Summer (DST): UTC+4:30 (IRDT)

Mohammadabad-e Seyyed Jalal (Persian: محمدابادسيدجلال, also Romanized as Moḩammadābād-e Seyyed Jalāl) is a village in Bahreman Rural District, Nuq District, Rafsanjan County, Kerman Province, Iran. At the 2006 census, its population was 32, in 8 families.
