= Moghuiyeh =

Moghuiyeh or Moghaviyeh or Maghuiyeh or Maghueeyeh (Persian: مغوئيه) may refer to:

- Maghuiyeh-ye Sofla, Baft County
- Moghaviyeh, Bam
- Moghuiyeh, Rafsanjan
- Moghuyeh, a village in Hormozgan province, Iran
- Moghuyeh Rural District, an administrative division of Bandar Lengeh County, Hormozgan province, Iran
