= Abbasabad-e Fallah =

Abbasabad-e Fallah عباس ابادفلاح
- Village
- Location within Iran
- Coordinates: 31°03′00″N 55°30′00″E
- Country: Iran
- Province: Kerman
- County: Rafsanjan
- Bakhsh: Nuq
- Rural District: Bahreman

Population (2006)
  - Total: 69
- Time zone: UTC+3:30 (IRST)
  - Summer (DST): UTC+4:30 (IRDT)

Abbasabad-e Fallah (Persian: عباس ابادفلاح, also Romanized as ‘Abbāsābād-e Fallāḩ; also known as ‘Abbāsābād) is a village in Bahreman Rural District, Nuq District, Rafsanjan County, Kerman Province, Iran. At the 2006 census, its population was 69, in 16 families.
