= Ahmadiyeh, Rafsanjan =

Ahmadiyeh احمديه
- Village
- Location within Iran
- Coordinates: 30°57′20″N 55°38′12″E
- Country: Iran
- Province: Kerman
- County: Rafsanjan
- Bakhsh: Nuq
- Rural District: Bahreman

Population (2006)
  - Total: 901
- Time zone: UTC+3:30 (IRST)
  - Summer (DST): UTC+4:30 (IRDT)

Ahmadiyeh (Persian: احمديه, also Romanized as Aḩmadīyeh; also known as Ahmadī) is a village in Bahreman Rural District, Nuq District, Rafsanjan County, Kerman Province, Iran. At the 2006 census, its population was 901, in 222 families.
