= Ahmadabad-e Fallah =

Ahmadabad-e Fallah احمدابادفلاح
- Village
- Location within Iran
- Coordinates: 31°01′53″N 55°32′47″E
- Country: Iran
- Province: Kerman
- County: Rafsanjan
- Bakhsh: Nuq
- Rural District: Bahreman

Population (2006)
  - Total: 169
- Time zone: UTC+3:30 (IRST)
  - Summer (DST): UTC+4:30 (IRDT)

Ahmadabad-e Fallah (Persian: احمدابادفلاح, also Romanized as Aḩmadābād-e Fallāḩ; also known as Aḩmadābād) is a village in Bahreman Rural District, Nuq District, Rafsanjan County, Kerman Province, Iran. At the 2006 census, its population was 169, in 36 families.
