= Zoharkuh =

Zoharkuh ظهركوه
- Village
- Location within Iran
- Coordinates: 30°31′59″N 56°26′21″E
- Country: Iran
- Province: Kerman
- County: Rafsanjan
- Bakhsh: Central
- Rural District: Khenaman

Population (2006)
  - Total: 13
- Time zone: UTC+3:30 (IRST)
  - Summer (DST): UTC+4:30 (IRDT)

Zoharkuh (Persian: ظهركوه, also Romanized as Ẕoharkūh; also known as Zārkūh) is a village in Khenaman Rural District, in the Central District of Rafsanjan County, Kerman Province, Iran. At the 2006 census, its population was 13, in 6 families.
