= Davazdah Emam, Kerman =

Davazdah Emam دوازده امام
- Village
- Location within Iran
- Coordinates: 30°27′22″N 56°27′51″E
- Country: Iran
- Province: Kerman
- County: Rafsanjan
- Bakhsh: Central
- Rural District: Khenaman

Population (2006)
  - Total: 132
- Time zone: UTC+3:30 (IRST)
  - Summer (DST): UTC+4:30 (IRDT)

Davazdah Emam (Persian: دوازده امام, also Romanized as Davāzdah Emām) is a village in Khenaman Rural District, in the Central District of Rafsanjan County, Kerman Province, Iran. At the 2006 census, its population was 132, in 39 families.
