= Rudin, Rafsanjan =

Rudin رودين
- Village
- Location within Iran
- Coordinates: 30°01′42″N 55°56′41″E
- Country: Iran
- Province: Kerman
- County: Rafsanjan
- Bakhsh: Central
- Rural District: Sarcheshmeh

Population (2006)
  - Total: 12
- Time zone: UTC+3:30 (IRST)
  - Summer (DST): UTC+4:30 (IRDT)

Rudin (Persian: رودين, also Romanized as Rūdīn) is a village in Sarcheshmeh Rural District, in the Central District of Rafsanjan County, Kerman Province, Iran. At the 2006 census, its population was 12, in 4 families.
