= Daquqabad =

Daquqabad دقوق اباد
- Village
- Location within Iran
- Coordinates: 30°57′39″N 55°37′15″E
- Country: Iran
- Province: Kerman
- County: Rafsanjan
- Bakhsh: Nuq
- Rural District: Bahreman

Population (2006)
  - Total: 833
- Time zone: UTC+3:30 (IRST)
  - Summer (DST): UTC+4:30 (IRDT)

Daquqabad (Persian: دقوق اباد, also Romanized as Daqūqābād; also known as Coghābād, Dūghābād, Dūjābād, and Dūqābād) is a village in Bahreman Rural District, Nuq District, Rafsanjan County, Kerman Province, Iran. At the 2006 census, its population was 833, in 223 families.
