= Akbarabad-e Barkhordar =

Akbarabad-e Barkhvordar اكبرابادبرخوردار
- Village
- Location within Iran
- Coordinates: 30°31′14″N 55°58′55″E
- Country: Iran
- Province: Kerman
- County: Rafsanjan
- Bakhsh: Central
- Rural District: Azadegan

Population (2006)
  - Total: 299
- Time zone: UTC+3:30 (IRST)
  - Summer (DST): UTC+4:30 (IRDT)

Akbarabad-e Barkhvordar (Persian: اكبرابادبرخوردار, also Romanized as Akbarābād-e Barkhvordār and Akbarābād-e Barkhowrdār; also known as Akbarābād-e Pā’īn) is a village in Azadegan Rural District, in the Central District of Rafsanjan County, Kerman Province, Iran. At the 2006 census, its population was 299, in 76 families.
