= Chamtar Khan =

Chamtar Khan (Persian: چمترخان) may refer to:

- Chamtar Khan-e Olya
- Chamtar Khan-e Sofla
