= Hormozabad, Kerman =

Village in Kerman province, Iran

Hormozabad Persian: هرمزاباد
- Village
- Location within Iran
- Coordinates: 30°26′00″N 55°51′17″E
- Country: Iran
- Province: Kerman
- County: Rafsanjan
- District: Central
- Rural District: Eslamiyeh

Population (2016)
  - Total: 2,665
- Time zone: UTC+3:30 (IRST)

Hormozabad (Persian: هرمزاباد) (Note: Also romanized as Hormozābād; also known as Hormoz and Hormuz) is a village in, and the capital of, Eslamiyeh Rural District of the Central District of Rafsanjan County, Kerman province, Iran.

== Demographics ==
=== Population ===
At the time of the 2006 National Census, the village's population was 2,302 in 543 households. The following census in 2011 counted 2,750 people in 745 households. The 2016 census measured the population of the village as 2,665 people in 784 households.
