= Eslamiyeh, Kerman =

Eslamiyeh اسلاميه
- Village
- Location within Iran
- Coordinates: 30°30′45″N 56°04′20″E
- Country: Iran
- Province: Kerman
- County: Rafsanjan
- Bakhsh: Central
- Rural District: Azadegan

Population (2006)
  - Total: 466
- Time zone: UTC+3:30 (IRST)
  - Summer (DST): UTC+4:30 (IRDT)

Eslamiyeh (Persian: اسلاميه, also Romanized as Eslāmīyeh; also known as Soleymānīyeh) is a village in Azadegan Rural District, in the Central District of Rafsanjan County, Kerman Province, Iran. At the 2006 census, its population was 466, in 115 families.
