= Akbarabad-e Hejri =

Akbarabad-e Hejri اكبراباد هجري
- Village
- Location within Iran
- Coordinates: 30°29′56″N 56°03′27″E
- Country: Iran
- Province: Kerman
- County: Rafsanjan
- Bakhsh: Central
- Rural District: Azadegan

Population (2006)
  - Total: 405
- Time zone: UTC+3:30 (IRST)
  - Summer (DST): UTC+4:30 (IRDT)

Akbarabad-e Hejri (Persian: اكبراباد هجري, also Romanized as Akbarābād-e Hejrī; also known as Akbarābād and Akbarābād-e Hūjī) is a village in Azadegan Rural District, in the Central District of Rafsanjan County, Kerman Province, Iran. At the 2006 census, its population was 405, in 103 families.
