= Dehuiyeh, Rafsanjan =

Village in Kerman province, Iran

Dehuiyeh Persian: دهوييه
- Village
- Location within Iran
- Coordinates: 30°11′52″N 55°58′27″E
- Country: Iran
- Province: Kerman
- County: Rafsanjan
- District: Central
- Rural District: Sarcheshmeh

Population (2016)
  - Total: 244
- Time zone: UTC+3:30 (IRST)

Dehuiyeh (Persian: دهوييه) (Note: Also romanized as Dehoo’yeh, Dehū’īyeh, Deh’ūyeh, and Dohū’īyeh) is a village in Sarcheshmeh Rural District of the Central District of Rafsanjan County, Kerman province, Iran.

== Demographics ==
=== Population ===
At the time of the 2006 National Census, the village's population was 48 in 12 households. The following census in 2011 counted 182 people in 59 households. The 2016 census measured the population of the village as 244 people in 66 households. It was the most populous village in its rural district.
