= Lahijan, Kerman =

Village in Kerman province, Iran

Lahijan Persian: لاهيجان
- Village
- Location within Iran
- Coordinates: 30°27′05″N 55°54′39″E
- Country: Iran
- Province: Kerman
- County: Rafsanjan
- District: Central
- Rural District: Razmavaran

Population (2016)
  - Total: 2,838
- Time zone: UTC+3:30 (IRST)

Lahijan (Persian: لاهيجان) (Note: Also romanized as Lāhījān; also known as Lāijan) is a village in, and the capital of, Razmavaran Rural District of the Central District of Rafsanjan County, Kerman province, Iran.

== Demographics ==
=== Population ===
At the time of the 2006 National Census, the village's population was 2,335 in 540 households. The following census in 2011 counted 2,598 people in 709 households. The 2016 census measured the population of the village as 2,838 people in 823 households. It was the most populous village in its rural district.
