= Rezaabad, Azadegan =

Village in Kerman province, Iran

Rezaabad Persian: رضااباد
- Village
- Location within Iran
- Coordinates: 30°29′58″N 55°58′45″E
- Country: Iran
- Province: Kerman
- County: Rafsanjan
- District: Central
- Rural District: Azadegan

Population (2016)
  - Total: 1,093
- Time zone: UTC+3:30 (IRST)

Rezaabad (Persian: رضااباد) (Note: Also romanized as Reẕāābād) is a village in, and the capital of, Azadegan Rural District of the Central District of Rafsanjan County, Kerman province, Iran.

== Demographics ==
=== Population ===
At the time of the 2006 National Census, the village's population was 1,217 in 297 households. The following census in 2011 counted 1,606 people in 436 households. The 2016 census measured the population of the village as 1,093 people in 338 households.
