= Najmabad, Kerman =

Najmabad نجم اباد
- Village
- Location within Iran
- Coordinates: 30°58′27″N 55°36′01″E
- Country: Iran
- Province: Kerman
- County: Rafsanjan
- Bakhsh: Nuq
- Rural District: Bahreman

Population (2006)
  - Total: 261
- Time zone: UTC+3:30 (IRST)
  - Summer (DST): UTC+4:30 (IRDT)

Najmabad (Persian: نجم اباد, also Romanized as Najmābād) is a village in Bahreman Rural District, Nuq District, Rafsanjan County, Kerman Province, Iran. At the 2006 census, its population was 261, in 69 families.
