= Eslamabad, Rafsanjan =

Village in Kerman province, Iran

Eslamabad Persian: اسلام اباد
- Village
- Location within Iran
- Coordinates: 30°24′47″N 55°56′44″E
- Country: Iran
- Province: Kerman
- County: Rafsanjan
- District: Central
- Rural District: Eslamiyeh

Population (2016)
  - Total: 5,662
- Time zone: UTC+3:30 (IRST)

Eslamabad (Persian: اسلام اباد) (Note: Also romanized as Eslāmābād) is a village in Eslamiyeh Rural District of the Central District of Rafsanjan County, Kerman province, Iran.

== Demographics ==
=== Population ===
At the time of the 2006 National Census, the village's population was 3,019 in 735 households. The following census in 2011 counted 4,712 people in 1,249 households. The 2016 census measured the population of the village as 5,662 people in 1,654 households. It was the most populous village in its rural district.
