= Kurgeh, Kerman =

Kurgeh كورگه
- Village
- Location within Iran
- Coordinates: 30°26′18″N 55°54′01″E
- Country: Iran
- Province: Kerman
- County: Rafsanjan
- Bakhsh: Central
- Rural District: Razmavaran

Population (2006)
  - Total: 623
- Time zone: UTC+3:30 (IRST)
  - Summer (DST): UTC+4:30 (IRDT)

Kurgeh (Persian: كورگه, also Romanized as Kūrgeh and Koorgeh; also known as Kargen and Kūrkeh) is a village in Razmavaran Rural District, in the Central District of Rafsanjan County, Kerman Province, Iran. At the 2006 census, its population was 623, in 157 families.
