= Reisabad, Eslamiyeh =

Reisabad رييس اباد
- Village
- Location within Iran
- Coordinates: 30°26′54″N 55°50′28″E
- Country: Iran
- Province: Kerman
- County: Rafsanjan
- Bakhsh: Central
- Rural District: Eslamiyeh

Population (2006)
  - Total: 10
- Time zone: UTC+3:30 (IRST)
  - Summer (DST): UTC+4:30 (IRDT)

Reisabad (Persian: رييس اباد, also Romanized as Re’īsābād; also known as Morteẕáābād (Persian: مرتضي اباد) and Rīsābād) is a village in Eslamiyeh Rural District, in the Central District of Rafsanjan County, Kerman Province, Iran. At the 2006 census, its population was 10, in 4 families.
