= Hasanabad-e Nushabad =

Hasanabad-e Nushabad حسن ابادنوش اباد
- Village
- Location within Iran
- Coordinates: 30°25′03″N 55°51′38″E
- Country: Iran
- Province: Kerman
- County: Rafsanjan
- Bakhsh: Central
- Rural District: Eslamiyeh

Population (2006)
  - Total: 1,080
- Time zone: UTC+3:30 (IRST)
  - Summer (DST): UTC+4:30 (IRDT)

Hasanabad-e Nushabad (Persian: حسن ابادنوش اباد, also Romanized as Ḩasanābād-e Nūshābād; also known as Nūshābād) is a village in Eslamiyeh Rural District, in the Central District of Rafsanjan County, Kerman Province, Iran. At the 2006 census, its population was 1,080, in 258 families.
