= Mortezaabad =

Mortezaabad (Persian: مرتضي اباد) may refer to:

- Mortezaabad, Kerman
- Mortezaabad, Khuzestan
- Mortezaabad, Qazvin

== See also ==
- Murtazaabad, Pakistan
