= Khenaman =

Village in Kerman province, Iran

Khenaman Persian: خنامان
- Village
- Location within Iran
- Coordinates: 30°26′59″N 56°27′33″E
- Country: Iran
- Province: Kerman
- County: Rafsanjan
- District: Central
- Rural District: Khenaman

Population (2016)
  - Total: 431
- Time zone: UTC+3:30 (IRST)

Khenaman (Persian: خنامان) (Note: Also romanized as Khanaman and Khenāmān; also known as Khināmān) is a village in, and the capital of, Khenaman Rural District of the Central District of Rafsanjan County, Kerman province, Iran.

== Demographics ==
=== Population ===
At the time of the 2006 National Census, the village's population was 441 in 118 households. The following census in 2011 counted 666 people in 189 households. The 2016 census measured the population of the village as 431 people in 144 households. It was the most populous village in its rural district.
