= Moghuiyeh, Rafsanjan =

Moghuiyeh مغوئيه
- Village
- Location within Iran
- Coordinates: 30°01′34″N 55°54′36″E
- Country: Iran
- Province: Kerman
- County: Rafsanjan
- Bakhsh: Central
- Rural District: Sarcheshmeh

Population (2006)
  - Total: 26
- Time zone: UTC+3:30 (IRST)
  - Summer (DST): UTC+4:30 (IRDT)

Moghuiyeh (Persian: مغوئيه, also Romanized as Moghū’īyeh and Maghū’īyeh; also known as Magū, Moghū, Moqū’īyeh, and Mūku) is a village in Sarcheshmeh Rural District, in the Central District of Rafsanjan County, Kerman Province, Iran. At the 2006 census, its population was 26, in 11 families.
