= Jafarabad, Rafsanjan =

Village in Kerman province, Iran

Jafarabad Persian: جعفراباد
- Village
- Location within Iran
- Coordinates: 30°27′29″N 56°00′48″E
- Country: Iran
- Province: Kerman
- County: Rafsanjan
- District: Central
- Rural District: Azadegan

Population (2016)
  - Total: 2,222
- Time zone: UTC+3:30 (IRST)

Jafarabad (Persian: جعفراباد) (Note: Also romanized as Ja‘farābād) is a village in Azadegan Rural District of the Central District of Rafsanjan County, Kerman province, Iran.

== Demographics ==
=== Population ===
At the time of the 2006 National Census, the village's population was 1,751 in 436 households. The following census in 2011 counted 1,807 people in 501 households. The 2016 census measured the population of the village as 2,222 people in 662 households. It was the most populous village in its rural district.
