= Kurgeh =

Kurgeh or Koorgeh (Persian: كورگه) may refer to:

- Kurgeh, Kerman
- Kurgeh, West Azerbaijan
