= Nazmabad, Rafsanjan =

Nazmabad نظم اباد
- Village
- Location within Iran
- Coordinates: 30°27′30″N 55°57′46″E
- Country: Iran
- Province: Kerman
- County: Rafsanjan
- Bakhsh: Central
- Rural District: Razmavaran

Population (2006)
  - Total: 51
- Time zone: UTC+3:30 (IRST)
  - Summer (DST): UTC+4:30 (IRDT)

Nazmabad (Persian: نظم اباد, also Romanized as Naz̧mābād; also known as Najmābād) is a village in Razmavaran Rural District, in the Central District of Rafsanjan County, Kerman Province, Iran. At the 2006 census, its population was 51, in 15 families.
