= Akbarabad-e Olya =

Akbarabad-e Olya can refer to the following village in Iran:

- Akbarabad-e Olya, Lorestan
- Akbarabad-e Olya, Markazi

== See also ==
- Akbarabad (disambiguation)
