= Rudin (disambiguation) =

Rudin is a Russian novel by Ivan Turgenev. It may also refer to:

== People ==
- Rudin (surname)

== Places ==
- Rudin, Koshkuiyeh, a village in Kerman Province, Iran
- Rudin, Rafsanjan, a village in Kerman Province, Iran
