= Nushabad (disambiguation) =

Nushabad is a city in Isfahan Province, Iran.

Nushabad (Persian: نوش آباد) may also refer to:

- Nushabad, Rafsanjan, Kerman Province
- Nushabad, Lorestan
- Nushabad, Sistan and Baluchestan
