= Razabad =

Razabad (Persian: رضاباد) may refer to:

- Rezaabad-e Sharqi
- Rezaabad, Khenaman
