= Marziyeh Amirizadeh =

Iranian-American prisoner and author

- Born: November 25, 1978 (age 47); Rafsanjan, Iran
- Education: Master of Science in International Affairs
- Alma mater: Georgia Institute of Technology
- Occupations: Author, international speaker, activist

Marziyeh Amirizadeh is an Iranian-American author whose imprisonment in Iran's Evin Prison attracted international attention and concern. In 2009, Amirizadeh and Maryam Rostampour were sentenced to execution by hanging for converting to Christianity in Iran. They were detained in the notorious Evin Prison for 259 days where they were tortured and interrogated.

After gaining freedom, Amirizadeh and Rostampour wrote Captive in Iran which detailed their experiences.

Amirizadeh became an American citizen in 2016 and campaigned in the 2022 Georgia House of Representatives election as a Republican. In 2022, she also completed her second book, A Love Journey with God, which details her difficult upbringing and journey to Christianity as well as further details of her imprisonment in Iran.

== Early life and conversion ==
Amirizadeh was born in the southern province of Kerman, Iran. In her early adulthood, she converted to Christianity, a decision that led her to engage in distributing Bibles, and whose conversion to Christianity was considered apostasy, a capital crime under Iranian Islamic law.

== Arrest and imprisonment ==
On March 5, 2009, Amirizadeh, along with her co-religionist Maryam Rostampour, was arrested in Iran on multiple charges including apostasy, blasphemy, anti-government activities, promoting Christianity, acting against state security, and participating in illegal gatherings. During her 259-day imprisonment, Amirizadeh faced solitary confinement, threats of torture, unsanitary living conditions, interrogations and discriminatory treatment due to her faith, and threats of execution by hanging.

Amirizadeh was released on November 18, 2009, following international pressure on the Iranian regime from entities such as the Holy See, the US State Department, and the United Nations.

== Emigration to the United States ==
After her release, Amirizadeh moved to Turkey, where she applied for asylum in the United States. In 2011, her asylum application was approved, and she moved to America. She became a US citizen in 2016 and gained a Master of Science in International Affairs from the Georgia Institute of Technology in Atlanta in 2019.

== Career and advocacy ==
Amirizadeh supports the restoration of relations between Iran and Israel, saying that both the Iranian and Israeli peoples share common concerns regarding the ruling Iranian regime.

Amirizadeh has written two books. Her first, Captive in Iran, was co-written with Maryam Rostampour, chronicles their experiences of imprisonment and persecution in Iran. Her second book, A Love Journey with God, published in 2022, talked about her upbringing, conversion to Christianity, and the challenges she faced both in Iran and during her journey to the United States.

== Political engagement ==
In 2022, Amirizadeh ran for election in the Georgia House of Representatives as a Republican, further extending her commitment to public service and advocacy for causes she believes in.

Amirizadeh is currently the president of New Persia, a non-profit organisation which describes itself as "advocat[ing] on behalf of persecuted Christians in Iran and other extremist Islamic societies", aiming to "empower many women who are suffering under Islam based on deep-seated misogyny".

== See also ==
- Freedom of religion in Iran
- List of Iranian women prisoners and detainees
