= Ebrahimabad-e Hajji =

Ebrahimabad-e Hajji ابراهيم ابادحاجي
- Village
- Location within Iran
- Coordinates: 30°26′55″N 56°00′10″E
- Country: Iran
- Province: Kerman
- County: Rafsanjan
- Bakhsh: Central
- Rural District: Azadegan

Population (2006)
  - Total: 359
- Time zone: UTC+3:30 (IRST)
  - Summer (DST): UTC+4:30 (IRDT)

Ebrahimabad-e Hajji (Persian: ابراهيم ابادحاجي, also Romanized as Ebrāhīmābād-e Ḩājjī; also known as Ebrāhīmābād, Qodratābād, and Qudratābād) is a village in Azadegan Rural District, in the Central District of Rafsanjan County, Kerman Province, Iran. At the 2006 census, its population was 359, in 90 families.
