= Davazdeh Emam =

Davazdeh Emam or Davazdah Emam (Persian: دوازده امام) may refer to:

- Davazdah Emam, Kerman
- Davazdah Emam, Kermanshah
- Davazdeh Emam, Tehran
