= Chah Darya =

Lake in Kerman, Iran

- Location within Iran
- Interactive map of Chah Darya
- Coordinates: 30°34′59″N 56°4′0″E
- Type: lake
- Primary inflows: rain
- Primary outflows: none
- Max. width: 20 metres (66 ft) 60 metres (200 ft)
- Average depth: 93 metres (305 ft)
- Settlements: Davaran, Iran

Chah Darya (Persian: چاه دریا) or Chah-i Darya is a natural well and underground lake in Iran. It is found below the desert coastline of Rafsanjan County of Kerman province. This site is 15 kilometers to the west of Davaran and close to the village of Odrej. Its width ranges from 20 to 60 meters, with a depth of 93 meters. Chah Darya is among only a small number of underground lakes in Iran. Formerly visible, it now lies retired.

== Folklore ==
Chah Darya lake is thought to be mysterious and creepy. Its deep waters have attracted explorers, some of whom were lost. Mysterious beings are said to inhabit the area.

A yarn recounts the experience of a camel herder who lost his camels and walking stick near Audarj village in Kerman. Days later he found his walking stick floating on the Zayandehrud River near Isfahan.

The space between the entrance and the lake offers speleologists and other visitors opportunities for exploration..

== Origins ==
The origin of Chah Darya remains undetermined. According to Mohammad Jahanshahi, the most likely explanation is that the land face collapsed. Located between Rafsanjan and Zarand, near Davaran village, Chah Darya is in an area prone to erosion. The entrance features two conical openings, measuring 60 and 30 measures wide and is girdled by yardangs.
