= Kabutar Khan, Kerman =

Village in Kerman province, Iran

Kabutar Khan Persian: كبوترخان
- Village
- Location within Iran
- Coordinates: 30°18′03″N 56°21′44″E
- Country: Iran
- Province: Kerman
- County: Rafsanjan
- District: Central
- Rural District: Kabutar Khan

Population (2016)
  - Total: 3,282
- Time zone: UTC+3:30 (IRST)

Kabutar Khan (Persian: كبوترخان) (Note: Also romanized as Kabūtar Khān) is a village in, and the capital of, Kabutar Khan Rural District of the Central District of Rafsanjan County, Kerman province, Iran.

== Demographics ==
=== Population ===
At the time of the 2006 National Census, the village's population was 2,735 in 715 households. The following census in 2011 counted 2,971 people in 850 households. The 2016 census measured the population of the village as 3,282 people in 941 households. It was the most populous village in its rural district.
