= Davaran, Rafsanjan =

Village in Kerman province, Iran

Davaran Persian: داوران
- Village
- Location within Iran
- Coordinates: 30°34′49″N 56°11′37″E
- Country: Iran
- Province: Kerman
- County: Rafsanjan
- District: Central
- Rural District: Darreh Doran

Population (2016)
  - Total: 2,631
- Time zone: UTC+3:30 (IRST)

Davaran (Persian: داوران) (Note: Also romanized as Dāvarān; also known as Dāviran) is a village in, and the capital of, Darreh Doran Rural District of the Central District of Rafsanjan County, Kerman province, Iran.

== Demographics ==
=== Population ===
At the time of the 2006 National Census, the village's population was 1,425 in 381 households. The following census in 2011 counted 1,189 people in 364 households. The 2016 census measured the population of the village as 2,631 people in 756 households. It was the most populous village in its rural district.
