= Javadiyeh ol Hiyeh =

City in Kerman province, Iran

Javadiyeh ol Hiyeh Persian: جواديه الهيه
- City
- Location within Iran
- Coordinates: 31°00′52″N 55°34′00″E
- Country: Iran
- Province: Kerman
- County: Rafsanjan
- District: Nuq

Population (2016)
  - Total: 4,132
- Time zone: UTC+3:30 (IRST)

Javadiyeh ol Hiyeh (Persian: جواديه الهيه) (Note: Also romanized as Javādīyeh ol Hīyeh; also known as Javādīyeh and Javādīyeh-ye Fallāḩ) is a city in Nuq District of Rafsanjan County, Kerman province, Iran.

== Demographics ==
=== Population ===
At the time of the 2006 National Census, Javadiyeh ol Hiyeh's population was 2,836 in 677 households, when it was a village in Bahreman Rural District. The following census in 2011 counted 3,810 people in 1,000 households. The 2016 census measured the population as 4,132 people in 1,121 households. It was the most populous village in its rural district.

In 2017, Javadiyeh ol Hiyeh was elevated to the status of a city.
