= Mes-e Sarcheshmeh =

City in Kerman province, Iran

Mes-e Sarcheshmeh Persian: مس سرچشمه
- City
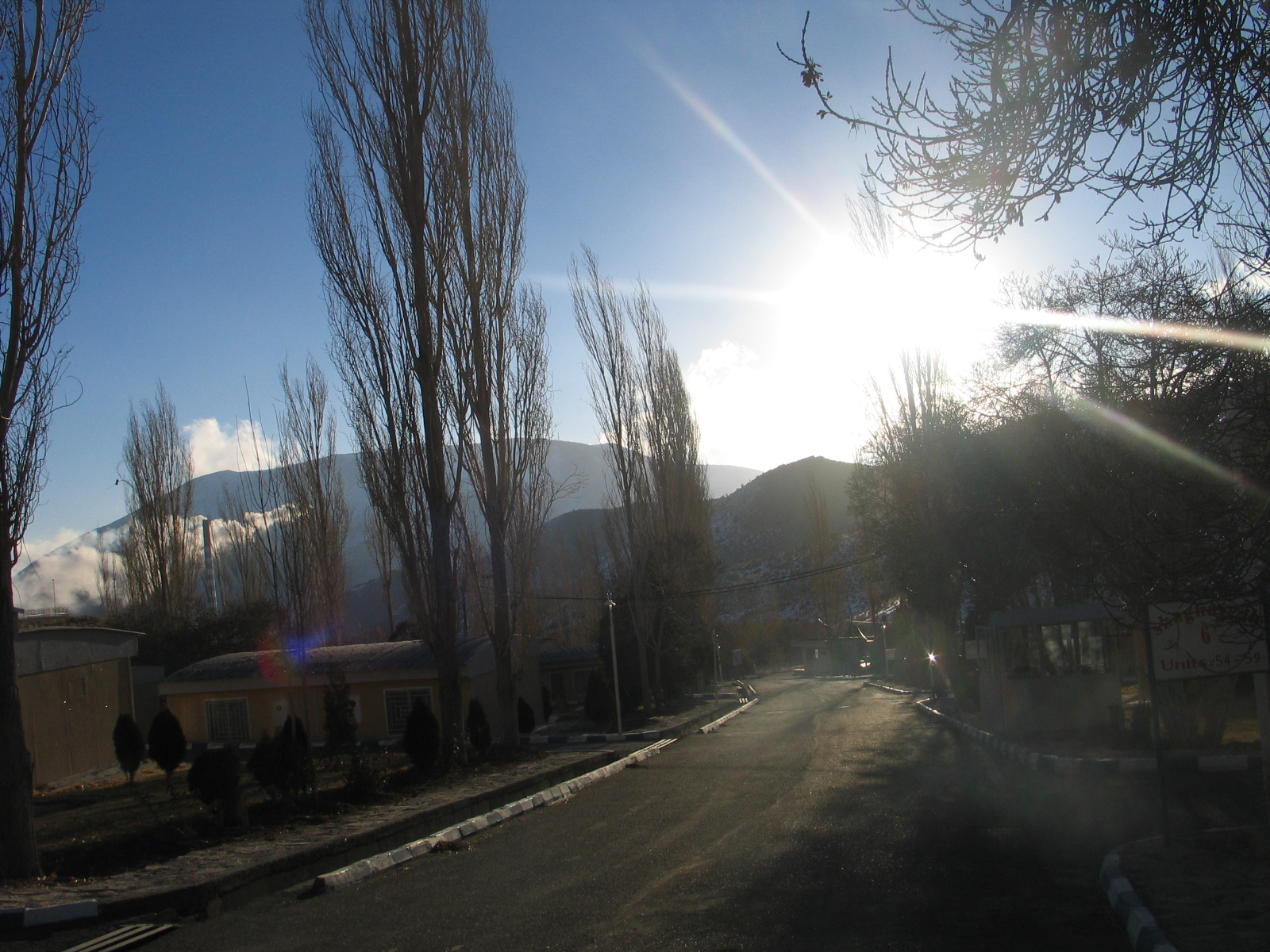
- Morning in Sarcheshmeh copper complex, Rafsanjan, Iran. The smeltery stacks emitting sulphur dioxide are clearly visible

- Location within Iran
- Coordinates: 29°59′57″N 55°47′39″E
- Country: Iran
- Province: Kerman
- County: Rafsanjan
- District: Central

Population (2016)
  - Total: 5,967
- Time zone: UTC+3:30 (IRST)

Mes-e Sarcheshmeh (Persian: مس سرچشمه) (Note: Also known as Sar Cheshmeh and Shahrak-e Mes-e Sar Cheshmeh (شهرک مس سرچشمه) (English: Sarcheshmeh Copper Town)) is a city in the Central District of Rafsanjan County, Kerman province, Iran, serving as the administrative center for Sarcheshmeh Rural District. The word mes means "copper" in Persian. The village was elevated to the status of a city in 1995. The city is so-named because it is the site of the second-largest copper mine in the world.

== Demographics ==
=== Population ===
At the time of the 2006 National Census, the city's population was 8,451 in 2,182 households. The following census in 2011 counted 6,406 people in 1,767 households. The 2016 census measured the population of the city as 5,967 people in 1,862 households.
