= Akbarabadi =

Akbarabadi is a surname, denoting those resident in or hailing from the city of Agra (known in the Mughal era as Akbarabad) in Uttar Pradesh, India. It may refer to:

- Akbarabadi Mahal, title of Izz-un-Nissa, wife of Mughal emperor Shah Jahan
- Bekas Akbarabadi, pen name of M. G. Gupta (1925–2011), Indian Urdu poet and research scholar
- Maikash Akbarabadi (1902–1991), Indian Urdu poet
- Nazeer Akbarabadi (1740–1830), Indian Urdu poet
- Seemab Akbarabadi (1882–1951), Pakistani Urdu poet
- Saeed Ahmad Akbarabadi (1908–1985), Indian Islamic scholar and writer

== See also ==
- Akbarabadi Mosque, mosque in Delhi built by Akbarabadi Mahal
