= Rafsanjan =

City in Kerman province, Iran

Rafsanjan رفسنجان
- City
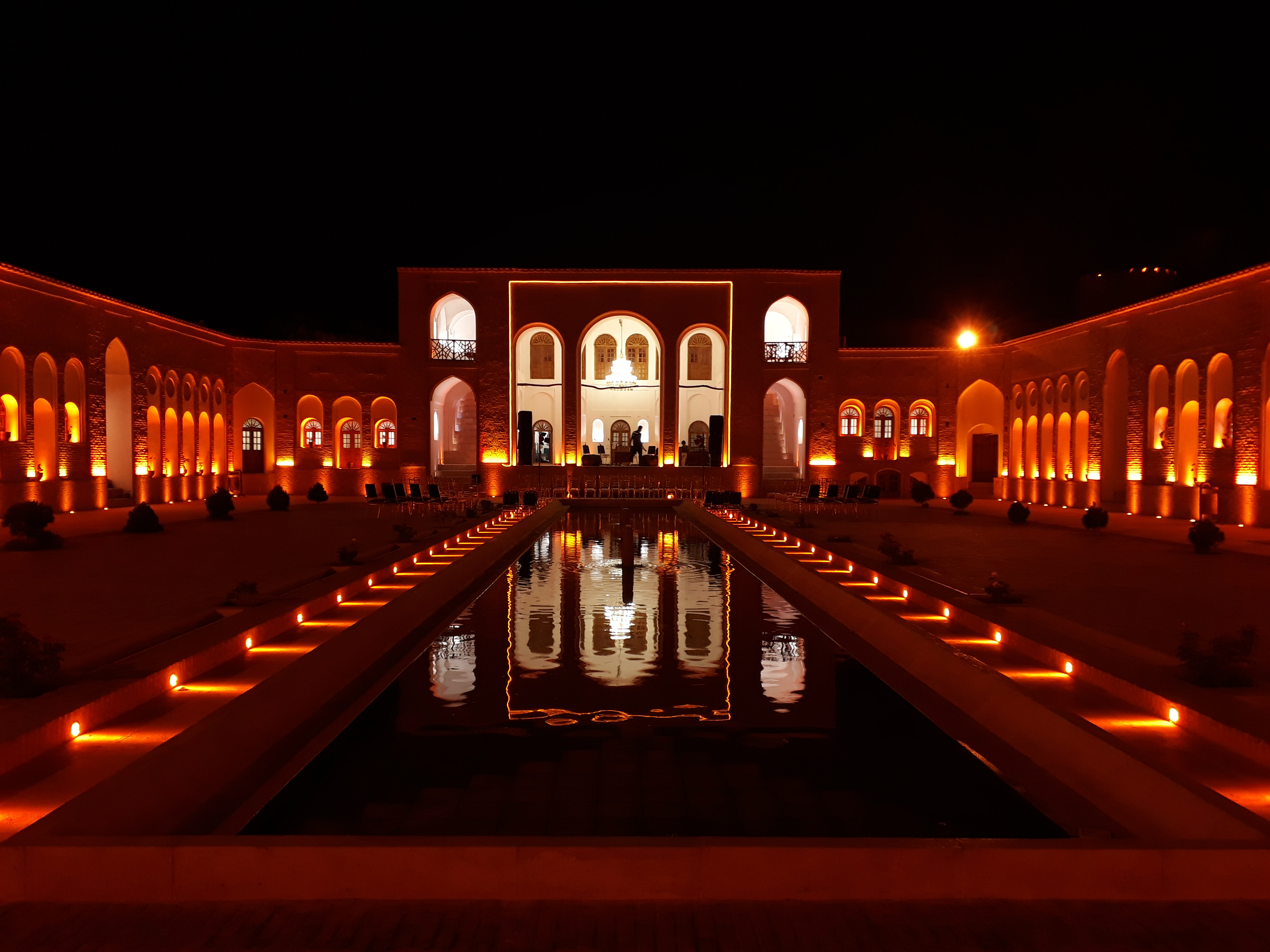
- Haj Agha Ali House in Rafsanjan

- Location within Iran
- Coordinates: 30°23′54″N 55°59′31″E
- Country: Iran
- Province: Kerman
- County: Rafsanjan
- District: Central

Population (2016)
  - Total: 161,909
- Time zone: UTC+3:30 (IRST)

Rafsanjan (Persian: رفسنجان [ɹæfsænˈd͡ʒɒːn]) (Note: Also romanized as Rafsanjān; also known as Bahrāmābād and Rafsinjān) is a city in the Central District of Rafsanjan County, Kerman province, Iran, serving as capital of both the county and the district.

== Demographics ==
=== Population ===
At the time of the 2006 National Census, the city's population was 136,388 in 33,489 households. The following census in 2011 counted 151,420 people in 39,281 households. The 2016 census measured the population of the city as 161,909 people in 47,013 households.

Rafsanjan is the biggest producer of pistachios in the world. The Sarcheshmeh copper mines are among the largest in the world. In addition, the biggest and oldest mud-house in the world is in Rafsanjan. The city is also a major center of carpet production, although the rugs are sold as Kermani rugs rather than Rafsanjani ones.

== Etymology ==
The origin of the name Rafsanjan is believed to have roots in Old Persian. According to one theory, the name is derived from the words "Rafsan" and "Kan," which in Old Persian mean "copper" and "mine," respectively. These two words gave rise to the original name of the city, "Rafsangan," which later transformed into its current Arabic version, "Rafsanjan."

Another theory suggests that the original name of the city was "Sanjan." Due to its location in the path of floods, the city suffered significant destruction and was renamed "Raft Sanjan" and then "Rafsanjan" among the people. It changed from “Raf” to “Raft”; adding a letter changes the meaning of the word in Farsi to “sweeping”, signifying the damage of the grand rapids. According to a legend, the city was renamed "Rafsanjan" after a massive rapid occurred in the area, resulting in the change from "Sanjan" to "Rafsanjan."

== History ==
About the origin and creation of this city there are significant rhetorical stories. At the period of Qajar kingdom and under Naser-Aldin-Shah's reign, Rafsanjan was named az “Anas” and was part of Fars province; after a while it came under the control of Kerman’s government. In the history, Rafsanjan has been named as an important city due to being on the crossroad between Kerman and Yazd. At the end of Safavieh kingdom, Afghans attacked this city and caused disaster and catastrophe. The low rate of prosperity after mentioned attack was stretched until Qajar’s kingdom and the city was almost ruined until that time. In 1787, Agha Mohammad Khan Qajar attacked the city and people decided to acquiesce in order to end the war, so he conquered the city without violence. In 1866, Ebrahim Khan Zahiradole (the governor of Kerman) ordered to reshape and rebuild the city. Buildings were constructed and the situation started to improve. In 1913, Amir Mofkhem Bakhtiari ordered to build a strong wall around the city which part of ruins still remain today. This step caused importance and accredit to the city. For the first time in 1938, crossroads were built in the city, which are named as Emam Khomeyni, Enghelab, and Shohada these days. Rafsanjan was also an important city due to high production of cotton earlier on time. Because of the high quality of this product, it was exported to India and Russia. In 1945, Rafsanjan was assigned as a township. Nowadays, Rafsanjan is considered as a of the most crowded cities of Kerman with major industries, oil depots, and agricultural mega-farms that have an undeniable role in the economy of province and country. Such mineral and agricultural products are well-known not only in Iran, but all around the world.

== Geography ==
Rafsanjan is located in south part of the Lut desert, in north-west of Kerman province. The longitude of this city is 56 degrees east and the latitude is 30 degrees south. The Average distance between Kerman and this city is 110 km (68 mi). The city has an airport and railway (Tehran-Bandar Abbas route). Moreover, the altitude is 1,460 m (4,790 ft) and the land-measurement is approximately 10,687 km (6,641 mi). North part of Rafsanjan has a common frontier with Bafgh and Zarand; south part is neighboring with Bardsir and on west side with Anar and Shahre-Babak; finally east side of this city is neighboring with Kerman and Zarand. Rafsanjan has two seasonal rivers named as Shour and Giouderi. The mountains in the area are part of Zagros range, and Sarcheshmeh and Davaran are the most famous.

The underground lake Chah Darya is located in Rafsanjan.

=== Climate ===
Rafsanjan has a hot desert climate (BWh) in the Köppen climate classification. The city has cold and chilly winters as well as very hot and dry summers. This city is located in the central part of Iran in the arid climate zone. Days are warm and nights are cold in general. The average amount of precipitation is 90 mm (3.5 in) annually.

Climate data for Rafsanjan (elevation: 1,580.9 m (5,187 ft), 1992-2005 normals)
Month	Jan	Feb	Mar	Apr	May	Jun	Jul	Aug	Sep	Oct	Nov	Dec	Year
Mean daily maximum °C (°F)	13.0 (55.4)	16.2 (61.2)	19.8 (67.6)	25.9 (78.6)	31.1 (88.0)	36.0 (96.8)	37.5 (99.5)	36.0 (96.8)	32.6 (90.7)	26.7 (80.1)	20.2 (68.4)	15.8 (60.4)	25.9 (78.6)
Daily mean °C (°F)	6.8 (44.2)	9.5 (49.1)	13.0 (55.4)	18.8 (65.8)	23.6 (74.5)	28.3 (82.9)	30.0 (86.0)	28.1 (82.6)	24.6 (76.3)	19.1 (66.4)	13.0 (55.4)	8.9 (48.0)	18.6 (65.6)
Mean daily minimum °C (°F)	0.6 (33.1)	2.8 (37.0)	6.3 (43.3)	11.8 (53.2)	16.1 (61.0)	20.6 (69.1)	22.4 (72.3)	20.2 (68.4)	16.7 (62.1)	11.4 (52.5)	5.7 (42.3)	2.0 (35.6)	11.4 (52.5)
Average precipitation mm (inches)	18.8 (0.74)	19.4 (0.76)	14.6 (0.57)	9.7 (0.38)	5.4 (0.21)	0.9 (0.04)	0.4 (0.02)	0.0 (0.0)	0.2 (0.01)	2.4 (0.09)	4.1 (0.16)	13.8 (0.54)	89.7 (3.52)
Average relative humidity (%)	49	40	36	30	24	19	19	18	19	25	36	43	30
Mean monthly sunshine hours	215.1	218.6	240.9	268.5	333.8	335.7	339.9	353.7	314.3	304.5	240.2	215.7	3,380.9
Source: Iran Meteorological Organization

=== Environment ===
Rafsanjan has been exposed to the polluting smoke of Sarcheshme, Khatunabad and Shahrbabak copper smelters. On the other hand, up to 14 pistachio orchards are sprayed every year, as a result, dozens of tons of poison are released in the pistachio orchards of Rafsanjan. The level of arsenic contamination in Rafsanjan water is about ten times the permissible limit, and it is strongly recommended to use authorized water purification devices for drinking water, and to ensure the health of the water purification device, the water produced by the device should also be tested.

=== Flora and fauna ===
Wild plantations and trees include common fig and almonds. Wild animals which are living in mountainous areas are wild goats, urials, gazelles, Indian wolves, striped hyenas, African wildcats and some species of birds like rock doves, eagles and partridges.

== Pistachio industry ==
Rafsanjan, a semiarid region in central Iran, is renowned for its high-quality pistachio production, generating nearly $1 billion annually. The Iranian government has provided energy and water subsidies over the past several decades, attracting producers to the area, where more than 30,000 people are directly involved in the production by owning or managing pistachio orchards. However, economically viable pistachio production requires specific climatic conditions, such as long, hot summers and sufficient chill in winters, which occur in areas far from surface water resources like rivers or lakes, making the crop water-intensive. As a result, pistachio producers in Rafsanjan have long relied on groundwater as the only source of water for irrigation.

According to reports from the late 1980s, the Rafsanjani family is said to "control" Iran's multimillion-dollar pistachio market centered around the town of Rafsanjan. Ali Akbar Hashemi Rafsanjani, former Iranian president and one of the most powerful members of the regime in Iran, was the head of the parliamentary speaker and had close ties to the Islamic Revolutionary Guard Corps (IRGC) construction firm, which built most of Iran's infrastructure, including dams. These dams were used to redirect water to the agricultural fields of high-ranking members of the regime, including the Rafsanjani family, resulting in a water mafia-like scenario.

=== Land rights ===
In the region, although communal “garden ownership” (baghcheh-dari) was prevalent among villagers, absentee landlords still held a virtual monopoly over the ownership of the basin's land and water resources. This is due to orchards being exempted from redistribution under the Iranian Land Reform Programme of 1962, which sought to abolish the feudal system and redistribute arable land from large landowners to smaller agricultural workers. At the end of the 80s, a survey done in two Rafsanjan villages revealed that villagers owned only about 17% of the water and cultivated land, while the rest belonged to a small number of absentee landlords.

==== Gender disparities ====
During the same era, there was a shift in labor relations from the traditional sharecropping contracts, which were prevalent throughout most of the Persian plateau, to wage labor. For pistachio cultivation, the new labor force was differentiated by skill and gender and was exclusively on a wage basis. The laborers, called “ghararis”, who were by definition male and highly skilled in irrigation work, which was an exclusively male task, constituted the "labor aristocracy." They were employed on a permanent basis with a monthly wage, a New Year bonus, and given a small plot of land free of charge with access to the landlord's irrigation water.

On the other hand, female laborers engaged in harvest and post-harvest operations occupied the lowest position in the labor hierarchy. Their work was seasonal, and their labor remuneration was mostly based on a piece-rate basis, with payment made three to four months after finishing the work. Additionally, the spinning and weaving of cotton textiles, which used to be a traditional income-earning activity for women, had at the time been virtually wiped out due to competition with the cheap synthetic fibers.

== Transport ==
Rafsanjan is located in the middle of Kerman-Yazd highway and also Chabahar transit pathway. The distances between Rafsanjan and the surrounding cities are: 12 km (7.5 mi) to Bardsir, 140 km (87 mi) to Sirjan, 130 km (81 mi) to Shahre-Babak, 90 km (56 mi) to Anar, 75 km (47 mi) to Zarand, 185 km (115 mi) to Bafgh and 230 km (140 mi) to Yazd.

Locally, people use both public and private transportation, however private vehicles are more popular among residents. Rafsanjan also houses bus stations with destination to almost every major city around the country, cargo and freit terminal, domestic trains station in the middle of Tehran-Bandar Abbas railway, and also a commercial airport with flights to and from Tehran.

== Notable people ==
- Mark Amin, vice president of Lions Gate Entertainment production company.
- Marziyeh Amirizadeh (born 1979), Iranian-American author imprisoned in Evin Prison and sentenced to execution by hanging for converting to Christianity; later tortured, and released after 259 days.
- Mohammad Hashemian, Shia cleric
- Mohammad Hosseini, former Minister of Culture and Islamic Guidance, was born in Koshkouyeh near Rafsanjan
- Hussayn Jalali, Shia cleric
- Seyyed Hossein Marashi, former Iranian Vice-President of Cultural Heritage and Tourism, was born in Koshkouyeh near Rafsanjan.
- Hashemi Rafsanjani, former President of Iran, was born in Nough, near Rafsanjan
- Ali Samereh, football player
- Mehdi Tabatabaei, Shia cleric

== Colleges and universities ==
- Islamic Azad University Rafsanjan Branch
- Allameh Jafari University
- Rafsanjan University of Medical Sciences
- Rafsanjan University of Vali Asr
- Rafsanjan School of Medicine

== Sport ==
Football club Mes Rafsanjan F.C. is based in the city.
