= Akbarabad-e Rah Niz =

Akbarabad-e Rah Niz اكبرابادراه نيز
- Village
- Location within Iran
- Coordinates: 29°16′31″N 56°05′54″E
- Country: Iran
- Province: Kerman
- County: Sirjan
- Bakhsh: Central
- Rural District: Balvard

Population (2006)
  - Total: 31
- Time zone: UTC+3:30 (IRST)
  - Summer (DST): UTC+4:30 (IRDT)

Akbarabad-e Rah Niz (Persian: اكبرابادراه نيز, also Romanized as Akbarābād-e Rāh Nīz; also known as Akbarābād) is a village in Balvard Rural District, in the Central District of Sirjan County, Kerman Province, Iran. At the 2006 census, its population was 31, in 7 families.
