= International affairs (disambiguation) =

International affairs may refer to:

- Diplomacy, the communication by representatives of states intended to influence events in the international system
- International relations, an academic discipline
- International Affairs (journal), an academic journal
- International Affairs (Soviet magazine), a communist propaganda vehicle
