= Kurgeh, West Azerbaijan =

Kurgeh كورگه
- Village
- Location within Iran
- Coordinates: 36°29′54″N 45°46′46″E
- Country: Iran
- Province: West Azerbaijan
- County: Mahabad
- Bakhsh: Khalifan
- Rural District: Kani Bazar

Population (2006)
  - Total: 54
- Time zone: UTC+3:30 (IRST)
  - Summer (DST): UTC+4:30 (IRDT)

Kurgeh (Persian: كورگه, also Romanized as Kūrgeh; also known as Kūrehgah) is a village in Kani Bazar Rural District, Khalifan District, Mahabad County, West Azerbaijan Province, Iran. At the 2006 census, its population was 54, in 9 families.
