= Moghaviyeh, Bam =

Moghaviyeh مغوئيه
- Village
- Location within Iran
- Coordinates: 28°57′34″N 58°06′43″E
- Country: Iran
- Province: Kerman
- County: Bam
- Bakhsh: Central
- Rural District: Howmeh

Population (2006)
  - Total: 54
- Time zone: UTC+3:30 (IRST)
  - Summer (DST): UTC+4:30 (IRDT)

Moghaviyeh (Persian: مغوئيه, also Romanized as Moghavīyeh; also known as Moqavīyeh) is a village in Howmeh Rural District, in the Central District of Bam County, Kerman Province, Iran. At the 2006 census, its population was 54, in 15 families.
