= Akbarabad, Bushehr =

Akbarabad اكبراباد
- Village
- Location within Iran
- Coordinates: 27°51′44″N 52°17′42″E
- Country: Iran
- Province: Bushehr
- County: Jam
- Bakhsh: Central
- Rural District: Jam

Population (2006)
  - Total: 81
- Time zone: UTC+3:30 (IRST)

Akbarabad (Persian: اكبراباد, also Romanized as Akbarābād) is a village in Jam Rural District, in the Central District of Jam County, Bushehr Province, Iran. At the 2006 census, its population was 81, in 13 families.
