= Akbarabad-e Khaleseh Tappeh Ginu =

Village in Kermanshah, Iran

Akbarabad-e Khaleseh Tappeh Ginu اكبرابادخالصه تپه گينو
- Village
- Location within Iran
- Coordinates: 34°34′29″N 46°57′51″E
- Country: Iran
- Province: Kermanshah
- County: Kermanshah
- Bakhsh: Central
- Rural District: Miyan Darband

Population (2006)
  - Total: 133
- Time zone: UTC+3:30 (IRST)
  - Summer (DST): UTC+4:30 (IRDT)

Akbarabad-e Khaleseh Tappeh Ginu (Persian: اكبرابادخالصه تپه گينو, also Romanized as Akbarābād-e Khāleṣeh Tappeh Gīnū; also known as Akbarābād) is a village in Miyan Darband Rural District, in the Central District of Kermanshah County, Kermanshah Province, Iran. At the 2006 census, its population was 133, in 27 families.
