= Akbarabad-e Arjomand =

Akbarabad-e Arjomand اكبرابادارجمند
- Village
- Location within Iran
- Coordinates: 28°53′43″N 58°48′37″E
- Country: Iran
- Province: Kerman
- County: Narmashir
- Bakhsh: Central
- Rural District: Azizabad

Population (2006)
  - Total: 54
- Time zone: UTC+3:30 (IRST)
  - Summer (DST): UTC+4:30 (IRDT)

Akbarabad-e Arjomand (Persian: اكبرابادارجمند, also Romanized as Akbarābād-e Ārjomand; also known as Akbarābād) is a village in Azizabad Rural District, in the Central District of Narmashir County, Kerman Province, Iran. At the 2006 census, its population was 54, in 11 families.
