= Dughabad, Jiroft =

Dughabad دوغ اباد
- Village
- Location within Iran
- Coordinates: 28°40′02″N 57°03′08″E
- Country: Iran
- Province: Kerman
- County: Jiroft
- Bakhsh: Central
- Rural District: Esfandaqeh

Population (2006)
  - Total: 38
- Time zone: UTC+3:30 (IRST)
  - Summer (DST): UTC+4:30 (IRDT)

Dughabad (Persian: دوغ اباد, also Romanized as Dūghābād) is a village in Esfandaqeh Rural District, in the Central District of Jiroft County, Kerman Province, Iran. At the 2006 census, its population was 38, in 7 families.
