= Dughabad, Rudbar-e Jonubi =

Dughabad دوغ اباد
- Village
- Location within Iran
- Coordinates: 28°01′33″N 58°32′24″E
- Country: Iran
- Province: Kerman
- County: Rudbar-e Jonubi
- Bakhsh: Jazmurian
- Rural District: Kuhestan

Population (2006)
  - Total: 89
- Time zone: UTC+3:30 (IRST)
  - Summer (DST): UTC+4:30 (IRDT)

Dughabad (Persian: دوغ اباد, also Romanized as Dūghābād) is a village in Kuhestan Rural District, Jazmurian District, Rudbar-e Jonubi County, Kerman Province, Iran. At the 2006 census, its population was 89, in 17 families.
