= Kabutar Khan Rural District =

Rural district in Kerman province, Iran

Kabutar Khan Rural District Persian: دهستان كبوترخان
- Rural District
- Location within Iran
- Coordinates: 30°18′30″N 56°17′56″E
- Country: Iran
- Province: Kerman
- County: Rafsanjan
- District: Central
- Capital: Kabutar Khan

Population (2016)
  - Total: 12,114
- Time zone: UTC+3:30 (IRST)

Kabutar Khan Rural District (Persian: دهستان كبوترخان) is in the Central District of Rafsanjan County, Kerman province, Iran. Its capital is the village of Kabutar Khan.

== Demographics ==
=== Population ===
At the time of the 2006 National Census, the rural district's population was 10,110 in 2,457 households. There were 10,545 inhabitants in 2,865 households at the following census of 2011. The 2016 census measured the population of the rural district as 12,114 in 3,510 households. The most populous of its 65 villages was Kabutar Khan, with 3,282 people.
