= Akbarabad-e Nivesht =

Akbarabad-e Nivesht اكبرابادنيوشت
- Village
- Location within Iran
- Coordinates: 35°06′21″N 50°07′41″E
- Country: Iran
- Province: Markazi
- County: Saveh
- Bakhsh: Central
- Rural District: Shahsavan Kandi

Population (2006)
  - Total: 54
- Time zone: UTC+3:30 (IRST)
  - Summer (DST): UTC+4:30 (IRDT)

Akbarabad-e Nivesht (Persian: اكبرابادنيوشت, also Romanized as Akbarābād-e Nīvesht; also known as Akbarābād) is a village in Shahsavan Kandi Rural District, in the Central District of Saveh County, Markazi Province, Iran. At the 2006 census, its population was 54, in 11 families.
