= Akbarabad, Pakistan =

Town in Punjab, Pakistan

Akbarabad اکبر آباد KOT SINGH
- Town
- Location of Akbarabad, Kasur, Punjab Akbarabad (Pakistan)
- Coordinates: 31°14′7″N 73°8′40″E
- Country: Pakistan
- Province: Punjab
- District: Kasur
- Tehsil: Kasur
- Number of Union Councils: 1

Area
  - Total: 0.44 sq mi (1.15 km^{2})

Population
  - Estimate (2017): 3,926
- Time zone: PST
  - Summer (DST): +05:00
- Calling code: 049

Akbarabad (Urdu: اکبر آباد), is a town and Union Council of Kasur District in the Punjab province of Pakistan.
