= Eslamiyeh, Kermanshah =

Eslamiyeh اسلاميه
- Village
- Location within Iran
- Coordinates: 34°58′36″N 47°34′29″E
- Country: Iran
- Province: Kermanshah
- County: Sonqor
- Bakhsh: Central
- Rural District: Gavrud

Population (2006)
  - Total: 225
- Time zone: UTC+3:30 (IRST)
  - Summer (DST): UTC+4:30 (IRDT)

Eslamiyeh (Persian: اسلاميه, also Romanized as Eslāmīyeh) is a village in Gavrud Rural District, in the Central District of Sonqor County, Kermanshah Province, Iran. At the 2006 census, its population was 225, in 54 families.
