= Bahreman =

City in Kerman province, Iran

Bahreman Persian: بهرمان
- City
- Location within Iran
- Coordinates: 30°54′13″N 55°43′49″E
- Country: Iran
- Province: Kerman
- County: Rafsanjan
- District: Nuq

Population (2016)
  - Total: 5,265
- Time zone: UTC+3:30 (IRST)

Bahraman City Entrance Sign

Bahreman (Persian: بهرمان) (Note: Also romanized as Bahremān; also known as Bāhermūn and Bahrmun) is a city in, and the capital of, Nuq District of Rafsanjan County, Kerman province, Iran. It also serves as the administrative center for Bahreman Rural District.

== History ==
The geographical points of Bahreman (بهرمان), Eslamiyeh (اسلامیه), Nematabad (نعمت ‌آباد), and Qasemabad (قاسم ‌آباد) were merged to form the village of Bahreman in 1997. The village rose to the status of a city in 2003.

== Demographics ==
=== Population ===
At the time of the 2006 National Census, the city's population was 4,405 in 1,109 households. The following census in 2011 counted 4,528 people in 1,270 households. The 2016 census measured the population of the city as 5,265 people in 1,474 households.

== Notable people ==
Former Iranian president Akbar Hashemi Rafsanjani was born in Bahreman.
