= Akbarabad, Kurdistan =

Akbarabad اكبر آباد
- Village
- Location within Iran
- Coordinates: 35°35′59″N 47°06′19″E
- Country: Iran
- Province: Kurdistan
- County: Divandarreh
- Bakhsh: Saral
- Rural District: Hoseynabad-e Shomali

Population (2006)
  - Total: 276
- Time zone: UTC+3:30 (IRST)
  - Summer (DST): UTC+4:30 (IRDT)

Akbarabad (Persian: اكبر آباد, also Romanized as Akbarābād) is a village in Hoseynabad-e Shomali Rural District, Saral District, Divandarreh County, Kurdistan Province, Iran. At the 2006 census, its population was 276, in 53 families. The village is populated by Kurds.
