= Robat-e Toroq =

Robat-e Toroq رباط طرق
- Village
- Location within Iran
- Coordinates: 36°11′37″N 59°37′22″E
- Country: Iran
- Province: Razavi Khorasan
- County: Mashhad
- Bakhsh: Ahmadabad
- Rural District: Sarjam

Population (2006)
  - Total: 965
- Time zone: UTC+3:30 (IRST)
  - Summer (DST): UTC+4:30 (IRDT)

Robat-e Toroq (Persian: رباط طرق, also Romanized as Robāţ-e Ţoroq; also known as Ribāt-i-Turuq and Akbarābād-e Ţoroq) is a village in Sarjam Rural District, Ahmadabad District, Mashhad County, Razavi Khorasan Province, Iran. At the 2006 census, its population was 965, in 252 families.
