= Akbarabad-e Sardasht =

Akbarabad-e Sardasht اكبرابادسردشت
- Village
- Location within Iran
- Coordinates: 28°59′41″N 53°38′11″E
- Country: Iran
- Province: Fars
- County: Fasa
- Bakhsh: Central
- Rural District: Kushk-e Qazi

Population (2006)
  - Total: 227
- Time zone: UTC+3:30 (IRST)
  - Summer (DST): UTC+4:30 (IRDT)

Akbarabad-e Sardasht (Persian: اكبرابادسردشت, also Romanized as Akbarābād-e Sardasht) is a village in Kushk-e Qazi Rural District, in the Central District of Fasa County, Fars province, Iran.According to the 2006 census, the village had a population of 227, in 57 families.
