= M. G. Gupta =

- Born: 29 August 1925; Kairana, Uttar Pradesh, India
- Died: 11 December 2011 (aged 86); Agra, Uttar Pradesh, India
- Writing career
- Pen name: Bekas Akbarabadi
- Notable works: Sarmad the Saint: Life and Works (1991)
- Notable awards: Bharat Jyoti Award

M. G. Gupta, known as Bekas Akbarabadi (1925-2011), was an Indian Urdu poet and research scholar. He wrote several books including Indian mysticism, Sikh Gurus, Saint Kabir, Hindu epics and others. He received the Bharat Jyoti Award for his contribution in the field of education and research.

== Early life ==
Gupta was born on 29 August 1925 in Kairana, United Provinces of Agra and Oudh, in British India (now the state of Uttar Pradesh in India). He pursued his Masters of Arts in Political Science. He served as a professor at the Allahabad University where he taught for twenty years, he was a scholar of Persian literature, comparative religion and mysticism. He was awarded the degree of Doctor of Letters by the Allahabad University in 1965. He also served as a registrar of Agra University. He died on 12 December 2011 in Agra.

== Works ==
In 1985 he wrote a book called Bekas Akbarabadi. In 1992 he wrote a book called Indian mysticism. He also wrote books on the Sikh Gurus, Saint Kabir and on the Hindu epics, the Ramayana and the Mahabharata. In July 1993, he was awarded the Bharat Jyoti Award for his 'contribution in the field of education and research'. A collection of his poems entitled, Rahat-i-Ruh was published in 2004.

== Sarmad the Saint ==
Gupta wrote and published his celebrated work Sarmad the Saint: Life and Works in 1991. According to A. G. Noorani, Indian Express, 21 June 1992 (New Delhi) "… the first definitive study of Sarmad's life, and an English translation of original Persian text of all the 341 quatrains by Dr. MG Gupta. He has also translated the legendary Rumi's classic work, the Mathnawi. Dr. Gupta's scholarship is evident … (He) traces Sarmad's life with a wealth of authentic references …"
