= Kabootar Khana =

Landmark in Mumbai, India

Kabootar Khana, Dadar
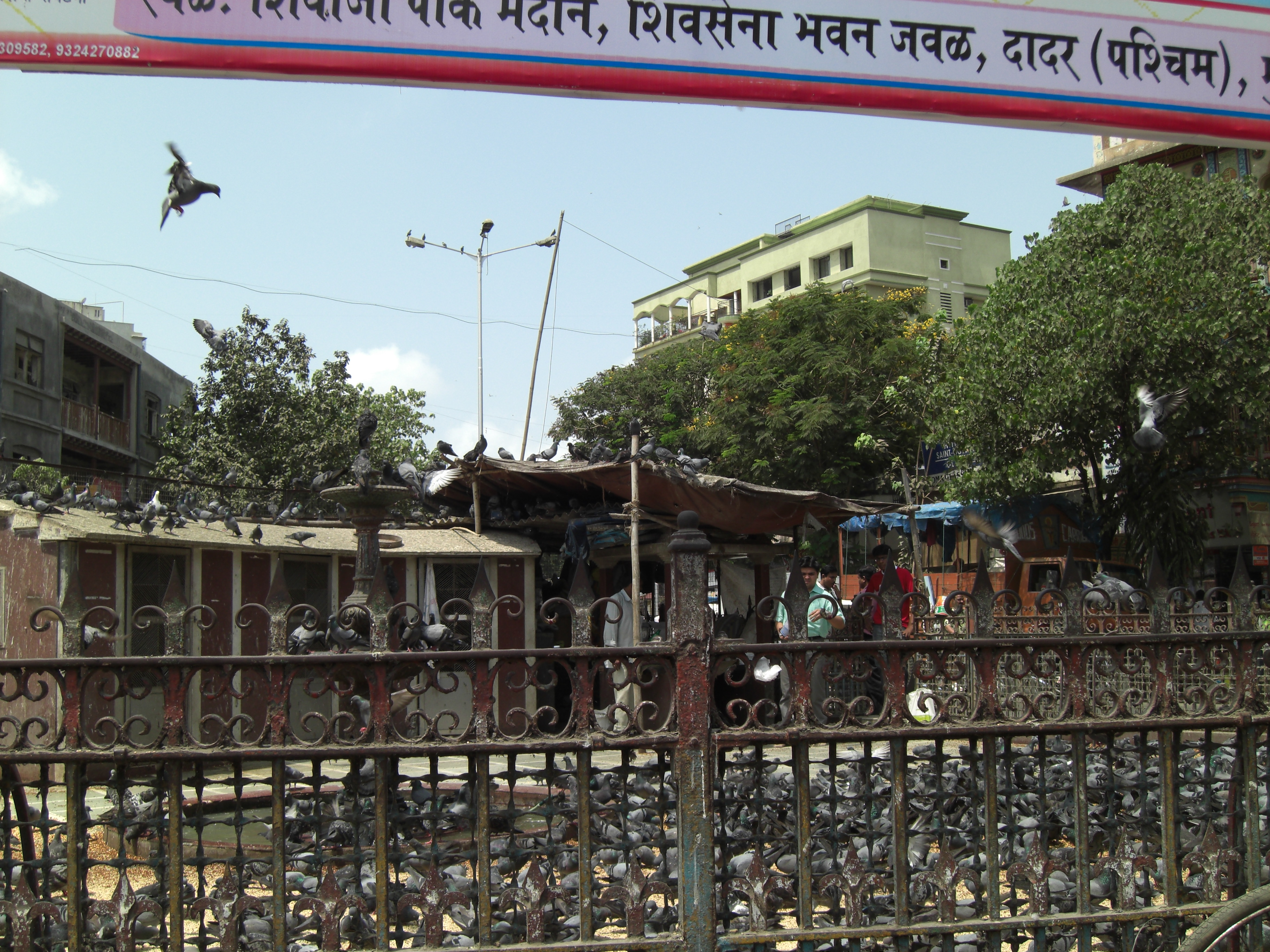
- Kabootar Khana, Dadar
- Interactive map of Kabootar Khana, Dadar
- Location: Dadar, Mumbai

Kabooter Khana is a landmark in Dadar, Mumbai.
