= Akbarabad-e Bahari =

Akbarabad-e Bahari اكبراباد بحري
- Village
- Location within Iran
- Coordinates: 30°25′13″N 57°51′24″E
- Country: Iran
- Province: Kerman
- County: Kerman
- Bakhsh: Shahdad
- Rural District: Takab

Population (2006)
  - Total: 118
- Time zone: UTC+3:30 (IRST)
  - Summer (DST): UTC+4:30 (IRDT)

Akbarabad-e Bahari (Persian: اكبراباد بحري, also Romanized as Akbarābād-e Baḥarī; also known as Akbarābād) is a village in Takab Rural District, Shahdad District, Kerman County, Kerman Province, Iran. At the 2006 census, its population was 118, in 34 families.
