= Akbarabad, Khonj =

Akbarabad اكبراباد اين جا اكبرآباد است @akbarabad.new
- Village
- Location within Iran
- Coordinates: 27°51′54″N 53°39′33″E
- Country: Iran
- Province: Fars
- County: Khonj
- Bakhsh: Central
- Rural District: Tang-e Narak

Population (2006)
  - Total: 90
- Time zone: UTC+3:30 (IRST)
  - Summer (DST): UTC+4:30 (IRDT)

Akbarabad (Persian: اكبراباد, also Romanized as Akbarābād) is a village in Tang-e Narak Rural District, in the Central District of Khonj County, Fars province, Iran. At the 2006 census, its population was 90, in 18 families.

Akbarabad,khonj

Akbarabad,khonj
