= Akbarabad, Khomeyn =

Village in Markazi, Iran

Akbarabad اكبراباد
- Village
- Location within Iran
- Coordinates: 33°39′16″N 50°05′35″E
- Country: Iran
- Province: Markazi
- County: Khomeyn
- Bakhsh: Central
- Rural District: Salehan

Population (2006)
  - Total: 33
- Time zone: UTC+3:30 (IRST)
  - Summer (DST): UTC+4:30 (IRDT)

Akbarabad (Persian: اكبراباد, also Romanized as Akbarābād) is a village in Salehan Rural District, in the Central District of Khomeyn County, Markazi Province, Iran. At the 2006 census, its population was 33, in 11 families.
