= Akbarabad, Rudsar =

Akbarabad اكبرآباد
- Village
- Location within Iran
- Coordinates: 36°47′23″N 50°11′07″E
- Country: Iran
- Province: Gilan
- County: Rudsar
- Bakhsh: Rahimabad
- Rural District: Shuil

Population (2016)
  - Total: 46
- Time zone: UTC+3:30 (IRST)

Akbarabad (Persian: اكبرآباد, also Romanized as Akbarābād) is a village in Shuil Rural District, Rahimabad District, Rudsar County, Gilan Province, Iran.

At the time of the 2006 National Census, the village's population was 108 in 31 households. The following census in 2011 counted 57 people in 22 households. The 2016 census measured the population of the village as 46 people in 24 households.
