= Akbarabad, Irandegan =

Akbarabad اكبراباد
- Village
- Interactive map of Akbarabad
- Coordinates: 28.300°N 61.162°E
- Country: Iran
- Province: Sistan and Baluchestan
- County: Khash
- Bakhsh: Irandegan
- Rural District: Kahnuk

Population (2006)
  - Total: 28
- Time zone: UTC+3:30 (IRST)
  - Summer (DST): UTC+4:30 (IRDT)

Akbarabad (Persian: اكبراباد, also Romanized as Akbarābād) is a village in Kahnuk Rural District, Irandegan District, Khash County, Sistan and Baluchestan province, Iran. At the 2006 census, its population was 28, in 6 families.
