= Akbarabad, Tuyserkan =

Akbarabad اكبراباد
- Village
- Location within Iran
- Coordinates: 34°27′41″N 48°15′12″E
- Country: Iran
- Province: Hamadan
- County: Tuyserkan
- Bakhsh: Qolqol Rud
- Rural District: Qolqol Rud

Population (2006)
  - Total: 111
- Time zone: UTC+3:30 (IRST)
  - Summer (DST): UTC+4:30 (IRDT)

Akbarabad (Persian: اكبراباد, also Romanized as Akbarābād) is a village in Qolqol Rud Rural District, Qolqol Rud District, Tuyserkan County, Hamadan Province, Iran. At the 2006 census, its population was 111, in 25 families.
