= Mortezaabad, Khuzestan =

Mortezaabad مرتضي اباد
- Village
- Country: Iran
- Province: Khuzestan
- County: Andika
- Bakhsh: Abezhdan
- Rural District: Kushk

Population (2006)
  - Total: 73
- Time zone: UTC+3:30 (IRST)
  - Summer (DST): UTC+4:30 (IRDT)

Mortezaabad (Persian: مرتضي اباد, also Romanized as Morteẕáābād) is a village in Kushk Rural District, Abezhdan District, Andika County, Khuzestan Province, Iran. At the 2006 census, its population was 73, in 11 families.
