= Akbarabad-e Qushchi =

Akbarabad-e Qushchi اكبرابادقوشچي
- Village
- Location within Iran
- Coordinates: 35°05′31″N 49°52′56″E
- Country: Iran
- Province: Markazi
- County: Saveh
- Bakhsh: Nowbaran
- Rural District: Aq Kahriz

Population (2006)
  - Total: 52
- Time zone: UTC+3:30 (IRST)
  - Summer (DST): UTC+4:30 (IRDT)

Akbarabad-e Qushchi (Persian: اكبرابادقوشچي, also Romanized as Akbarābād-e Qūshchī; also known as Akbarābād) is a village in Aq Kahriz Rural District, Nowbaran District, Saveh County, Markazi Province, Iran. At the 2006 census, its population was 52, in 11 families.
