= Maghuiyeh-ye Sofla =

Maghuiyeh-ye Sofla مغوئيه سفلي
- Village
- Location within Iran
- Coordinates: 29°22′10″N 56°38′41″E
- Country: Iran
- Province: Kerman
- County: Baft
- Bakhsh: Central
- Rural District: Kiskan

Population (2006)
  - Total: 239
- Time zone: UTC+3:30 (IRST)
  - Summer (DST): UTC+4:30 (IRDT)

Maghuiyeh-ye Sofla (Persian: مغوئيه سفلي, also Romanized as Maghū’īyeh-ye Soflá; also known as Moghūeeyeh-ye Soflá) is a village in Kiskan Rural District, in the Central District of Baft County, Kerman Province, Iran. At the 2006 census, its population was 239, in 56 families.
