= Akbarabad-e Now Deh =

Akbarabad-e Now Deh اكبرابادنوده
- Village
- Location within Iran
- Coordinates: 34°54′39″N 59°39′45″E
- Country: Iran
- Province: Razavi Khorasan
- County: Roshtkhar
- Bakhsh: Central
- Rural District: Rashtkhvar

Population (2006)
  - Total: 580
- Time zone: UTC+3:30 (IRST)
  - Summer (DST): UTC+4:30 (IRDT)

Akbarabad-e Now Deh (Persian: اكبرابادنوده, also Romanized as Akbarābād-e Now Deh; also known as Akbarābād) is a village in Roshtkhar Rural District, in the Central District of Roshtkhar County, Razavi Khorasan Province, Iran. At the 2006 census, its population was 580, in 141 families.

== See also ==
- List of cities, towns and villages in Razavi Khorasan Province
