= Akbarabad, Kerman =

Akbarabad اكبراباد
- Village
- Location within Iran
- Coordinates: 30°24′59″N 56°41′15″E
- Country: Iran
- Province: Kerman
- County: Kerman
- Bakhsh: Central
- Rural District: Ekhtiarabad

Population (2006)
  - Total: 51
- Time zone: UTC+3:30 (IRST)

Akbarabad (Persian: اكبراباد, also Romanized as Akbarābād; also known as Deh Bāqel and Deh Bāqer) is a village in Ekhtiarabad Rural District, in the Central District of Kerman County, Kerman Province, Iran. At the 2006 census, its population was 51, in 13 families.
