= Akbarabad-e Mostowfi =

Akbarabad-e Mostowfi اكبرابادمستوفي
- Village
- Location within Iran
- Coordinates: 28°51′53″N 58°53′37″E
- Country: Iran
- Province: Kerman
- County: Fahraj
- Bakhsh: Central
- Rural District: Borj-e Akram

Population (2006)
  - Total: 299
- Time zone: UTC+3:30 (IRST)
  - Summer (DST): UTC+4:30 (IRDT)

Akbarabad-e Mostowfi (Persian: اكبرابادمستوفي, also Romanized as Akbarābād-e Mostowfī; also known as Akbarābād) is a village in Borj-e Akram Rural District, in the Central District of Fahraj County, Kerman Province, Iran. At the 2006 census, its population was 299, in 69 families.
