= Akbarabad-e Now Kan =

Akbarabad-e Now Kan اكبر اباد نوكن
- Village
- Location within Iran
- Coordinates: 29°05′15″N 55°45′00″E
- Country: Iran
- Province: Kerman
- County: Sirjan
- Bakhsh: Central
- Rural District: Golestan

Population (2006)
  - Total: 19
- Time zone: UTC+3:30 (IRST)
  - Summer (DST): UTC+4:30 (IRDT)

Akbarabad-e Now Kan (Persian: اكبر اباد نوكن, also Romanized as Akbarābād-e Now Kan; also known as Akbarābād and Akbarābād-e Chāh Qal‘eh) is a village in Golestan Rural District, in the Central District of Sirjan County, Kerman Province, Iran. At the 2006 census, its population was 19, in 5 families.
