= Najmabad, Shiraz =

Najmabad نجم اباد
- Village
- Location within Iran
- Coordinates: 29°36′15″N 52°22′16″E
- Country: Iran
- Province: Fars
- County: Shiraz
- Bakhsh: Central
- Rural District: Qarah Bagh

Population (2006)
  - Total: 230
- Time zone: UTC+3:30 (IRST)
  - Summer (DST): UTC+4:30 (IRDT)

Najmabad (Persian: نجم اباد, also Romanized as Najmābād) is a village in Qarah Bagh Rural District, in the Central District of Shiraz County, Fars province, Iran. At the 2006 census, its population was 230, in 46 families.
