= Najmabad, Qir and Karzin =

Najmabad نجم اباد
- Village
- Location within Iran
- Coordinates: 28°25′48″N 52°38′01″E
- Country: Iran
- Province: Fars
- County: Qir and Karzin
- Bakhsh: Central
- Rural District: Hangam

Population (2006)
  - Total: 18
- Time zone: UTC+3:30 (IRST)
  - Summer (DST): UTC+4:30 (IRDT)

Najmabad (Persian: نجم اباد, also Romanized as Najmābād) is a village in Hangam Rural District, in the Central District of Qir and Karzin County, Fars province, Iran. At the 2006 census, its population was 18, in 7 families.
