= Akbarabad-e Yek =

Akbarabad-e Yek اكبر آباد1
- Village
- Location within Iran
- Coordinates: 30°56′28″N 55°56′43″E
- Country: Iran
- Province: Kerman
- County: Zarand
- Bakhsh: Yazdanabad
- Rural District: Siriz

Population (2006)
  - Total: 16
- Time zone: UTC+3:30 (IRST)
  - Summer (DST): UTC+4:30 (IRDT)

Akbarabad-e Yek (Persian: اكبر آباد1, also Romanized as Akbarābād-e Yek; also known as Akbarābād) is a village in Siriz Rural District, Yazdanabad District, Zarand County, Kerman Province, Iran. At the 2006 census, its population was 16, in 6 families.
