= Akbarabad-e Hashivar =

Akbarabad-e Hoshivar اكبرابادهشيوار
- Village
- Location within Iran
- Coordinates: 28°43′52″N 54°31′44″E
- Country: Iran
- Province: Fars
- County: Darab
- Bakhsh: Central
- Rural District: Hoshivar

Population (2006)
  - Total: 383
- Time zone: UTC+3:30 (IRST)
  - Summer (DST): UTC+4:30 (IRDT)

Akbarabad-e Hoshivar (Persian: اكبرابادهشيوار, also Romanized as Akbarābād-e Hoshīvār; also known as Akbarābād and Akbarābād-e Bālā) is a village in Hoshivar Rural District, in the Central District of Darab County, Fars province, Iran. At the 2006 census, its population was 383, in 86 families.
