= Najamabad, Pasargad =

Najamabad نجم اباد
- Village
- Location within Iran
- Coordinates: 30°00′55″N 53°20′30″E
- Country: Iran
- Province: Fars
- County: Pasargad
- Bakhsh: Central
- Rural District: Sarpaniran

Population (2006)
  - Total: 51
- Time zone: UTC+3:30 (IRST)
  - Summer (DST): UTC+4:30 (IRDT)

Najamabad (Persian: نجم اباد, also Romanized as Najamābād; also known as Najmekān) is a village in Sarpaniran Rural District, in the Central District of Pasargad County, Fars province, Iran. At the 2006 census, its population was 51, in 13 families.
