= Akbarabad-e Vaziri =

Akbarabad-e Vaziri اكبرابادوزيري
- Village
- Location within Iran
- Coordinates: 28°13′20″N 57°29′29″E
- Country: Iran
- Province: Kerman
- County: Anbarabad
- Bakhsh: Esmaili
- Rural District: Esmaili

Population (2006)
  - Total: 470
- Time zone: UTC+3:30 (IRST)
  - Summer (DST): UTC+4:30 (IRDT)

Akbarabad-e Vaziri (Persian: اكبرابادوزيري, also Romanized as Akbarābād-e Vazīrī; also known as Akbarābād) is a village in Esmaili Rural District, Esmaili District, Anbarabad County, Kerman Province, Iran. At the 2006 census, its population was 470, in 109 families.
