= Akbarabad, Khorramabad =

Akbarabad اكبراباد
- Village
- Location within Iran
- Coordinates: 33°28′26″N 48°37′51″E
- Country: Iran
- Province: Lorestan
- County: Khorramabad
- Bakhsh: Central
- Rural District: Azna

Population (2006)
  - Total: 93
- Time zone: UTC+3:30 (IRST)
  - Summer (DST): UTC+4:30 (IRDT)

Akbarabad (Persian: اكبراباد, also Romanized as Akbarābād; also known as Akbarābād-e ‘Olyā) is a village in Azna Rural District, in the Central District of Khorramabad County, Lorestan Province, Iran. At the 2006 census, its population was 93, in 19 families.
