= Qodratabad, Narmashir =

Qodratabad قدرت اباد
- Village
- Location within Iran
- Coordinates: 28°54′09″N 58°46′29″E
- Country: Iran
- Province: Kerman
- County: Narmashir
- Bakhsh: Central
- Rural District: Azizabad

Population (2006)
  - Total: 603
- Time zone: UTC+3:30 (IRST)
  - Summer (DST): UTC+4:30 (IRDT)

Qodratabad (Persian: قدرت اباد, also Romanized as Qodratābād; also known as Qodratābād-e Salār Mīzārī) is a village in Azizabad Rural District, in the Central District of Narmashir County, Kerman Province, Iran. At the 2006 census, its population was 603, in 117 families.
