= Akbarabad, Saveh =

Akbarabad اكبراباد
- Village
- Location within Iran
- Coordinates: 34°52′19″N 50°26′28″E
- Country: Iran
- Province: Markazi
- County: Saveh
- Bakhsh: Central
- Rural District: Qareh Chay

Population (2006)
  - Total: 307
- Time zone: UTC+3:30 (IRST)
  - Summer (DST): UTC+4:30 (IRDT)

Akbarabad (Persian: اكبراباد, also Romanized as Akbarābād; also known as Akbarābād-e ‘Olyā) is a village in Qareh Chay Rural District, in the Central District of Saveh County, Markazi Province, Iran. At the 2006 census, its population was 307, in 70 families.
