= Qodratabad, Fahraj =

Qodratabad قدرت اباد
- Village
- Location within Iran
- Coordinates: 28°51′45″N 59°14′11″E
- Country: Iran
- Province: Kerman
- County: Fahraj
- Bakhsh: Negin Kavir
- Rural District: Chahdegal

Population (2006)
  - Total: 162
- Time zone: UTC+3:30 (IRST)
  - Summer (DST): UTC+4:30 (IRDT)

Qodratabad (Persian: قدرت اباد, also Romanized as Qodratābād) is a village in Chahdegal Rural District, Negin Kavir District, Fahraj County, Kerman Province, Iran. At the 2006 census, its population was 162, in 41 families.
