= Qodratabad, Rigan =

Qodratabad قدرت اباد
- Village
- Location within Iran
- Coordinates: 28°37′01″N 59°07′45″E
- Country: Iran
- Province: Kerman
- County: Rigan
- Bakhsh: Central
- Rural District: Rigan

Population (2006)
  - Total: 80
- Time zone: UTC+3:30 (IRST)
  - Summer (DST): UTC+4:30 (IRDT)

Qodratabad (Persian: قدرت اباد, also Romanized as Qodratābād) is a village in Rigan Rural District, in the Central District of Rigan County, Kerman Province, Iran. At the 2006 census, its population was 80, in 16 families.
