= Chamtar Khan-e Olya =

Chamtar Khan-e Olya چمترخان عليا
- Village
- Location within Iran
- Coordinates: 31°58′16″N 48°46′04″E
- Country: Iran
- Province: Khuzestan
- County: Shushtar
- Bakhsh: Shadravan
- Rural District: Shoaybiyeh-ye Gharbi

Population (2006)
  - Total: 533
- Time zone: UTC+3:30 (IRST)
  - Summer (DST): UTC+4:30 (IRDT)

Chamtar Khan-e Olya (Persian: چمترخان عليا, also Romanized as Chamtar Khān-e ‘Olyā; also known as Asadollāh, Asadullah, Boneh-ye Mollā Mehdī, Cham Tarkhān, Chamtar Khān Asadollāh, Chamtar Khān-e Bālā, and Kabūtār Khān-e ‘Olyā) is a village in Shoaybiyeh-ye Gharbi Rural District, Shadravan District, Shushtar County, Khuzestan Province, Iran. At the 2006 census, its population was 533, in 105 families.
