= Chamtar Khan-e Sofla =

Chamtar Khan-e Sofla چمترخان سفلي
- Village
- Location within Iran
- Coordinates: 31°57′28″N 48°46′44″E
- Country: Iran
- Province: Khuzestan
- County: Shushtar
- Bakhsh: Shadravan
- Rural District: Shoaybiyeh-ye Gharbi

Population (2006)
  - Total: 179
- Time zone: UTC+3:30 (IRST)
  - Summer (DST): UTC+4:30 (IRDT)

Chamtar Khan-e Sofla (Persian: چمترخان سفلي, also Romanized as Chamtar Khān-e Soflá; also known as Chamtar Khān-e Pā’īn, Kabūtār Khān-e Soflā, and Khalaf-e Nabī) is a village in Shoaybiyeh-ye Gharbi Rural District, Shadravan District, Shushtar County, Khuzestan province, Iran. At the 2006 census, its population was 179, in 38 families.
