= Qodratabad, Khuzestan =

Qodratabad قدرت اباد
- Village
- Location within Iran
- Coordinates: 31°39′17″N 48°01′42″E
- Country: Iran
- Province: Khuzestan
- County: Dasht-e Azadegan
- Bakhsh: Bostan
- Rural District: Bostan

Population (2006)
  - Total: 232
- Time zone: UTC+3:30 (IRST)
  - Summer (DST): UTC+4:30 (IRDT)

Qodratabad (Persian: قدرت اباد, also Romanized as Qodratābād; also known as Alb-e Ḩamādī, Ālb-e Ḩemādī, and Omm ol Chīr) is a village in Bostan Rural District, Bostan District, Dasht-e Azadegan County, Khuzestan Province, Iran. At the 2006 census, its population was 232, in 42 families.
