= Razmavaran Rural District =

Rural district in Kerman province, Iran

Razmavaran Rural District Persian: دهستان رزم آوران
- Rural District
- Location within Iran
- Coordinates: 30°28′05″N 55°53′15″E
- Country: Iran
- Province: Kerman
- County: Rafsanjan
- District: Central
- Capital: Lahijan

Population (2016)
  - Total: 8,766
- Time zone: UTC+3:30 (IRST)

Razmavaran Rural District (Persian: دهستان رزم آوران) is in the Central District of Rafsanjan County, Kerman province, Iran. Its capital is the village of Lahijan.

== Demographics ==
=== Population ===
At the time of the 2006 National Census, the rural district's population was 7,512 in 1,794 households. There were 8,552 inhabitants in 2,327 households at the following census of 2011. The 2016 census measured the population of the rural district as 8,766 in 2,590 households. The most populous of its 32 villages was Lahijan, with 2,838 people.
