= Darreh Doran Rural District =

Rural district in Kerman province, Iran

Darreh Doran Rural District Persian: دهستان دره دران
- Rural District
- Location within Iran
- Coordinates: 30°31′55″N 56°14′34″E
- Country: Iran
- Province: Kerman
- County: Rafsanjan
- District: Central
- Capital: Davaran

Population (2016)
  - Total: 4,461
- Time zone: UTC+3:30 (IRST)

Darreh Doran Rural District (Persian: دهستان دره دران) is in the Central District of Rafsanjan County, Kerman province, Iran. Its capital is the village of Davaran.

== Demographics ==
=== Population ===
At the time of the 2006 National Census, the rural district's population was 2,493 in 695 households. There were 3,176 inhabitants in 867 households at the following census of 2011. The 2016 census measured the population of the rural district as 4,461 in 1,302 households. The most populous of its 39 villages was Davaran, with 2,631 people.
