= Eslamiyeh Rural District =

Rural district in Kerman province, Iran

Eslamiyeh Rural District Persian: دهستان اسلاميه
- Rural District
- Location within Iran
- Coordinates: 30°21′N 55°53′E
- Country: Iran
- Province: Kerman
- County: Rafsanjan
- District: Central
- Capital: Hormozabad

Population (2016)
  - Total: 20,182
- Time zone: UTC+3:30 (IRST)

Eslamiyeh Rural District (Persian: دهستان اسلاميه) is in the Central District of Rafsanjan County, Kerman province, Iran. Its capital is the village of Hormozabad.

== Demographics ==
=== Population ===
At the time of the 2006 National Census, the rural district's population was 14,919 in 3,577 households. There were 18,350 inhabitants in 4,847 households at the following census of 2011. The 2016 census measured the population of the rural district as 20,182 in 5,979 households. The most populous of its 82 villages was Eslamabad, with 5,662 people.
