= Sarcheshmeh Rural District =

Rural district in Kerman province, Iran

Sarcheshmeh Rural District Persian: دهستان سرچشمه
- Rural District
- Location within Iran
- Coordinates: 30°06′34″N 55°59′15″E
- Country: Iran
- Province: Kerman
- County: Rafsanjan
- District: Central
- Capital: Mes-e Sarcheshmeh

Population (2016)
  - Total: 1,716
- Time zone: UTC+3:30 (IRST)

Sarcheshmeh Rural District (Persian: دهستان سرچشمه) is in the Central District of Rafsanjan County, Kerman province, Iran. It is administered from the city of Mes-e Sarcheshmeh. (Note: English: "Sarcheshmeh Copper Town;" formerly Shahrak-e Madan ("Mine Village"))

== Demographics ==
=== Population ===
At the time of the 2006 National Census, the rural district's population was 513 in 171 households. There were 1,265 inhabitants in 388 households at the following census of 2011. The 2016 census measured the population of the rural district as 1,716 in 553 households. The most populous of its 160 villages was Dehuiyeh, with 244 people.
