= Azadegan Rural District (Rafsanjan County) =

Rural district in Kerman province, Iran

Azadegan Rural District Persian: دهستان آزادگان
- Rural District
- Location within Iran
- Coordinates: 30°35′37″N 55°58′48″E
- Country: Iran
- Province: Kerman
- County: Rafsanjan
- District: Central
- Capital: Rezaabad

Population (2016)
  - Total: 14,427
- Time zone: UTC+3:30 (IRST)

Azadegan Rural District (Persian: دهستان آزادگان) is in the Central District of Rafsanjan County, Kerman province, Iran. Its capital is the village of Rezaabad.

== Demographics ==
=== Population ===
At the time of the 2006 National Census, the rural district's population was 11,930 in 2,905 households. There were 13,683 inhabitants in 3,798 households at the following census of 2011. The 2016 census measured the population of the rural district as 14,427 in 4,383 households. The most populous of its 58 villages was Jafarabad, with 2,222 people.
