= Khenaman Rural District =

Rural district in Kerman province, Iran

Khenaman Rural District Persian: دهستان خنامان
- Rural District
- Location within Iran
- Coordinates: 30°29′01″N 56°32′05″E
- Country: Iran
- Province: Kerman
- County: Rafsanjan
- District: Central
- Capital: Khenaman

Population (2016)
  - Total: 1,966
- Time zone: UTC+3:30 (IRST)

Khenaman Rural District (Persian: دهستان خنامان) is in the Central District of Rafsanjan County, Kerman province, Iran. Its capital is the village of Khenaman.

== Demographics ==
=== Population ===
At the time of the 2006 National Census, the rural district's population was 1,749 in 530 households. There were 2,220 inhabitants in 682 households at the following census of 2011. The 2016 census measured the population of the rural district as 1,966 in 671 households. The most populous of its 14 villages was Khenaman, with 431 people.
