= Bahreman Rural District =

Rural district in Kerman province, Iran

Bahreman Rural District Persian: دهستان بهرمان
- Rural District
- Location within Iran
- Coordinates: 31°00′48″N 55°34′16″E
- Country: Iran
- Province: Kerman
- County: Rafsanjan
- District: Nuq
- Capital: Bahreman

Population (2016)
  - Total: 8,690
- Time zone: UTC+3:30 (IRST)

Bahreman Rural District (Persian: دهستان بهرمان) is in Nuq District of Rafsanjan County, Kerman province, Iran. It is administered from the city of Bahreman.

== Demographics ==
=== Population ===
At the time of the 2006 National Census, the rural district's population was 6,956 in 1,731 households. There were 8,113 inhabitants in 2,184 households at the following census of 2011. The 2016 census measured the population of the rural district as 8,690 in 2,411 households. The most populous of its 76 villages was Javadiyeh ol Hiyeh (now a city), with 4,132 people.
