= Nuq District =

District in Kerman province, Iran

Nuq District Persian: بخش نوق
- District
- Location within Iran
- Coordinates: 31°00′48″N 55°34′16″E
- Country: Iran
- Province: Kerman
- County: Rafsanjan
- Capital: Bahreman

Population (2016)
  - Total: 13,955
- Time zone: UTC+3:30 (IRST)

Nuq District (Persian: بخش نوق) is in Rafsanjan County, Kerman province, Iran. Its capital is the city of Bahreman.

== History ==
After the 2016 National Census, the village of Javadiyeh ol Hiyeh was elevated to the status of a city.

== Demographics ==
=== Population ===
At the time of the 2006 census, the district's population was 11,361 in 2,840 households. The following census in 2011 counted 12,641 people in 3,454 households. The 2016 census measured the population of the district as 13,955 inhabitants in 3,885 households.

=== Administrative divisions ===
Nuq District Population
Administrative Divisions	2006	2011	2016
Bahreman RD	6,956	8,113	8,690
Bahreman (city)	4,405	4,528	5,265
Javadiyeh ol Hiyeh (city) (Note: Became a city after the 2016 census)			
Total	11,361	12,641	13,955
RD = Rural District
