= Central District (Rafsanjan County) =

District in Kerman province, Iran

Central District (Rafsanjan County) Persian: بخش مرکزی شهرستان رفسنجان
- District
- Location within Iran
- Coordinates: 30°19′22″N 56°11′03″E
- Country: Iran
- Province: Kerman
- County: Rafsanjan
- Capital: Rafsanjan

Population (2016)
  - Total: 255,377
- Time zone: UTC+3:30 (IRST)

The Central District of Rafsanjan County (Persian: بخش مرکزی شهرستان رفسنجان) is in Kerman province, Iran. Its capital is the city of Rafsanjan.

== Demographics ==
=== Population ===
At the time of the 2006 National Census, the district's population was 211,495 in 52,055 households. The following census in 2011 counted 237,265 people in 62,865 households. The 2016 census measured the population of the district as 255,377 inhabitants in 74,962 households.

=== Administrative divisions ===
Central District (Rafsanjan County) Population
Administrative Divisions	2006	2011	2016
Azadegan RD	11,930	13,683	14,427
Darreh Doran RD	2,493	3,176	4,461
Eslamiyeh RD	14,919	18,350	20,182
Kabutar Khan RD	10,110	10,545	12,114
Khenaman RD	1,749	2,202	1,966
Qasemabad RD	17,430	21,646	23,869
Razmavaran RD	7,512	8,552	8,766
Sarcheshmeh RD	513	1,285	1,716
Mes-e Sarcheshmeh (city)	8,451	6,406	5,967
Rafsanjan (city)	136,388	151,420	161,909
Total	211,495	237,265	255,377
RD = Rural District
