= Rafsanjan County =

County in Kerman province, Iran

Rafsanjan County Persian: شهرستان رفسنجان
- County
- Location of Rafsanjan County in Kerman province (top left, purple)

- Location of Kerman province in Iran
- Coordinates: 30°35′N 55°59′E
- Country: Iran
- Province: Kerman
- Capital: Rafsanjan
- Districts: Central, Ferdows, Koshkuiyeh, Nuq

Population (2016)
  - Total: 311,214
- Time zone: UTC+3:30 (IRST)

Rafsanjan County (Persian: شهرستان رفسنجان) is in Kerman province, Iran. Its capital is the city of Rafsanjan.

== History ==
After the 2006 National Census, Anar District was separated from the county in the establishment of Anar County. The village of Ferdowsiyeh was elevated to city status as Safayyeh. After the 2016 census, the village of Javadiyeh ol Hiyeh was elevated to the status of a city.

== Demographics ==
=== Population ===
At the time of the 2006 census, the county's population was 291,417, in 71,830 households. The following census in 2011 counted 287,921 people in 76,797 households. The 2016 census measured the population of the county as 311,214 in 91,511 households.

=== Administrative divisions ===
Rafsanjan County's population history and administrative structure over three consecutive censuses are shown in the following table.

Rafsanjan County Population
Administrative Divisions	2006	2011	2016
Central District	211,495	237,265	255,377
Azadegan RD	11,930	13,683	14,427
Darreh Doran RD	2,493	3,176	4,461
Eslamiyeh RD	14,919	18,350	20,182
Kabutar Khan RD	10,110	10,545	12,114
Khenaman RD	1,749	2,202	1,966
Qasemabad RD	17,430	21,646	23,869
Razmavaran RD	7,512	8,552	8,766
Sarcheshmeh RD	513	1,285	1,716
Mes-e Sarcheshmeh (city)	8,451	6,406	5,967
Rafsanjan (city)	136,388	151,420	161,909
Anar District (Note: Transferred to Anar County)	31,554		
Bayaz RD	8,325		
Hoseynabad RD	6,394		
Aminshahr (city)	4,044		
Anar (city)	12,791		
Ferdows District	14,959	15,818	19,020
Ferdows RD	6,889	5,517	5,874
Rezvan RD	8,070	8,068	10,668
Safayyeh (city) (Note: Formerly the village of Ferdowsiyeh)		2,233	2,478
Koshkuiyeh District	22,048	20,587	22,133
Koshkuiyeh RD	5,995	5,325	5,969
Raviz RD	1,374	1,012	1,420
Sharifabad RD	8,529	7,640	7,100
Koshkuiyeh (city)	6,150	6,610	7,644
Nuq District	11,361	12,641	13,955
Bahreman RD	6,956	8,113	8,690
Bahreman (city)	4,405	4,528	5,265
Javadiyeh ol Hiyeh (city) (Note: Became a city after the 2016 census)			
Total	291,417	287,921	311,214
RD = Rural District

== Notable people ==
Former Iranian president Akbar Hashemi Rafsanjani was born in the city of Bahreman.

== See also ==
Media related to Rafsanjan County at Wikimedia Commons
