= Hemmatabad (disambiguation) =

Hemmatabad (Persian: همت آباد) is a city in Razavi Khorasan Province, Iran

Hemmatabad may also refer to:

== Alborz Province ==
- Hemmatabad, Alborz, a village in Nazarabad County, Alborz Province, Iran

== Fars Province ==
- Hemmatabad, Pasargad, a village in Pasargad County
- Hemmatabad, Shiraz, a village in Shiraz County

== Golestan Province ==
- Hemmatabad-e Sistaniha, a village in Kalaleh County
- Hemmatabad, Maraveh Tappeh, a village in Maraveh Tappeh County
- Hemmatabad, Ramian, a village in Ramian County

== Isfahan Province ==
- Hemmatabad, Ardestan, a village in Ardestan County
- Hemmatabad, Najafabad, a village in Najafabad County

== Kerman Province ==
- Hemmatabad, Bam, a village in Bam County
- Hemmatabad-e Olya, Kerman, a village in Kerman County
- Hemmatabad-e Sofla, a village in Kerman County
- Hemmatabad, Kuhbanan, a village in Kuhbanan County
- Hemmatabad, Rud Ab, a village in Narmashir County
- Hemmatabad, Rafsanjan, a village in Rafsanjan County
- Hemmatabad-e Agah, a village in Rafsanjan County
- Hemmatabad-e Olya, Rafsanjan, a village in Rafsanjan County
- Hemmatabad-e Chah-e Malek, a village in Rigan County
- Hemmatabad-e Gol Mohammad, a village in Rigan County
- Hemmatabad-e Vahab, a village in Rigan County
- Hemmatabad-e Chah Zahra-ye Bala, a village in Sirjan County
- Hemmatabad, Zarand, a village in Zarand County

== Kermanshah Province ==
- Hemmatabad, Kermanshah, a village in Sahneh County

== Lorestan Province ==
- Hemmatabad, Borujerd, a village in Borujerd County, Lorestan Province, Iran
- Hemmatabad, Delfan, a village in Delfan County, Lorestan Province, Iran
- Hemmatabad Rural District, an administrative subdivision of Lorestan Province

== Mazandaran Province ==
- Hemmatabad, Amol, a village in Amol County
- Hemmatabad, Sari, a village in Sari County
- Hemmatabad, Tonekabon, a village in Tonekabon County

== Qazvin Province ==
- Hemmatabad, Qazvin, a village in Qazvin Province, Iran

== Qom Province ==
- Hemmatabad, Qom, a village in Qom Province, Iran

== Razavi Khorasan Province ==
- Hemmatabad, a city in Firuzeh County
- Hemmatabad, Bakharz, a village in Bakharz County
- Hemmatabad-e Zamani, a village in Firuzeh County
- Hemmatabad, Mahvelat, a village in Mahvelat County
- Hemmatabad, Kenevist, a village in Mashhad County
- Hemmatabad, Tabadkan, a village in Mashhad County
- Hemmatabad (Qaleh Masharaf), Tabadkan, a village in Mashhad County
- Hemmatabad-e Chalaki, a village in Quchan County
- Hemmatabad, Torbat-e Jam, a village in Torbat-e Jam County

== Semnan Province ==
- Hemmatabad, Semnan, a village in Meyami County, Semnan Province

== Sistan and Baluchestan Province ==
- Hemmatabad, Sistan and Baluchestan, a village in Sistan and Baluchestan Province, Iran

== South Khorasan Province ==
- Hemmatabad, Khusf, a village in Khusf County
- Hemmatabad, Sarbisheh, a village in Sarbisheh County
- Hemmatabad, Tabas, a village in Tabas County
- Hemmatabad, Dastgerdan, a village in Tabas County
- Hemmatabad, Zirkuh, a village in Zirkuh County

== West Azerbaijan ==
- Hemmatabad, West Azerbaijan, a village in Salmas County

== Yazd Province ==
- Hemmatabad, Ardakan, a village in Ardakan County
- Hemmatabad, Saduq, a village in Saduq County
- Hemmatabad, Nasrabad, a village in Taft County
