= Ziarat (disambiguation) =

Ziarat, ziyarat or ziyarah may refer to the following:

== Religion ==
- Ziyarat, a form of pilgrimage in Islam

== Places ==
=== Iran ===
Ziarat is a common element in Iranian place names; see

- Ziarat Rural District (disambiguation)

==== Bushehr Province ====
- Ziarat, Dashtestan, Bushehr Province, Iran
- Ziarat, Dashti, Bushehr Province, Iran

==== Golestan Province ====
- Ziarat, Golestan, Iran

==== Hormozgan Province ====
- Ziarat, Bandar Abbas, Hormozgan Province, Iran
- Ziarat, Bandar Lengeh, Hormozgan Province, Iran
- Ziarat, Parsian, Hormozgan Province
- Ziarat, Rudan, Hormozgan Province
- Ziarat-e Ali, Hormozgan Province, Iran
- Ziarat-e Bozorg, Hormozgan Province, Iran
- Ziarat-e Hasanabad, Hormozgan Province, Iran
- Ziarat Mowla, Hormozgan Province, Iran
- Ziarat-e Pakuh, Hormozgan Province, Iran
- Ziarat-e Pirchugan, Hormozgan Province, Iran
- Ziarat-e Seyyed Soleyman, Hormozgan Province, Iran
- Ziarat-e Talang, Hormozgan Province, Iran

==== Kerman Province ====
- Ziarat, Kerman, Kerman Province
- Ziarat, Qaleh Ganj, Kerman Province
- Ziarat-e Bacheh, Kerman Province
- Ziarat-e Hezart Abbas, Kerman Province, Iran
- Ziarat-e Kot-e Gorg, Kerman Province, Iran
- Ziyarat Boneh, Kerman Province
- Ziyarat Shah, Kerman Province

==== Mazandaran Province ====
- Ziarat Var, a village in Abbasabad County

==== North Khorasan Province ====
- Ziarat, North Khorasan, Iran

==== Razavi Khorasan Province ====
- Ziarat, Mashhad, a village in Razavi Khorasan Province, Iran
- Ziarat, Nishapur, a village in Razavi Khorasan Province, Iran

==== Sistan and Baluchestan Province ====
- Ziarat, Dalgan, a village in Dalgan County
- Ziyarat-e Miromar, a village in Dalgan County
- Ziarat Konar, a village in Khash County

==== South Khorasan Province ====
- Ziarat-e Seyyed Ali, South Khorasan Province, Iran

=== Pakistan ===
- Ziarat, a town in Balochistan, Pakistan
  - Ziarat District

=== Syria ===
- al-Ziyarah, a village in the Hama Governorate, Syria
- al-Ziyarah Nahiyah, a subdistrict of the Qalaat al-Madiq District of Hama Governorate
