= Vakilabad =

Vakilabad (Persian: وكيل اباد) may refer to:

- Vakilabad, Ardabil, in Ardabil County, Ardabil Province, Iran
- Vakilabad, Fasa, in Fasa County, Fars Province, Iran
- Vakilabad, Sheshdeh and Qarah Bulaq, in Fasa County, Fars Province, Iran
- Vakilabad, Pasargad, in Pasargad County, Fars Province, Iran
- Vakilabad, Arzuiyeh, in Arzuiyeh County, Kerman Province, Iran
- Vakilabad Rural District, in Arzuiyeh County, Kerman Province, Iran
- Vakilabad, Baft, in Baft County, Kerman Province, Iran
- Vakilabad, Narmashir, in Narmashir County, Kerman Province, Iran
- Vakilabad, Qaleh Ganj, in Qaleh Ganj County, Kerman Province, Iran
- Vakilabad, Koshkuiyeh, in Rafsanjan County, Kerman Province, Iran
- Vakilabad, Rigan, in Rigan County, Kerman Province, Iran
- Vakilabad, Gavkan, in Rigan County, Kerman Province, Iran
- Vakilabad-e Pain Jam, in Razavi Khorasan Province, Iran
- Vakilabad Prison, in Mashhad, Iran
- Vakilabad Highway, in Mashad, Iran
