= Sadabad, Rigan =

Village in Kerman province, Iran

Sadabad Persian: سعداباد
- Village
- Location within Iran
- Coordinates: 28°37′36″N 59°03′56″E
- Country: Iran
- Province: Kerman
- County: Rigan
- District: Rahmatabad
- Rural District: Sadabad

Population (2016)
  - Total: 1,643
- Time zone: UTC+3:30 (IRST)

Sadabad (Persian: سعداباد) (Note: Also romanized as Sa‘dābād; also known as Sa‘īdābād) is a village in, and the capital of, Sadabad Rural District of Rahmatabad District, Rigan County, Kerman province, Iran.

== Demographics ==
=== Population ===
At the time of the 2006 National Census, the village's population was 1,055 in 233 households, when it was in Rigan Rural District of the former Rigan District of Bam County. The following census in 2011 counted 1,214 people in 330 households, by which time the district had been separated from the county in the establishment of Rigan County. The rural district was transferred to the new Central District. The 2016 census measured the population of the village as 1,643 people in 502 households.

In 2023, Gavkan Rural District was separated from the district in the establishment of Rahmatabad District, and Sadabad was transferred to Sadabad Rural District created in the new district.
