= Mirabad-e Emam Qoli =

Village in Kerman province, Iran

Mirabad-e Emam Qoli Persian: ميراباد امامقلي
- Village
- Location within Iran
- Coordinates: 28°44′42″N 58°59′04″E
- Country: Iran
- Province: Kerman
- County: Gonbaki
- District: Naseiyeh
- Rural District: Kahur Khoshk

Population (2016)
  - Total: 922
- Time zone: UTC+3:30 (IRST)

Mirabad-e Emam Qoli (Persian: ميرابادامامقلي) (Note: Also romanized as Mīrābād-e Emām Qolī; also known as Mīrābād) is a village in, and the capital of, Kahur Khoshk Rural District of Naseriyeh District, Gonbaki County, Kerman province, Iran.

In 2013, the remains of a Sasanid-era Zoroastrian fire temple were discovered at Mirabad-e Emam Qoli.

== Demographics ==
=== Population ===
At the time of the 2006 National Census, the village's population was 690 in 157 households, when it was in Chahdegal Rural District of the former Rigan District of Bam County. The following census in 2011 counted 827 people in 219 households, by which time the rural district had been separated from the county in the establishment of Fahraj County. The village was transferred to Naseriyeh Rural District created in the new Gonbaki District (Note: Renamed the Central District of Gonbaki County) of Rigan County. The 2016 census measured the population of the village as 922 people in 274 households.

In 2023, the district was separated from the county in the establishment of Gonbaki County and renamed the Central District, and the rural district was transferred to the new Naseriyeh District.
