= Sorkh-e Kan =

Sorkh-e Kan or Sorkh Kan or Sorkhkan or Sorkhekan or Sorkhakan (Persian: سرخكان or سرخ كان), also rendered as Sorkhegan or Sorkhagan, may refer to:

- Sorkh-e Kan, Ilam
- Sorkh-e Kan, Anbarabad, Kerman Province
- Sorkhakan, Bardsir, Kerman Province
- Sorkh-e Kan, Rigan, Kerman Province
- Sorkh-e Kan, alternate name of Sarneran, Rigan County, Kerman Province
- Sorkh Kan, Khuzestan
- Sorkhkan, Khash, Sistan and Baluchestan Province

== See also ==
- Kan Sorkh
