= Ziyarat Shah =

Village in Kerman province, Iran

Ziyarat Shah Persian: زيارت شاه
- Village
- Location within Iran
- Coordinates: 28°21′04″N 58°36′47″E
- Country: Iran
- Province: Kerman
- County: Gonbaki
- District: Central
- Rural District: Ziarat

Population (2016)
  - Total: 425
- Time zone: UTC+3:30 (IRST)

Ziyarat Shah (Persian: زيارت شاه) (Note: Also romanized as Zīyārat Shāh; also known as Zīārat)) is a village in, and the capital of, Ziarat Rural District of the Central District (Note: Formerly Gonbaki District of Rigan County) of Gonbaki County, Kerman province, Iran.

== Demographics ==
=== Population ===
At the time of the 2006 National Census, the village's population was 629 in 121 households, when it was in Gavkan Rural District of the former Rigan District of Bam County. The following census in 2011 counted 547 people in 128 households, by which time the district had been separated from the county in the establishment of Rigan County. Ziyarat Shah was transferred to Naseriyeh Rural District created in the new Gonbaki District. (Note: Renamed the Central District of Gonbaki County) The 2016 census measured the population of the village as 425 people in 126 households.

In 2023, the district was separated from the county in the establishment of Gonbaki County and renamed the Central District, and Ziyarat Shah was transferred to Ziarat Rural District created in the district.
