= Naseriyeh =

Naseriyeh (Persian: ناصريه) may refer to:

- Naseriyeh, Arzuiyeh
- Naseriyeh, Rafsanjan
- Naseriyeh, Gonbaki, a village in Gonbaki County, Kerman province
- Naseriyeh, Sirjan
- Naseriyeh District, an administrative division of Gonbaki County, Kerman province
- Naseriyeh Rural District, an administrative division of Gonbaki County, Kerman province
