= Ziaratgah =

Ziaratgah or Ziyaratgah or Zeyaratgah (Persian: زيارتگاه) may refer to several places in Iran:

- Ziaratgah, Gilan
- Ziaratgah, Ardestan, Isfahan Province
- Ziaratgah, Shahreza, Isfahan Province
- Ziaratgah, Rayen, Kerman Province
- Ziaratgah, Shahdad, Kerman Province
- Ziaratgah, South Khorasan
- Ziaratgah-e Bibi Hanna, Fars Province
- Ziaratgah-e Mir Meghdad
- Ziaratgah-e Pir Almas
- Ziaratgah-e Shah Savaran
