= Aliabad-e Mohammad Qasem Khan =

Village in Kerman province, Iran

Aliabad-e Mohammad Qasem Khan Persian: علي اباد محمد قاسم خان
- Village
- Location within Iran
- Coordinates: 28°45′09″N 58°57′34″E
- Country: Iran
- Province: Kerman
- County: Gonbaki
- District: Naseriyeh
- Rural District: Naseriyeh

Population (2016)
  - Total: 1,196
- Time zone: UTC+3:30 (IRST)

Aliabad-e Mohammad Qasem Khan (Persian: علي ابادمحمدقاسم خان) (Note: Also romanized as ‘Alīābād-e Moḩammad Qāsem Khān) is a village in Naseriyeh Rural District of Naseriyeh District, Gonbaki County, Kerman province, Iran.

== Demographics ==
=== Population ===
At the time of the 2006 National Census, the village's population was 876 in 201 households, when it was in Chahdegal Rural District of the former Rigan District of Bam County. The following census in 2011 counted 785 people in 230 households, by which time the rural district had been separated from the county in the establishment of Fahraj County. The village was transferred to Naseriyeh Rural District created in the new Gonbaki District (Note: Renamed the Central District of Gonbaki County) of Rigan County. The 2016 census measured the population of the village as 1,196 people in 291 households. It was the most populous village in its rural district.

In 2023, the district was separated from the county in the establishment of Gonbaki County and renamed the Central District, and the rural district was transferred to the new Naseriyeh District.
