= Gonbaki =

Gonbaki (Persian: گنبکی) may refer to:

- Gonbaki, Kerman, a city in Gonbaki County, Kerman province
- Gonbaki County, an administrative division of Kerman province
- Gonbaki District, a former administrative division of Gonbaki County, Kerman province
- Gonbaki Rural District, an administrative division of Gonbaki County, Kerman province
