= Aliabad, Gonbaki =

Neighborhood in Kerman province, Iran

Aliabad Persian: علي اباد
- Neighborhood
- Location within Iran
- Coordinates: 28°43′36″N 58°52′00″E
- Country: Iran
- Province: Kerman
- County: Gonbaki
- District: Central
- City: Gonbaki

Population (2011)
  - Total: 0
- Time zone: UTC+3:30 (IRST)

Aliabad (Persian: علي اباد) (Note: Also romanized as ‘Alīābād; also known as ‘Alīābād-e Asadpoūr and ‘Alīābād-e Moḩammad Qāsem Khān) is a neighborhood in the city of Gonbaki in the Central District of Gonbaki County, Kerman province, Iran.

== Demographics ==
=== Population ===
At the time of the 2006 National Census, Aliabad's population was 328 in 71 households, when it was a village in Gonbaki Rural District of the former Rigan District in Bam County. The following census in 2011 counted zero people, by which time the district had been separated from the county in the establishment of Rigan County. The rural district was transferred to the new Gonbaki District.

In 2011, the village of Mohammadabad-e Gonbaki merged with the villages of Abbasabad, Aliabad, Behtarabad, Dowlatabad, Hasanabad, and Jannatabad to become the city of Gonbaki. In 2023, the district was separated from the county in the establishment of Gonbaki County.
