= Hojjatabad, Gonbaki =

Village in Kerman province, Iran

Hojjatabad Persian: حجت اباد
- Village
- Location within Iran
- Coordinates: 28°42′07″N 58°52′16″E
- Country: Iran
- Province: Kerman
- County: Gonbaki
- District: Central
- Rural District: Gonbaki

Population (2016)
  - Total: 725
- Time zone: UTC+3:30 (IRST)

Hojjatabad (Persian: حجت اباد) (Note: Also romanized as Ḩojjatābād) is a village in Gonbaki Rural District of the Central District of Gonbaki County, Kerman province, Iran.

== Demographics ==
=== Population ===
At the time of the 2006 National Census, the village's population was 320 in 66 households, when it was in the former Rigan District of Bam County. The following census in 2011 counted 378 people in 87 households, by which time the district had been separated from the county in the establishment of Rigan County. The rural district was transferred to the new Gonbaki District. The 2016 census measured the population of the village as 725 people in 194 households.

In 2023, the district was separated from the county in the establishment of Gonbaki County. The rural district was transferred to the new Central District.
