= Shaltukabad =

Village in Kerman province, Iran

Shaltukabad Persian: شلتوك اباد
- Village
- Location within Iran
- Coordinates: 28°44′53″N 58°51′32″E
- Country: Iran
- Province: Kerman
- County: Gonbaki
- District: Central
- Rural District: Gonbaki

Population (2016)
  - Total: 1,004
- Time zone: UTC+3:30 (IRST)

Shaltukabad (Persian: شلتوك اباد) (Note: Also romanized as Shaltūkābād; also known as Shaltūkābād-e Gonbagī) is a village in Gonbaki Rural District of the Central District of Gonbaki County, Kerman province, Iran.

== Demographics ==
=== Population ===
At the time of the 2006 National Census, the village's population was 828 in 200 households, when it was in the former Rigan District of Bam County. The following census in 2011 counted 887 people in 241 households, by which time the district had been separated from the county in the establishment of Rigan County. The rural district was transferred to the new Gonbaki District. (Note: Renamed the Central District of Gonbaki County) The 2016 census measured the population of the village as 1,004 people in 318 households. It was the most populous village in its rural district.

In 2023, the district was separated from the county in the establishment of Gonbaki County and renamed the Central District.
