= Aliabad-e Posht-e Rig =

Village in Kerman province, Iran

Aliabad-e Posht-e Rig Persian: علي اباد پشت ريگ
- Village
- Location within Iran
- Coordinates: 28°43′17″N 59°06′16″E
- Country: Iran
- Province: Kerman
- County: Rigan
- District: Central
- Rural District: Posht-e Rig

Population (2016)
  - Total: 1,379
- Time zone: UTC+3:30 (IRST)

Aliabad-e Posht-e Rig (Persian: علي ابادپشت ريگ) (Note: Also romanized as ‘Alīābād-e Posht Rīg and ‘Alīābād-e Posht-e Rīg; also known as ‘Alīābād and ‘Alīābād Yasht Rīg) is a village in, and the capital of, Posht-e Rig Rural District of the Central District of Rigan County, Kerman province, Iran.

== Demographics ==
=== Population ===
At the time of the 2006 National Census, the village's population was 765 in 201 households, when it was in Rigan Rural District of the former Rigan District of Bam County. The following census in 2011 counted 1,114 people in 296 households, by which time the district had been separated from the county in the establishment of Rigan County. The rural district was transferred to the new Central District. The 2016 census measured the population of the village as 1,379 people in 359 households.

In 2023, Aliabad-e Posht-e Rig was transferred to Posht-e Rig Rural District created in the Central District.
