= Naseriyeh, Gonbaki =

Village in Kerman province, Iran

Naseriyeh Persian: ناصريه
- Village
- Location within Iran
- Coordinates: 28°41′46″N 58°57′36″E
- Country: Iran
- Province: Kerman
- County: Gonbaki
- District: Naseriyeh
- Rural District: Naseriyeh

Population (2016)
  - Total: 588
- Time zone: UTC+3:30 (IRST)

Naseriyeh (Persian: ناصريه) (Note: Also romanized as Nāşerīyeh) is a village in Naseriyeh Rural District of Naseriyeh District, Gonbaki County, Kerman province, Iran, and serves as capital of the district. It was the capital of Naseriyeh Rural District until its capital was transferred to the village of Mehdiabad-e Olya.

== Demographics ==
=== Population ===
At the time of the 2006 National Census, the village's population was 345 in 61 households, when it was in Gonbaki Rural District of the former Rigan District of Bam County. The following census in 2011 counted 459 people in 112 households, by which time the rural district had been separated from the county in the establishment of Rigan County. Naseriyeh was transferred to Naseriyeh Rural District created in the new Gonbaki District. The 2016 census measured the population of the village as 588 people in 164 households. (Note: Renamed the Central District of Gonbaki County)

In 2023, the district was separated from the county in the establishment of Gonbaki County and renamed the Central District, and the rural district was transferred to the new Naseriyeh District.
