= Kahur Khoshk Rural District =

Rural district in Kerman province, Iran

Kahur Khoshk Rural District Persian: دهستان کهور خشک
- Rural District
- Location within Iran
- Coordinates: 28°44′42″N 58°59′04″E
- Country: Iran
- Province: Kerman
- County: Gonbaki
- District: Naseriyeh
- Capital: Mirabad-e Emam Qoli
- Time zone: UTC+3:30 (IRST)

Kahur Khoshk Rural District (Persian: دهستان کهور خشک) is in Naseriyeh District of Gonbaki County, Kerman province, Iran. Its capital is the village of Mirabad-e Emam Qoli, whose population at the time of the 2016 National Census was 922 in 274 households.

== History ==
After the 2006 census, Rigan District was separated from Bam County in the establishment of Rigan County, which was divided into two districts of two rural districts each, with Mohammadabad as its capital and only city at the time.

In 2023, Gonbaki District (Note: Renamed the Central District of Gonbaki County) was separated from the county in the establishment of Gonbaki County and renamed the Central District, and Kahur Khoshk Rural District was created in the new Naseriyeh District.
