= Dahaneh-ye Abbasali =

Village in Kerman province, Iran

Dahaneh-ye Abbasali Persian: دهنه عباسعلي
- Village
- Location within Iran
- Coordinates: 28°12′50″N 58°52′53″E
- Country: Iran
- Province: Kerman
- County: Rigan
- District: Rahmatabad
- Rural District: Gavkan

Population (2016)
  - Total: 539
- Time zone: UTC+3:30 (IRST)

Dahaneh-ye Abbasali (Persian: دهنه عباسعلي) (Note: Also romanized as Dahaneh-ye ‘Abbās‘alī) is a village in, and the capital of, Gavkan Rural District of Rahmatabad District, Rigan County, Kerman province, Iran.

== Demographics ==
=== Population ===
At the time of the 2006 National Census, the village's population was 368 in 72 households, when it was in the former Rigan District of Bam County. The following census in 2011 counted 390 people in 108 households, by which time the district had been separated from the county in the establishment of Rigan County. The rural district was transferred to the new Central District. The 2016 census measured the population of the village as 539 people in 120 households. It was the most populous village in its rural district.

In 2023, the rural district was separated from the district in the formation of Rahmatabad District.
