= Hasanabad, Gonbaki =

Neighborhood in Kerman province, Iran

Hasanabad Persian: حسن آباد
- Neighborhood
- Location within Iran
- Coordinates: 28°43′26″N 58°52′01″E
- Country: Iran
- Province: Kerman
- County: Gonbaki
- District: Central
- City: Gonbaki

Population (2011)
  - Total: 3,827
- Time zone: UTC+3:30 (IRST)

Hasanabad (Persian: حسن آباد) (Note: Also romanized as Ḩasanābād; also known as Golzār (گلزار) and Golzār-e Kohneh) is a neighborhood in the city of Gonbaki in the Central District of Gonbaki County, Kerman province, Iran.

== Demographics ==
=== Population ===
At the time of the 2006 National Census, Hasanabad's population was 1,863 in 433 households, when it was a village in Gonbaki Rural District of the former Rigan District in Bam County. The following census in 2011 counted 3,827 people in 1,015 households, by which time the district had been separated from the county in the establishment of Rigan County. The rural district was transferred to the new Gonbaki District.

In 2011, the village of Mohammadabad-e Gonbaki merged with the villages of Abbasabad, Aliabad, Behtarabad, Dowlatabad, Hasanabad, and Jannatabad to become the city of Gonbaki. In 2023, the district was separated from the county in the establishment of Gonbaki County.
