= Sadabad Rural District =

Rural district in Kerman province, Iran

Sadabad Rural District Persian: دهستان سعدآباد
- Rural District
- Location within Iran
- Coordinates: 28°37′36″N 59°03′56″E
- Country: Iran
- Province: Kerman
- County: Rigan
- District: Rahmatabad
- Capital: Sadabad
- Time zone: UTC+3:30 (IRST)

Sadabad Rural District (Persian: دهستان سعدآباد) is in Rahmatabad District of Rigan County, Kerman province, Iran. Its capital is the village of Sadabad, whose population at the time of the 2016 National Census was 1,643 in 502 households.

== History ==
After the 2006 census, Rigan District was separated from Bam County in the establishment of Rigan County, which was divided into two districts of two rural districts each, with Mohammadabad as its capital and only city at the time.

In 2023, Gavkan Rural District was separated from the Central District in the establishment of Rahmatabad District, and Sadabad Rural District was created in the new district.
