= Pay-ye Sorkh =

Pay-ye Sorkh پاي سرخ
- Village
- Interactive map of Pay-ye Sorkh
- Country: Iran
- Province: Kerman
- County: Rigan
- Bakhsh: Central
- Rural District: Gavkan

Population (2006)
  - Total: 36
- Time zone: UTC+3:30 (IRST)
  - Summer (DST): UTC+4:30 (IRDT)

Pay-ye Sorkh (Persian: پاي سرخ, also Romanized as Pāy-ye Sorkh) is a village in Gavkan Rural District, in the Central District of Rigan County, Kerman Province, Iran. At the 2006 census, its population was 36, in 7 families.
