= Gurahi =

Gurahi گوره ائ
- Village
- Location within Iran
- Coordinates: 28°17′00″N 58°57′00″E
- Country: Iran
- Province: Kerman
- County: Rigan
- Bakhsh: Central
- Rural District: Gavkan

Population (2006)
  - Total: 161
- Time zone: UTC+3:30 (IRST)
  - Summer (DST): UTC+4:30 (IRDT)

Gurahi (Persian: گوره ائ, also Romanized as Gūrahī; also known as Gara”ī) is a village in Gavkan Rural District, in the Central District of Rigan County, Kerman Province, Iran. At the 2006 census, its population was 161, in 42 families.
