= Konartajagi =

Konartajagi كنارتجگي
- Village
- Location within Iran
- Coordinates: 28°07′53″N 58°58′02″E
- Country: Iran
- Province: Kerman
- County: Rigan
- Bakhsh: Central
- Rural District: Gavkan

Population (2006)
  - Total: 45
- Time zone: UTC+3:30 (IRST)
  - Summer (DST): UTC+4:30 (IRDT)

Konartajagi (Persian: كنارتجگي, also Romanized as Konārtajagī; also known as Konār Takkī) is a village in Gavkan Rural District, in the Central District of Rigan County, Kerman Province, Iran. At the 2006 census, its population was 45, in 8 families.
