= Zeynab-e Koshteh =

Zeynab-e Koshteh زينب كشته
- Village
- Location within Iran
- Coordinates: 28°19′12″N 58°43′34″E
- Country: Iran
- Province: Kerman
- County: Rigan
- Bakhsh: Central
- Rural District: Gavkan

Population (2006)
  - Total: 66
- Time zone: UTC+3:30 (IRST)
  - Summer (DST): UTC+4:30 (IRDT)

Zeynab-e Koshteh (Persian: زينب كشته) is a village in Gavkan Rural District, in the Central District of Rigan County, Kerman Province, Iran. At the 2006 census, its population was 66, in 14 families.
