= Halilehi =

Halilehi حليله اي
- Village
- Location within Iran
- Coordinates: 28°19′53″N 58°46′33″E
- Country: Iran
- Province: Kerman
- County: Rigan
- Bakhsh: Central
- Rural District: Gonbaki

Population (2006)
  - Total: 183
- Time zone: UTC+3:30 (IRST)
  - Summer (DST): UTC+4:30 (IRDT)

Halilehi (Persian: حليله اي, also Romanized as Ḩalīlehī and Ḩalīlehee) is a village in Gonbaki Rural District, in the Central District of Rigan County, Kerman Province, Iran. At the 2006 census, its population was 183, in 42 families.
