= Rustai-ye Chah-e Malek =

Rustai-ye Chah-e Malek روستاي چاه ملک
- Village
- Location within Iran
- Coordinates: 28°32′57″N 59°09′39″E
- Country: Iran
- Province: Kerman
- County: Rigan
- Bakhsh: Central
- Rural District: Rigan

Population (2006)
  - Total: 456
- Time zone: UTC+3:30 (IRST)
  - Summer (DST): UTC+4:30 (IRDT)

Rustai-ye Chah-e Malek (Persian: روستاي چاه ملک, also Romanized as Rūstāī-ye Chāh-e Malek; also known as Shahrak-e Chāhmalek) is a village in Rigan Rural District, in the Central District of Rigan County, Kerman Province, Iran. At the 2006 census, its population was 456, in 90 families.
