= Kutur =

Kutur كوتور
- Village
- Location within Iran
- Coordinates: 28°05′06″N 59°09′42″E
- Country: Iran
- Province: Kerman
- County: Rigan
- Bakhsh: Central
- Rural District: Gavkan

Population (2006)
  - Total: 71
- Time zone: UTC+3:30 (IRST)
  - Summer (DST): UTC+4:30 (IRDT)

Kutur (Persian: كوتور, also Romanized as Kūtūr) is a village in Gavkan Rural District, in the Central District of Rigan County, Kerman Province, Iran. At the 2006 census, its population was 71, in 15 families.
