= Deh-e Shayhak =

Deh-e Shayhak ده شيهك
- Village
- Location within Iran
- Coordinates: 28°37′13″N 59°09′19″E
- Country: Iran
- Province: Kerman
- County: Rigan
- Bakhsh: Central
- Rural District: Rigan

Population (2006)
  - Total: 49
- Time zone: UTC+3:30 (IRST)
  - Summer (DST): UTC+4:30 (IRDT)

Deh-e Shayhak (Persian: ده شيهك; also known as Dehshahyak) is a village in Rigan Rural District, in the Central District of Rigan County, Kerman Province, Iran. At the 2006 census, its population was 49, in 12 families.
