= Deh-e Rostam, Kerman =

Deh-e Rostam ده رستم
- Village
- Location within Iran
- Coordinates: 28°25′28″N 58°35′15″E
- Country: Iran
- Province: Kerman
- County: Rigan
- Bakhsh: Central
- Rural District: Gavkan

Population (2006)
  - Total: 37
- Time zone: UTC+3:30 (IRST)
  - Summer (DST): UTC+4:30 (IRDT)

Deh-e Rostam (Persian: ده رستم) is a village in Gavkan Rural District, in the Central District of Rigan County, Kerman Province, Iran. At the 2006 census, its population was 37, in 6 families.
