= Salmanabad =

Salmanabad (Persian: سلمان اباد) may refer to:

- Salmanabad, Ardabil
- Salmanabad, Savalan, Ardabil Province
- Salmanabad, Marvdasht, Fars Province
- Salmanabad, Anbarabad, Kerman Province
- Salmanabad, Rigan, Kerman Province
- Salmanabad, Razavi Khorasan
- Salmanabad, Fashapuyeh, a village in Fashapuyeh District, Rey County, Tehran Province
- Salmanabad, Kahrizak, a village in Kahrizak District, Rey County, Tehran Province
- Salmanabad, Varamin, a village in Varamin County, Tehran Province
- Salmanabad, West Azerbaijan
