= Cheshmeh-ye Rigi =

Cheshmeh-ye Rigi چشمه ريگي
- Village
- Country: Iran
- Province: Kerman
- County: Rigan
- Bakhsh: Central
- Rural District: Gavkan

Population (2006)
  - Total: 16
- Time zone: UTC+3:30 (IRST)
  - Summer (DST): UTC+4:30 (IRDT)

Cheshmeh-ye Rigi (Persian: چشمه ريگي, also Romanized as Cheshmeh-ye Rīgī) is a village in Gavkan Rural District, in the Central District of Rigan County, Kerman Province, Iran. At the 2006 census, its population was 16, in 4 families.
