= Bambuyan =

Bambuyan بمبويان
- Village
- Location within Iran
- Coordinates: 28°38′19″N 59°01′30″E
- Country: Iran
- Province: Kerman
- County: Rigan
- Bakhsh: Central
- Rural District: Rigan

Population (2006)
  - Total: 760
- Time zone: UTC+3:30 (IRST)
  - Summer (DST): UTC+4:30 (IRDT)

Bambuyan (Persian: بمبويان, also Romanized as Bambūyān; also known as Bambeyūn and Bambīūn) is a village in Rigan Rural District, in the Central District of Rigan County, Kerman Province, Iran. At the 2006 census, its population was 760, in 150 families.
