= Gol Gran Rig =

Gol Gran Rig گل گران ريگ
- Village
- Location within Iran
- Coordinates: 31°53′47″N 54°21′57″E
- Country: Iran
- Province: Kerman
- County: Rigan
- Bakhsh: Central
- Rural District: Gavkan

Population (2006)
  - Total: 69
- Time zone: UTC+3:30 (IRST)
  - Summer (DST): UTC+4:30 (IRDT)

Gol Gran Rig (Persian: گل گران ريگ, also Romanized as Gol Grān Rīg) is a village in Gavkan Rural District, in the Central District of Rigan County, Kerman Province, Iran. At the 2006 census, its population was 69, in 12 families.
