= Bonkal =

Bonkal بن كل
- Village
- Location within Iran
- Coordinates: 28°01′38″N 59°05′33″E
- Country: Iran
- Province: Kerman
- County: Rigan
- Bakhsh: Central
- Rural District: Gavkan

Population (2006)
  - Total: 20
- Time zone: UTC+3:30 (IRST)
  - Summer (DST): UTC+4:30 (IRDT)

Bonkal (Persian: بن كل) is a village in Gavkan Rural District, in the Central District of Rigan County, Kerman Province, Iran. At the 2006 census, its population was 20, in 4 families.
