= Chah Qanbar =

Chah Qanbar چاه قنبر
- Village
- Location within Iran
- Coordinates: 28°14′55″N 59°04′19″E
- Country: Iran
- Province: Kerman
- County: Rigan
- Bakhsh: Central
- Rural District: Gavkan

Population (2006)
  - Total: 111
- Time zone: UTC+3:30 (IRST)
  - Summer (DST): UTC+4:30 (IRDT)

Chah Qanbar (Persian: چاه قنبر, also Romanized as Chāh Qanbar) is a village in Gavkan Rural District, in the Central District of Rigan County, Kerman Province, Iran. At the 2006 census, its population was 111, in 21 families.
