= Sharikabad, Rigan =

Sharikabad شريك اباد
- Village
- Location within Iran
- Coordinates: 28°39′40″N 58°59′31″E
- Country: Iran
- Province: Kerman
- County: Rigan
- Bakhsh: Central
- Rural District: Rigan

Population (2006)
  - Total: 620
- Time zone: UTC+3:30 (IRST)
  - Summer (DST): UTC+4:30 (IRDT)

Sharikabad (Persian: شريك اباد, also Romanized as Sharīkābād; also known as Sharīkābād-e Rīgān and Sharīkābād Rīgān) is a village in Rigan Rural District, in the Central District of Rigan County, Kerman Province, Iran. At the 2006 census, its population was 620, in 146 families.
