= Sorkh Kuh =

Sorkh Kuh (Persian: سرخ كوه) may refer to:

- Sorkh Kuh, Hormozgan
- Sorkh Kuh, Kerman
- Sorkh Kuh, South Khorasan
