= Rahmatabad, Rigan =

City in Kerman province, Iran

Rahmatabad Persian: رحمت‌آباد
- City
- Location within Iran
- Coordinates: 28°38′36″N 59°03′35″E
- Country: Iran
- Province: Kerman
- County: Rigan
- District: Rahmatabad

Population (2016)
  - Total: 5,055
- Time zone: UTC+3:30 (IRST)

Rahmatabad (Persian: رحمت‌آباد) (Note: Also romanized as Raḥmatābād; also known as Raḥmatābād-e Rīgān) is a city in, and the capital of, Rahmatabad District of Rigan County, Kerman province, Iran.

== Demographics ==
=== Population ===
At the time of the 2006 National Census, Rahmatabad's population was 3,615 in 737 households, when it was a village in Rigan Rural District of the former Rigan District of Bam County. The following census in 2011 counted 4,731 people in 1,103 households, by which time the district had been separated from the county in the establishment of Rigan County. The rural district was transferred to the new Central District. The 2016 census measured the population of the village as 5,055 people in 1,307 households.

Rahmatabad was elevated to the status of a city in 2019, and in 2023, the city and the rural district were separated from the district in the establishment of Rahmatabad District.
