= Gazan Khvast =

Gazan Khvast گزان خواست
- Village
- Location within Iran
- Coordinates: 28°36′37″N 59°02′23″E
- Country: Iran
- Province: Kerman
- County: Rigan
- Bakhsh: Central
- Rural District: Rigan

Population (2006)
  - Total: 546
- Time zone: UTC+3:30 (IRST)
  - Summer (DST): UTC+4:30 (IRDT)

Gazan Khvast (Persian: گزان خواست, also Romanized as Gazān Khvāst; also known as Gazān Khodāst, Jazānkhāş, and Jazān Khvāş) is a village in Rigan Rural District, in the Central District of Rigan County, Kerman Province, Iran. At the 2006 census, its population was 546, in 111 families.
