= Hojjati =

Hojjati حجتي
- Village
- Interactive map of Hojjati
- Country: Iran
- Province: Kerman
- County: Rigan
- Bakhsh: Central
- Rural District: Rigan

Population (2006)
  - Total: 28
- Time zone: UTC+3:30 (IRST)
  - Summer (DST): UTC+4:30 (IRDT)

Hojjati (Persian: حجتي, also Romanized as Ḩojjatī) is a village in Rigan Rural District, in the Central District of Rigan County, Kerman Province, Iran. At the 2006 census, its population was 28, in 5 families.
