= Geranak =

Geranak گرانك
- Village
- Location within Iran
- Coordinates: 28°10′31″N 58°40′39″E
- Country: Iran
- Province: Kerman
- County: Rigan
- Bakhsh: Central
- Rural District: Gavkan

Population (2006)
  - Total: 46
- Time zone: UTC+3:30 (IRST)
  - Summer (DST): UTC+4:30 (IRDT)

Geranak (Persian: گرانك, also Romanized as Gerānak) is a village in Gavkan Rural District, in the Central District of Rigan County, Kerman Province, Iran. At the 2006 census, its population was 46, in 10 families.
