= Zaftek Sargdar =

Zaftek Sargdar زفتك سرگدار
- Village
- Country: Iran
- Province: Kerman
- County: Rigan
- Bakhsh: Central
- Rural District: Gavkan

Population (2006)
  - Total: 139
- Time zone: UTC+3:30 (IRST)
  - Summer (DST): UTC+4:30 (IRDT)

Zaftek Sargdar (Persian: زفتك سرگدار, also Romanized as Zaftek Sargdār) is a village in Gavkan Rural District, in the Central District of Rigan County, Kerman Province, Iran. At the 2006 census, its population was 139, in 24 families.
