= Tahrud, Kerman =

Tahrud تهرود
- Village
- Location within Iran
- Coordinates: 28°41′24″N 59°03′35″E
- Country: Iran
- Province: Kerman
- County: Rigan
- Bakhsh: Central
- Rural District: Rigan

Population (2006)
  - Total: 901
- Time zone: UTC+3:30 (IRST)
  - Summer (DST): UTC+4:30 (IRDT)

Tahrud (Persian: تهرود, also Romanized as Tahrūd and Tahrood) is a village in Rigan Rural District, in the Central District of Rigan County, Kerman Province, Iran. At the 2006 census, its population was 901, in 228 families.
