= Shahdad Shahiki =

Shahdad Shahiki شهدادشهيکي
- Village
- Country: Iran
- Province: Kerman
- County: Rigan
- Bakhsh: Central
- Rural District: Rigan

Population (2006)
  - Total: 52
- Time zone: UTC+3:30 (IRST)
  - Summer (DST): UTC+4:30 (IRDT)

Shahdad Shahiki (Persian: شهدادشهيکي, also Romanized as Shahdād Shahīkī) is a village in Rigan Rural District, in the Central District of Rigan County, Kerman Province, Iran. At the 2006 census, its population was 52, in 13 families.
