= Deh-e Nab Khush =

Deh-e Nab Khush ده ناب خوش
- Village
- Country: Iran
- Province: Kerman
- County: Rigan
- Bakhsh: Central
- Rural District: Gavkan

Population (2006)
  - Total: 26
- Time zone: UTC+3:30 (IRST)
  - Summer (DST): UTC+4:30 (IRDT)

Deh-e Nab Khush (Persian: ده ناب خوش, also Romanized as Deh-e Nāb Khūsh) is a village in Gavkan Rural District, in the Central District of Rigan County, Kerman Province, Iran. At the 2006 census, its population was 26, in 6 families.
