= Cheh Gol Shirkhan =

Cheh Gol Shirkhan چه گل شيرخان
- Village
- Country: Iran
- Province: Kerman
- County: Rigan
- Bakhsh: Central
- Rural District: Gavkan

Population (2006)
  - Total: 86
- Time zone: UTC+3:30 (IRST)
  - Summer (DST): UTC+4:30 (IRDT)

Cheh Gol Shirkhan (Persian: چه گل شيرخان, also Romanized as Cheh Gol Shīrkhān) is a village in Gavkan Rural District, in the Central District of Rigan County, Kerman Province, Iran. At the 2006 census, its population was 86, in 15 families.
