= Bog-e Sagilan =

Bog-e Sagilan بگ سگيلان
- Village
- Location within Iran
- Coordinates: 28°27′40″N 58°32′57″E
- Country: Iran
- Province: Kerman
- County: Rigan
- Bakhsh: Central
- Rural District: Gavkan

Population (2006)
  - Total: 47
- Time zone: UTC+3:30 (IRST)
  - Summer (DST): UTC+4:30 (IRDT)

Bog-e Sagilan (Persian: بگ سگيلان, also Romanized as Bog-e Sagīlān; also known as Bog-e Sehgīlān) is a village in Gavkan Rural District, in the Central District of Rigan County, Kerman Province, Iran. At the 2006 census, its population was 47, in 9 families.
