= Ziaratgah-e Pir Almas =

Ziaratgah-e Pir Almas زيارتگاه پيرالماس
- Village
- Location within Iran
- Coordinates: 28°44′16″N 58°52′02″E
- Country: Iran
- Province: Kerman
- County: Rigan
- Bakhsh: Gonbaki
- Rural District: Gonbaki

Population (2006)
  - Total: 35
- Time zone: UTC+3:30 (IRST)
  - Summer (DST): UTC+4:30 (IRDT)

Ziaratgah-e Pir Almas (Persian: زيارتگاه پيرالماس, also Romanized as Zīāratgāh-e Pīr Almās; also known as Pīr Almās and Por Almās) is a village in Gonbaki Rural District, Gonbaki District, Rigan County, Kerman Province, Iran. At the 2006 census, its population was 35, in 7 families.
