= Hemmatabad-e Vahab =

Hemmatabad-e Vahab همت ابادواهب
- Village
- Country: Iran
- Province: Kerman
- County: Rigan
- Bakhsh: Gonbaki
- Rural District: Gonbaki

Population (2006)
  - Total: 32
- Time zone: UTC+3:30 (IRST)
  - Summer (DST): UTC+4:30 (IRDT)

Hemmatabad-e Vahab (Persian: همت ابادواهب, also Romanized as Hemmatābād-e Vāhab) is a village in Gonbaki Rural District, Gonbaki District, Rigan County, Kerman Province, Iran. At the 2006 census, its population was 32, in 9 families.
