= Salmanabad, Rigan =

Salmanabad سلمان اباد
- Village
- Location within Iran
- Coordinates: 28°44′44″N 58°50′21″E
- Country: Iran
- Province: Kerman
- County: Rigan
- Bakhsh: Gonbaki
- Rural District: Gonbaki

Population (2006)
  - Total: 194
- Time zone: UTC+3:30 (IRST)
  - Summer (DST): UTC+4:30 (IRDT)

Salmanabad (Persian: سلمان اباد, also Romanized as Salmānābād; also known as Salmānābād-e Gonbagī) is a village in Gonbaki Rural District, Gonbaki District, Rigan County, Kerman Province, Iran. At the 2006 census, its population was 194, in 51 families.
