= Ziyarat Boneh =

Ziyarat Boneh زيارت بنه
- Village
- Country: Iran
- Province: Kerman
- County: Rigan
- Bakhsh: Central
- Rural District: Gavkan

Population (2006)
  - Total: 24
- Time zone: UTC+3:30 (IRST)
  - Summer (DST): UTC+4:30 (IRDT)

Ziyarat Boneh (Persian: زيارت بنه, also Romanized as Zīyārat Boneh; also known as Zenāghī (Persian: زناغي)) is a village in Gavkan Rural District, in the Central District of Rigan County, Kerman Province, Iran. At the 2006 census, its population was 24, in 4 families.
