= Sorkh-e Kan, Rigan =

Sorkh-e Kan سرخكان
- Village
- Country: Iran
- Province: Kerman
- County: Rigan
- Bakhsh: Central
- Rural District: Gavkan

Population (2006)
  - Total: 69
- Time zone: UTC+3:30 (IRST)
  - Summer (DST): UTC+4:30 (IRDT)

Sorkh-e Kan (Persian: سرخكان, also Romanized as Sorkh-e Kān) is a village in Gavkan Rural District, in the Central District of Rigan County, Kerman Province, Iran. At the 2006 census, its population was 69, in 14 families.
