= Hemmatabad-e Gol Mohammad =

Hemmatabad-e Gol Mohammad همت‌آباد گل‌محمد
- Village
- Location within Iran
- Coordinates: 28°46′03″N 58°51′10″E
- Country: Iran
- Province: Kerman
- County: Rigan
- Bakhsh: Central
- Rural District: Rigan

Population (2006)
  - Total: 80
- Time zone: UTC+3:30 (IRST)
  - Summer (DST): UTC+4:30 (IRDT)

Hemmatabad-e Gol Mohammad (Persian: همت‌آباد گل‌محمد, also Romanized as Hemmatābād-e Gol Moḩammad; also known as Hemmatābād) is a village in Rigan Rural District, in the Central District of Rigan County, Kerman Province, Iran. At the 2006 census, its population was 80, in 13 families.
