= Mehdiabad-e Olya =

Mehdiabad-e Olya (Persian: مهدي اباداوليا) may refer to:

- Mehdiabad-e Olya, Kerman
- Mehdiabad-e Olya, Kermanshah
