= Hemmatabad-e Chah-e Malek =

Hemmatabad-e Chah-e Malek همت ابادچاه ملك
- Village
- Location within Iran
- Coordinates: 28°35′38″N 59°08′34″E
- Country: Iran
- Province: Kerman
- County: Rigan
- Bakhsh: Central
- Rural District: Rigan

Population (2006)
  - Total: 196
- Time zone: UTC+3:30 (IRST)
  - Summer (DST): UTC+4:30 (IRDT)

Hemmatabad-e Chah-e Malek (Persian: همت ابادچاه ملك, also Romanized as Hemmatābād-e Chāh Malek; also known as Hemmatābād-e Mashā) is a village in Rigan Rural District, in the Central District of Rigan County, Kerman Province, Iran. At the 2006 census, its population was 196, in 44 families.
