= Mehdiabad-e Olya, Kerman =

Village in Kerman province, Iran

Mehdiabad-e Olya Persian: مهدي اباد اوليا
- Village
- Location within Iran
- Coordinates: 28°46′02″N 59°02′49″E
- Country: Iran
- Province: Kerman
- County: Gonbaki
- District: Naseriyeh
- Rural District: Naseriyeh

Population (2016)
  - Total: Below reporting threshold
- Time zone: UTC+3:30 (IRST)

Mehdiabad-e Olya (Persian: مهدي اباد اوليا) (Note: Also romanized as Mehdīābād-e ‘Olyā; also known as Mahdīābād-e ‘Olyā) is a village in, and the capital of, Naseriyeh Rural District of Naseriyeh District, Gonbaki County, Kerman province, Iran. The previous capital of the rural district was the village of Naseriyeh.

== Demographics ==
=== Population ===
At the time of the 2006 National Census, the village's population was 298 in 65 households, when it was in Chahdegal Rural District of the former Rigan District of Bam County. The following census in 2011 counted 370 people in 100 households, by which time the rural district had been separated from the county in the establishment of Fahraj County. The village was transferred to Negin Kavir Rural District created in the new Negin Kavir District. The 2016 census measured the population of the village as below the reporting threshold.

In 2023, the village was separated from the county in the establishment of Gonbaki County and transferred to Naseriyeh Rural District created in the new Naseriyeh District.
