= Ziarat Rural District (Gonbaki County) =

Rural district in Kerman province, Iran

Ziarat Rural District Persian: دهستان زیارت
- Rural District
- Location within Iran
- Coordinates: 28°21′04″N 58°36′47″E
- Country: Iran
- Province: Kerman
- County: Gonbaki
- District: Central
- Capital: Ziyarat Shah
- Time zone: UTC+3:30 (IRST)

Ziarat Rural District (Persian: دهستان زیارت) is in the Central District (Note: Formerly Gonbaki District of Rigan County) of Gonbaki County, Kerman province, Iran. Its capital is the village of Ziyarat Shah, whose population at the time of the 2016 National Census was 425 in 126 households.

== History ==
After the 2006 census, Rigan District was separated from Bam County in the establishment of Rigan County, which was divided into two districts of two rural districts each, with the city of Mohammadabad as its capital and only city at the time.

In 2023, Gonbaki District (Note: Renamed the Central District of Gonbaki County) was separated from the county in the establishment of Gonbaki County and renamed the Central District, and Ziarat Rural District was created in the district.
