= Sarneran =

Sarneran سرنران
- Village
- Country: Iran
- Province: Kerman
- County: Rigan
- Bakhsh: Central
- Rural District: Gavkan

Population (2006)
  - Total: 146
- Time zone: UTC+3:30 (IRST)
  - Summer (DST): UTC+4:30 (IRDT)

Sarneran (Persian: سرنران, also Romanized as Sarnerān; also known as Sorkh-e Kān (Persian: سرخکان)) is a village in Gavkan Rural District, in the Central District of Rigan County, Kerman Province, Iran. At the 2006 census, its population was 146, in 25 families.
