= Posht-e Rig Rural District =

Rural district in Kerman province, Iran

Posht-e Rig Rural District Persian: دهستان پشت ریگ
- Rural District
- Location within Iran
- Coordinates: 28°43′22″N 59°06′18″E
- Country: Iran
- Province: Kerman
- County: Rigan
- District: Central
- Capital: Aliabad-e Posht-e Rig
- Time zone: UTC+3:30 (IRST)

Posht-e Rig Rural District (Persian: دهستان پشت ریگ) is in the Central District of Rigan County, Kerman province, Iran. Its capital is the village of Aliabad-e Posht-e Rig, whose population at the time of the 2016 National Census was 1,379 in 359 households.

== History ==
After the 2006 census, Rigan District was separated from Bam County in the establishment of Rigan County, which was divided into two districts of two rural districts each, with Mohammadabad as its capital and only city at the time. Posht-e Rig Rural District was established in the Central District in 2023.
