= Ziyaret =

Ziyaret is a Turkish, Persian and Urdu word of Arabic origin [زيارة], meaning "visit." It may refer to the following places in Turkey:

- Ziyaret, Altınözü, a neighbourhood in the district of Altınözü, Hatay Province
- Ziyaret, Amasya, a town in the district of Amasya, Amasya Province
- Ziyaret, Kahta, a village in the district of Kahta, Adıyaman Province
- Ziyaret, Kozluk, a village in the district of Kozluk, Batman Province
- Ziyaretköy, Kurucaşile, a village in the district of Kurucaşile, Bartın Province
- Ziyaret, Şavşat, a village in the district of Şavşat, Artvin Province
- Ziyaret, Ergani
- Ziyaret, Sur
- Ziyaret Tepe, the modern location of Tushhan, an Assyrian city.

== See also ==
- Ziarat (disambiguation), the original Persian word
