= Abbasabad-e Sardar =

City in Kerman province, Iran

Abbasabad-e Sardar Persian: عباس اباد سردار
- City
- Location within Iran
- Coordinates: 28°40′53″N 59°04′34″E
- Country: Iran
- Province: Kerman
- County: Rigan
- District: Central

Population (2016)
  - Total: 5,125
- Time zone: UTC+3:30 (IRST)

Abbasabad-e Sardar (Persian: عباس ابادسردار) (Note: Also romanized as Abbāsābād-e Sardār; also known as ‘Abbāsābād) is a city in the Central District of Rigan County, Kerman province, Iran.

== Demographics ==
=== Population ===
At the time of the 2006 National Census, Abbasabad-e Sardar's population was 2,324 in 527 households, when it was a village in Rigan Rural District of the former Rigan District of Bam County. The following census in 2011 counted 4,338 people in 1,151 households, by which time the district had been separated from the county in the establishment of Rigan County. The rural district was transferred to the new Central District. The 2016 census measured the population of the village as 5,125 people in 1,546 households. It was the most populous village in its rural district.

In 2019, Abbasabad-e Sardar was elevated to the status of a city.
