= Hemmatabad-e Olya =

Hemmatabad-e Olya or Hemmat Abad Olya (Persian: همت ابادعليا), also known as Hemmatabad-e Bala - all meaning "Upper Hemmatabad", may refer to:

- Hemmatabad-e Olya, Kerman
- Hemmatabad-e Olya, Rafsanjan, Kerman Province
- Hemmatabad-e Olya, Lorestan
