= Naseriyeh District =

District in Kerman province, Iran

Naseriyeh District Persian: بخش ناصریه
- District
- Location within Iran
- Coordinates: 28°29′N 58°48′E
- Country: Iran
- Province: Kerman
- County: Gonbaki
- Capital: Naseriyeh
- Time zone: UTC+3:30 (IRST)

Naseriyeh District (Persian: بخش ناصریه) is in Gonbaki County, Kerman province, Iran. Its capital is the village of Naseriyeh, whose population at the time of the 2016 National Census was 588 people in 164 households.

== History ==
After the 2006 census, Rigan District was separated from Bam County in the establishment of Rigan County, which was divided into two districts of two rural districts each, with Mohammadabad as its capital and only city at the time.

In 2023, Gonbaki District (Note: Renamed the Central District of Gonbaki County) was separated from the county in the establishment of Gonbaki County and renamed the Central District. The new county was divided into two districts of two rural districts each, with Gonbaki as its capital and only city at the time.

=== Administrative divisions ===
Naseriyeh District
Administrative Divisions
Kahur Khoshk RD
Naseriyeh RD
RD = Rural District
