= Ziarat Rural District =

Ziarat Rural District (Persian: دهستان زيارت) may refer to:

- Ziarat Rural District (Dashtestan County), Bushehr province
- Ziarat Rural District (Gonbaki County), Kerman province
- Ziarat Rural District (Shirvan County), North Khorasan province
