= Rahmatabad District (Rigan County) =

District in Kerman province, Iran

Rahmatabad District Persian: بخش رحمت‌آباد
- District
- Location within Iran
- Coordinates: 28°16′N 59°14′E
- Country: Iran
- Province: Kerman
- County: Rigan
- Capital: Rahmatabad
- Time zone: UTC+3:30 (IRST)

Rahmatabad District (Persian: بخش رحمت‌آباد) is in Rigan County, Kerman province, Iran. Its capital is the city of Rahmatabad, whose population at the time of the 2016 National Census was 5,055 in 1,307 households.

== History ==
After the 2006 census, Rigan District was separated from Bam County in the establishment of Rigan County, which was divided into two districts of two rural districts each, with Mohammadabad as its capital and only city at the time.

In 2019, the village of Rahmatabad was elevated to the status of a city. In 2023, Gavkan Rural District was separated from the Central District in the formation of Rahmatabad District.

== Demographics ==
=== Administrative divisions ===
Rahmatabad District
Administrative Divisions
Gavkan RD
Sadabad RD
Rahmatabad (city)
RD = Rural District
