= Ziarat, Bandar Abbas =

Ziarat زيارت
- Village
- Location within Iran
- Coordinates: 27°47′23″N 56°05′20″E
- Country: Iran
- Province: Hormozgan
- County: Bandar Abbas
- Bakhsh: Fin
- Rural District: Gohreh

Population (2006)
  - Total: 141
- Time zone: UTC+3:30 (IRST)
  - Summer (DST): UTC+4:30 (IRDT)

Ziarat (Persian: زيارت, also Romanized as Zīārat, Zeyārat, and Zīyārat) is a village in Gohreh Rural District, Fin District, Bandar Abbas County, Hormozgan Province, Iran. At the 2006 census, its population was 141, in 28 families.
