= Naseriyeh, Sirjan =

Naseriyeh ناصريه
- Village
- Location within Iran
- Coordinates: 29°26′36″N 55°30′48″E
- Country: Iran
- Province: Kerman
- County: Sirjan
- Bakhsh: Central
- Rural District: Sharifabad

Population (2006)
  - Total: 41
- Time zone: UTC+3:30 (IRST)
  - Summer (DST): UTC+4:30 (IRDT)

Naseriyeh (Persian: ناصريه, also Romanized as Nāşerīyeh; also known as Nāşerīyeh-e Kaffeh) is a village in Sharifabad Rural District, in the Central District of Sirjan County, Kerman Province, Iran. At the 2006 census, its population was 41, in 10 families.
