= Naseriyeh Rural District =

Rural district in Kerman province, Iran

Naseriyeh Rural District Persian: دهستان ناصریه
- Rural District
- Location within Iran
- Coordinates: 28°46′02″N 59°02′49″E
- Country: Iran
- Province: Kerman
- County: Gonbaki
- District: Naseriyeh
- Capital: Mehdiabad-e Olya

Population (2016)
  - Total: 14,181
- Time zone: UTC+3:30 (IRST)

Naseriyeh Rural District (Persian: دهستان ناصریه) is in Naseriyeh District of Gonbaki County, Kerman province, Iran. Its capital is the village of Mehdiabad-e Olya. The rural district's previous capital was the village of Naseriyeh.

== History ==
After the 2006 census, Rigan District was separated from Bam County in the establishment of Rigan County, which was divided into two districts of two rural districts each, with Mohammadabad as its capital and only city at the time. Naseriyeh Rural District was created in the new Gonbaki District. (Note: Renamed the Central District of Gonbaki County)

== Demographics ==
=== Population ===
At the time of the 2011 census, the rural district's population was 12,395 in 3,327 households. The 2016 census measured the population of the rural district as 14,181 in 4,210 households. The most populous of its 98 villages was Aliabad-e Mohammad Qasem Khan, with 1,196 people.

In 2023, the district was separated from the county in the establishment of Gonbaki County and renamed the Central District, and the rural district was transferred to the new Naseriyeh District.
