= Naseriyeh-ye Bala =

Naseriyeh-ye Bala ناصريه بالا
- Village
- Location within Iran
- Coordinates: 30°19′21″N 56°09′51″E
- Country: Iran
- Province: Kerman
- County: Rafsanjan
- Bakhsh: Central
- Rural District: Kabutar Khan

Population (2006)
  - Total: 839
- Time zone: UTC+3:30 (IRST)
  - Summer (DST): UTC+4:30 (IRDT)

Naseriyeh-ye Bala (Persian: ناصريه بالا, also Romanized as Nāşerīyeh-ye Bālā; also known as Nāşerīyeh and Nāsirīyeh) is a village in Kabutar Khan Rural District, in the Central District of Rafsanjan County, Kerman Province, Iran. At the 2006 census, its population was 839, in 184 families.
