= Ziarat Mowla =

Ziarat Mowla زيارت مولا
- Village
- Location within Iran
- Coordinates: 27°20′32″N 56°55′11″E
- Country: Iran
- Province: Hormozgan
- County: Minab
- Bakhsh: Central
- Rural District: Gurband

Population (2006)
  - Total: 269
- Time zone: UTC+3:30 (IRST)
  - Summer (DST): UTC+4:30 (IRDT)

Ziarat Mowla (Persian: زيارت مولا, also Romanized as Zīārat Mowlá; also known as Khar Bandān and Kharbandavān) is a village in Gurband Rural District, in the Central District of Minab County, Hormozgan Province, Iran. At the 2006 census, its population was 269, in 50 families.
