= Ziarat, Bandar Lengeh =

Ziarat زيارت
- Village
- Location within Iran
- Coordinates: 26°43′28″N 54°59′59″E
- Country: Iran
- Province: Hormozgan
- County: Bandar Lengeh
- Bakhsh: Central
- Rural District: Howmeh

Population (2006)
  - Total: 174
- Time zone: UTC+3:30 (IRST)
  - Summer (DST): UTC+4:30 (IRDT)

Ziarat (Persian: زيارت, also Romanized as Zīārat, Zeyārat, and Zīyārat) is a village in Howmeh Rural District, in the Central District of Bandar Lengeh County, Hormozgan Province, Iran. At the 2006 census, its population was 174, in 30 families.
