= Hemmatabad-e Chalaki =

Hemmatabad-e Chalaki همت‌آباد چالاکی
- Village
- Country: Iran
- Province: Razavi Khorasan
- County: Quchan
- Bakhsh: Central
- Rural District: Shirin Darreh

Population (2006)
  - Total: 130
- Time zone: UTC+3:30 (IRST)
  - Summer (DST): UTC+4:30 (IRDT)

Hemmatabad-e Chalaki (Persian: همت‌آباد چالاکی, also Romanized as Hemmatābād-e Chālāḵī) is a village in Shirin Darreh Rural District, in the Central District of Quchan County, Razavi Khorasan Province, Iran. At the 2006 census, its population was 130, in 41 families.
