= Hemmatabad, Kenevist =

Hemmatabad همت اباد
- Village
- Location within Iran
- Coordinates: 36°21′17″N 59°39′44″E
- Country: Iran
- Province: Razavi Khorasan
- County: Mashhad
- Bakhsh: Central

Population (2006)
  - Total: 25,000
- Time zone: UTC+3:30 (IRST)
  - Summer (DST): UTC+4:30 (IRDT)

Hemmatabad (Persian: همت اباد, also Romanized as Hemmatābād) is a village in the Central District of Mashhad County, Razavi Khorasan Province, Iran.In 2015, its population was about 25,000
