= Salmanabad, Anbarabad =

Salmanabad سلمان اباد
- Village
- Location within Iran
- Coordinates: 28°20′36″N 57°47′21″E
- Country: Iran
- Province: Kerman
- County: Anbarabad
- Bakhsh: Central
- Rural District: Jahadabad

Population (2006)
  - Total: 348
- Time zone: UTC+3:30 (IRST)
  - Summer (DST): UTC+4:30 (IRDT)

Salmanabad (Persian: سلمان اباد, also Romanized as Salmānābād; also known as Salmānābād-e Pā’īn) is a village in Jahadabad Rural District, in the Central District of Anbarabad County, Kerman Province, Iran. At the 2006 census, its population was 348, consisting of 69 families.
