= Hemmatabad-e Agah =

Hemmatabad-e Agah همت اباداگاه
- Village
- Location within Iran
- Coordinates: 30°26′21″N 55°49′49″E
- Country: Iran
- Province: Kerman
- County: Rafsanjan
- Bakhsh: Central
- Rural District: Eslamiyeh

Population (2006)
  - Total: 2,046
- Time zone: UTC+3:30 (IRST)
  - Summer (DST): UTC+4:30 (IRDT)

Hemmatabad-e Agah (Persian: همت اباداگاه, also Romanized as Hemmatābād-e Āgāh; also known as Hemmatābād) is a village in Eslamiyeh Rural District, in the Central District of Rafsanjan County, Kerman Province, Iran. At the 2006 census, its population was 2,046, in 497 families.
