= Hemmatabad, Khusf =

Hemmatabad همت اباد
- Village
- Location within Iran
- Coordinates: 31°58′51″N 59°05′31″E
- Country: Iran
- Province: South Khorasan
- County: Khusf
- Bakhsh: Jolgeh-e Mazhan
- Rural District: Qaleh Zari

Population (2006)
  - Total: 18
- Time zone: UTC+3:30 (IRST)
  - Summer (DST): UTC+4:30 (IRDT)

Hemmatabad (Persian: همت اباد, also Romanized as Hemmatābād) is a village in Qaleh Zari Rural District, Jolgeh-e Mazhan District, Khusf County, South Khorasan Province, Iran. At the 2006 census, its population was 18, in 5 families.
