= Ziaratgah, Gilan =

Ziaratgah زيارتگاه
- Village
- Country: Iran
- Province: Gilan
- County: Siahkal
- Bakhsh: Central
- Rural District: Malfejan

Population (2006)
  - Total: 236
- Time zone: UTC+3:30 (IRST)

Ziaratgah (Persian: زيارتگاه, also Romanized as Zīāratgāh) is a village in Malfejan Rural District, in the Central District of Siahkal County, Gilan Province, Iran. At the 2016 census, its population was 200, in 72 families. Down from 236 in 2006.
