= Hemmatabad, Maraveh Tappeh =

Hemmatabad همت اباد
- Village
- Location within Iran
- Coordinates: 37°53′52″N 55°43′20″E
- Country: Iran
- Province: Golestan
- County: Maraveh Tappeh
- Bakhsh: Central
- Rural District: Maraveh Tappeh

Population (2006)
  - Total: 167
- Time zone: UTC+3:30 (IRST)
  - Summer (DST): UTC+4:30 (IRDT)

Hemmatabad (Persian: همت اباد, also Romanized as Hemmatābād; also known as Hemmatābād-e Marāveh) is a village in Maraveh Tappeh Rural District, in the Central District of Maraveh Tappeh County, Golestan Province, Iran. At the 2006 census, its population was 167, in 32 families.
