= Ziarat-e Seyyed Soleyman =

Ziarat-e Seyyed Soleyman زيارت سيدسليمان
- Village
- Location within Iran
- Coordinates: 27°27′17″N 56°37′31″E
- Country: Iran
- Province: Hormozgan
- County: Bandar Abbas
- Bakhsh: Takht
- Rural District: Takht

Population (2006)
  - Total: 806
- Time zone: UTC+3:30 (IRST)
  - Summer (DST): UTC+4:30 (IRDT)

Ziarat-e Seyyed Soleyman (Persian: زيارت سيدسليمان, also Romanize as Zīārat-e Seyyed Soleymān; also known as Zeyārat, Zīārat, and Zīyārat) is a village in Takht Rural District, Takht District, Bandar Abbas County, Hormozgan Province, Iran. At the 2006 census, its population was 806, in 182 families.
