= Mehdiabad-e Olya, Kermanshah =

Village in Kermanshah, Iran

Mehdiabad-e Olya مهدي ابادعليا
- Village
- Location within Iran
- Coordinates: 34°04′27″N 47°12′23″E
- Country: Iran
- Province: Kermanshah
- County: Kermanshah
- Bakhsh: Firuzabad
- Rural District: Sar Firuzabad

Population (2006)
  - Total: 106
- Time zone: UTC+3:30 (IRST)
  - Summer (DST): UTC+4:30 (IRDT)

Mehdiabad-e Olya (Persian: مهدي ابادعليا, also Romanized as Mehdīābād-e ‘Olyā) is a village in Sar Firuzabad Rural District, Firuzabad District, Kermanshah County, Kermanshah Province, Iran. At the 2006 census, its population counted 106 members, across 21 families.
