= Ziarat-e Pakuh =

Ziarat-e Pakuh زيارت پاكوه
- Village
- Location within Iran
- Coordinates: 27°47′46″N 56°27′31″E
- Country: Iran
- Province: Hormozgan
- County: Bandar Abbas
- Bakhsh: Fin
- Rural District: Siyahu

Population (2006)
  - Total: 41
- Time zone: UTC+3:30 (IRST)
  - Summer (DST): UTC+4:30 (IRDT)

Ziarat-e Pakuh (Persian: زيارت پاكوه, also Romanized as Zīārat-e Pākūh; also known as Zīyārat-e Pākūh) is a village in Siyahu Rural District, Fin District, Bandar Abbas County, Hormozgan Province, Iran. At the 2006 census, its population was 41, in 10 families.
