= Ziarat, Nishapur =

Ziarat زيارت
- Village
- Location within Iran
- Coordinates: 36°42′58″N 58°32′52″E
- Country: Iran
- Province: Razavi Khorasan
- County: Nishapur
- Bakhsh: Sarvelayat
- Rural District: Sarvelayat

Population (2006)
  - Total: 82
- Time zone: UTC+3:30 (IRST)
  - Summer (DST): UTC+4:30 (IRDT)

Ziarat (Persian: زيارت, also Romanized as Zīārat and Zeyārat) is a village in Sarvelayat Rural District, Sarvelayat District, Nishapur County, Razavi Khorasan Province, Iran. At the 2006 census, its population was 82, in 20 families.
