= Vakilabad, Baft =

Vakilabad وکیل‌آباد
- Village
- Location within Iran
- Coordinates: 28°59′57″N 56°28′42″E
- Country: Iran
- Province: Kerman
- County: Baft
- Bakhsh: Central
- Rural District: Dashtab

Population (2006)
  - Total: 417
- Time zone: UTC+3:30 (IRST)
  - Summer (DST): UTC+4:30 (IRDT)

Vakilabad (Persian: وکیل‌آباد, also Romanized as Vakīlābād) is a village in Dashtab Rural District, in the Central District of Baft County, Kerman Province, Iran. At the 2006 census, its population was 417, in 100 families.
