= Ziarat-e Kot-e Gorg =

Ziarat-e Kot-e Gorg زيارت كت گرگ
- Village
- Location within Iran
- Coordinates: 28°32′00″N 57°51′00″E
- Country: Iran
- Province: Kerman
- County: Anbarabad
- Bakhsh: Central
- Rural District: Mohammadabad

Population (2006)
  - Total: 414
- Time zone: UTC+3:30 (IRST)
  - Summer (DST): UTC+4:30 (IRDT)

Ziarat-e Kot-e Gorg (Persian: زيارت كت گرگ, also Romanized as Zīārat-e Kot-e Gorg) is a small village in The Mohammadabad Rural District, in the Central District of Anbarabad County, Kerman Province, Iran. At the 2006 census, its population was 414, in 85 families.
