= Aliabad, Kharanaq =

Aliabad علی‌آباد
- Village
- Location within Iran
- Coordinates: 33°00′04″N 55°32′53″E
- Country: Iran
- Province: Yazd
- County: Ardakan
- Bakhsh: Kharanaq
- Rural District: Rabatat

Population (2006)
  - Total: 10
- Time zone: UTC+3:30 (IRST)
  - Summer (DST): UTC+4:30 (IRDT)

Aliabad (Persian: علی‌آباد, also Romanized as ‘Alīābād; also known as Hemmatābād) is a village in Rabatat Rural District, Kharanaq District, Ardakan County, Yazd Province, Iran. At the 2006 census, its population was 10, in 5 families.
