= Ziarat-e Hezart Abbas =

Ziarat-e Hezart Abbas زيارت حضرت عباس
- Village
- Country: Iran
- Province: Kerman
- County: Jiroft
- Bakhsh: Central
- Rural District: Esfandaqeh

Population (2006)
  - Total: 37
- Time zone: UTC+3:30 (IRST)
  - Summer (DST): UTC+4:30 (IRDT)

Ziarat-e Hezart Abbas (Persian: زيارت حضرت عباس, also Romanized as Zīārat-e Hez̤art ʿAbbās) is a village in Esfandaqeh Rural District, in the Central District of Jiroft County, Kerman Province, Iran. At the 2006 census, its population was 37, in 9 families.
