= Ziarat-e Pir Karkan =

Ziarat-e Pir Karkan زيارت پير کرکان
- Village
- Location within Iran
- Coordinates: 27°11′35″N 58°32′27″E
- Country: Iran
- Province: Kerman
- County: Qaleh Ganj
- Bakhsh: Chah Dadkhoda
- Rural District: Chah Dadkhoda

Population (2006)
  - Total: 324
- Time zone: UTC+3:30 (IRST)
  - Summer (DST): UTC+4:30 (IRDT)

Ziarat-e Pir Karkan (Persian: زيارت پير کرکان, also Romanized as Zīārat-e Pīr Karkān; also known as Zīārat) is a village in Chah Dadkhoda Rural District, Chah Dadkhoda District, Qaleh Ganj County, Kerman Province, Iran. At the 2006 census, its population was 324, in 74 families.
