= Sorkh-e Kan, Anbarabad =

Sorkh-e Kan سرخكان
- Village
- Location within Iran
- Coordinates: 28°29′05″N 58°09′09″E
- Country: Iran
- Province: Kerman
- County: Anbarabad
- Bakhsh: Jebalbarez-e Jonubi
- Rural District: Garmsar

Population (2006)
  - Total: 135
- Time zone: UTC+3:30 (IRST)
  - Summer (DST): UTC+4:30 (IRDT)

Sorkh-e Kan (Persian: سرخكان, also Romanized as Sorkh-e Kān; also known as Sorkhegān) is a village in Garmsar Rural District, Jebalbarez-e Jonubi District, Anbarabad County, Kerman Province, Iran. At the 2006 census, its population was 135, in 28 families.
