= Salmanabad, Marvdasht =

Salmanabad سلمان اباد
- Village
- Country: Iran
- Province: Fars
- County: Marvdasht
- Bakhsh: Central
- Rural District: Mohammadabad

Population (2006)
  - Total: 15
- Time zone: UTC+3:30 (IRST)
  - Summer (DST): UTC+4:30 (IRDT)

Salmanabad (Persian: سلمان اباد, also Romanized as Salmānābād) is a village in Mohammadabad Rural District, in the Central District of Marvdasht County, Fars province, Iran. At the 2006 census, its population was 15, in 4 families.
