= Sorkh Kuh, South Khorasan =

Sorkh Kuh سرخ كوه
- Village
- Location within Iran
- Coordinates: 31°52′28″N 59°42′04″E
- Country: Iran
- Province: South Khorasan
- County: Nehbandan
- Bakhsh: Central
- Rural District: Meyghan

Population (2006)
  - Total: 35
- Time zone: UTC+3:30 (IRST)
  - Summer (DST): UTC+4:30 (IRDT)

Sorkh Kuh (Persian: سرخ كوه, also Romanized as Sorkh Kūh) is a village in Meyghan Rural District, in the Central District of Nehbandan County, South Khorasan Province, Iran. At the 2006 census, its population was 35, in 6 families.
