= Vakilabad, Narmashir =

Vakilabad وکیل‌آباد
- Village
- Location within Iran
- Coordinates: 28°59′23″N 58°37′23″E
- Country: Iran
- Province: Kerman
- County: Narmashir
- Bakhsh: Central
- Rural District: Posht Rud

Population (2006)
  - Total: 285
- Time zone: UTC+3:30 (IRST)
  - Summer (DST): UTC+4:30 (IRDT)

Vakilabad (Persian: وکیل‌آباد, also Romanized as Vakīlābād) is a village in Posht Rud Rural District, in the Central District of Narmashir County, Kerman Province, Iran. At the 2006 census, its population was 285, in 72 families.
