= Gonbaki, Kerman =

City in Kerman province, Iran

Gonbaki گنبکی
- City
- Location within Iran
- Coordinates: 28°43′08″N 58°51′57″E
- Country: Iran
- Province: Kerman
- County: Gonbaki
- District: Central

Population (2016)
  - Total: 7,210
- Time zone: UTC+3:30 (IRST)

Gonbaki (Persian: گنبکی) (Note: Formerly Mohammadabad-e Gonbaki, romanized as Mohammad Ābād-e-Gonbakī, Moḩammadābād Gonbakī, and Moḩammadābād-e Gonbakī; also known as Moḩammadābād and Moḩammadābād-e Gonbagī) is a city in the Central District (Note: Formerly Gonbaki District of Rigan County) of Gonbaki County, Kerman province, Iran, serving as capital of both the county and the district. It is also the administrative center for Gonbaki Rural District.

== History ==
In 2011, the village of Mohammadabad-e Gonbaki merged with the villages of Abbasabad, Aliabad, Behtarabad, Dowlatabad, Hasanabad, and Jannatabad to become the city of Gonbaki.

== Demographics ==
=== Population ===
At the time of the 2006 National Census, the population was 128 in 34 households, when it was the village of Mohammadad-e Gonbaki in Gonbaki Rural District of the former Rigan District of Bam County. The village did not appear in the census of 2011, by which time the district had been separated from the county in the establishment of Rigan County. The rural district was transferred to the new Gonbaki District. (Note: Renamed the Central District of Gonbaki County) The 2016 census measured the population as 7,210 people in 1,869 households, when the village had merged with six villages to become the city of Gonbaki.

In 2023, the district was separated from the county in the establishment of Gonbaki County and renamed the Central District, with Gonbaki as the new county's capital.
