= Ziaratgah, Shahdad =

Ziaratgah زيارتگاه
- Village
- Location within Iran
- Coordinates: 30°32′20″N 57°46′03″E
- Country: Iran
- Province: Kerman
- County: Kerman
- Bakhsh: Shahdad
- Rural District: Takab

Population (2006)
  - Total: 119
- Time zone: UTC+3:30 (IRST)
  - Summer (DST): UTC+4:30 (IRDT)

Ziaratgah (Persian: زيارتگاه, also Romanized as Zīāratgāh and Zīyāratgāh; also known as Deh-e Zeyāratqāh and Deh-e Zīāratgāh) is a village in Takab Rural District, Shahdad District, Kerman County, Kerman Province, Iran. At the 2006 census, its population was 119, in 24 families.
