= Ziarat-e Talang =

Ziarat-e Talang زيارت تلنگ
- Village
- Country: Iran
- Province: Hormozgan
- County: Minab
- Bakhsh: Central
- Rural District: Karian

Population (2006)
  - Total: 179
- Time zone: UTC+3:30 (IRST)
  - Summer (DST): UTC+4:30 (IRDT)

Ziarat-e Talang (Persian: زيارت تلنگ, also Romanized as Zīārat-e Talang) is a village in Karian Rural District, in the Central District of Minab County, Hormozgan Province, Iran. At the 2006 census, its population was 179, in 40 families.
