= Hemmatabad, Zarand =

Hemmatabad همت اباد
- Village
- Location within Iran
- Coordinates: 30°47′13″N 56°30′05″E
- Country: Iran
- Province: Kerman
- County: Zarand
- Bakhsh: Central
- Rural District: Mohammadabad

Population (2006)
  - Total: 420
- Time zone: UTC+3:30 (IRST)
  - Summer (DST): UTC+4:30 (IRDT)

Hemmatabad (Persian: همت اباد, also Romanized as Hemmatābād) is a village in Mohammadabad Rural District, in the Central District of Zarand County, Kerman Province, Iran. At the 2006 census, its population was 420, in 108 families.
