= Rustai-ye Vakilabad =

Rustai-ye Vakilabad روستاي وکيل اباد
- Village
- Location within Iran
- Coordinates: 27°50′39″N 57°55′29″E
- Country: Iran
- Province: Kerman
- County: Qaleh Ganj
- Bakhsh: Central
- Rural District: Sorkh Qaleh

Population (2006)
  - Total: 477
- Time zone: UTC+3:30 (IRST)
  - Summer (DST): UTC+4:30 (IRDT)

Rustai-ye Vakilabad (Persian: روستاي وکيل اباد, also Romanized as Rūstāi-ye Vakīlābād; also known as Vakīlābād) is a village in Sorkh Qaleh Rural District, in the Central District of Qaleh Ganj County, Kerman Province, Iran. At the 2006 census, its population was 477, in 104 families.
