= Ziarat-e Bozorg =

Ziarat-e Bozorg زيارت بزرگ
- Village
- Location within Iran
- Coordinates: 26°40′51″N 57°04′32″E
- Country: Iran
- Province: Hormozgan
- County: Minab
- Bakhsh: Byaban
- Rural District: Sirik

Population (2006)
  - Total: 532
- Time zone: UTC+3:30 (IRST)
  - Summer (DST): UTC+4:30 (IRDT)

Ziarat-e Bozorg (Persian: زيارت بزرگ, also Romanized as Zīārat-e Bozorg; also known as Zeyārat and Zīārat) is a village in Sirik Rural District, Byaban District, Minab County, Hormozgan Province, Iran. At the 2006 census, its population was 532, in 95 families.
