= Hemmatabad-e Sofla =

Hemmatabad-e Sofla همت ابادسفلي
- Village
- Location within Iran
- Coordinates: 30°24′25″N 57°49′59″E
- Country: Iran
- Province: Kerman
- County: Kerman
- Bakhsh: Shahdad
- Rural District: Takab

Population (2006)
  - Total: 247
- Time zone: UTC+3:30 (IRST)
  - Summer (DST): UTC+4:30 (IRDT)

Hemmatabad-e Sofla (Persian: همت ابادسفلي, also Romanized as Hemmatābād-e Soflá; also known as Hemmatābād, Hemmatābād-e Pā‘īn, and Himmatābād) is a village in Takab Rural District, Shahdad District, Kerman County, Kerman Province, Iran. At the 2006 census, its population was 247, in 57 families.
