= Ziarat-e Bacheh =

Ziarat-e Bacheh زيارت بچه
- Village
- Location within Iran
- Coordinates: 27°48′23″N 57°58′26″E
- Country: Iran
- Province: Kerman
- County: Qaleh Ganj
- Bakhsh: Central
- Rural District: Sorkh Qaleh

Population (2006)
  - Total: 538
- Time zone: UTC+3:30 (IRST)
  - Summer (DST): UTC+4:30 (IRDT)

Ziarat-e Bacheh (Persian: زيارت بچه, also Romanized as Zīārat-e Bacheh and Zīyāratbacheh) is a village in Sorkh Qaleh Rural District, in the Central District of Qaleh Ganj County, Kerman Province, Iran. At the 2006 census, its population was 538, in 118 families.
