= Hemmatabad-e Chah Zahra-ye Bala =

Hemmatabad-e Chah Zahra-ye Bala همت ابادچاه زهرابالا
- Village
- Location within Iran
- Coordinates: 29°03′06″N 55°58′43″E
- Country: Iran
- Province: Kerman
- County: Sirjan
- Bakhsh: Central
- Rural District: Golestan

Population (2006)
  - Total: 18
- Time zone: UTC+3:30 (IRST)
  - Summer (DST): UTC+4:30 (IRDT)

Hemmatabad-e Chah Zahra-ye Bala (Persian: همت ابادچاه زهرابالا, also Romanized as Hemmatābād-e Chāh Zahrā-ye Bālā; also known as Chāhzahrā) is a village in Golestan Rural District, in the Central District of Sirjan County, Kerman Province, Iran. At the 2006 census, its population was 18, in 4 families.
