= Sorkh Kuh, Hormozgan =

Sorkh Kuh سرخ كوه
- Village
- Location within Iran
- Coordinates: 25°50′00″N 57°30′00″E
- Country: Iran
- Province: Hormozgan
- County: Jask
- Bakhsh: Central
- Rural District: Kangan

Population (2006)
  - Total: 75
- Time zone: UTC+3:30 (IRST)
  - Summer (DST): UTC+4:30 (IRDT)

Sorkh Kuh (Persian: سرخ كوه, also Romanized as Sorkh Kūh; also known as Sohrkote) is a village in Kangan Rural District, in the Central District of Jask County, Hormozgan Province, Iran. At the 2006 census, its population was 75, in 14 families.
