= Vakilabad, Fasa =

Vakilabad وكيل اباد
- Village
- Location within Iran
- Coordinates: 29°08′05″N 53°28′39″E
- Country: Iran
- Province: Fars
- County: Fasa
- Bakhsh: Central
- Rural District: Jangal

Population (2006)
  - Total: 152
- Time zone: UTC+3:30 (IRST)
  - Summer (DST): UTC+4:30 (IRDT)

Vakilabad (Persian: وكيل اباد, also Romanized as Vakīlābād) is a village in Jangal Rural District, in the Central District of Fasa County, Fars province, Iran. At the 2006 census, its population was 152, in 34 families.
