= Ziarat-e Mir Meqdad =

Ziarat-e Mir Meqdad/Zegrdi زيارت ميرمقداد/زگردی
- Village
- Location within Iran
- Coordinates: 27°49′14″N 58°19′52″E
- Country: Iran
- Province: Kerman
- County: Rudbar-e Jonubi
- Bakhsh: Jazmurian
- Rural District: Jazmurian

Population (2006)
  - Total: 1,778
- Time zone: UTC+3:30 (IRST)
  - Summer (DST): UTC+4:30 (IRDT)

Ziarat-e Mir Meqdad (Persian: زيارت ميرمقداد, also Romanized as Zīārat-e Mīr Meqdād and Zīārat-e Mīr Moqdād; also known as Zeyāratgāh-e Mīr Megdād, Zīāratgāh-e Mīr Meghdād, and Zīāratgāh-e Mīr Meqdād) is a village in Jazmurian Rural District, Jazmurian District, Rudbar-e Jonubi County, Kerman Province, Iran. At the 2006 census, its population was 1,778, in 366 families.
