= Hemmatabad, Nasrabad =

Hemmatabad همت اباد
- Village
- Location within Iran
- Coordinates: 31°46′41″N 53°47′42″E
- Country: Iran
- Province: Yazd
- County: Taft
- Bakhsh: Central
- Rural District: Nasrabad

Population (2006)
  - Total: 260
- Time zone: UTC+3:30 (IRST)
  - Summer (DST): UTC+4:30 (IRDT)

Hemmatabad (Persian: همت اباد, romanized: Hemmatābād) is a village in Nasrabad Rural District, in the Central District of Taft County, Yazd Province, Iran. At the 2006 census, its population was 260, in 77 families.
