= Vakilabad, Koshkuiyeh =

Vakilabad وكيل اباد
- Village
- Location within Iran
- Coordinates: 30°37′19″N 55°34′11″E
- Country: Iran
- Province: Kerman
- County: Rafsanjan
- Bakhsh: Koshkuiyeh
- Rural District: Sharifabad

Population (2006)
  - Total: 24
- Time zone: UTC+3:30 (IRST)
  - Summer (DST): UTC+4:30 (IRDT)

Vakilabad (Persian: وكيل اباد, also Romanized as Vakīlābād) is a village in Sharifabad Rural District, Koshkuiyeh District, Rafsanjan County, Kerman Province, Iran. At the 2006 census, its population was 24, in 4 families.
