= Ziyarat-e Miromar =

Ziyarat-e Miromar زيارت ميرعمر
- Village
- Location within Iran
- Coordinates: 27°04′31″N 59°00′38″E
- Country: Iran
- Province: Sistan and Baluchestan
- County: Dalgan
- Bakhsh: Jolgeh-ye Chah Hashem
- Rural District: Jolgeh-ye Chah Hashem

Population (2006)
  - Total: 157
- Time zone: UTC+3:30 (IRST)
  - Summer (DST): UTC+4:30 (IRDT)

Ziyarat-e Miromar (Persian: زيارت ميرعمر, also Romanized as Zīyārat-e Mīrʿomar) is a village in Jolgeh-ye Chah Hashem Rural District, Jolgeh-ye Chah Hashem District, Dalgan County, Sistan and Baluchestan Province, Iran. At the 2006 census, its population was 157, in 27 families.
