= Hemmatabad-e Olya, Rafsanjan =

Hemmatabad-e Olya همت آبادعليا
- Village
- Location within Iran
- Coordinates: 30°24′19″N 56°04′02″E
- Country: Iran
- Province: Kerman
- County: Rafsanjan
- Bakhsh: Central
- Rural District: Qasemabad

Population (2006)
  - Total: 1,582
- Time zone: UTC+3:30 (IRST)
  - Summer (DST): UTC+4:30 (IRDT)

Hemmatabad-e Olya (Persian: همت آبادعليا, also Romanized as Hemmatābād-e ‘Olyā and Hemmat Abad Olya; also known as Hemmatābād and Hemmatābād-e Bālā) is a village in Qasemabad Rural District, in the Central District of Rafsanjan County, Kerman Province, Iran. At the 2006 census, its population was 1,582, in 380 families.
