= Sorkhakan, Kerman =

Sorkhakan سرخ كان
- Village
- Location within Iran
- Coordinates: 29°47′41″N 56°46′52″E
- Country: Iran
- Province: Kerman
- County: Bardsir
- Bakhsh: Central
- Rural District: Negar

Population (2006)
  - Total: 338
- Time zone: UTC+3:30 (IRST)
  - Summer (DST): UTC+4:30 (IRDT)

Sorkhakan (Persian: سرخ كان, also Romanized as Sorkhakān and Sorkhekān; also known as Sorkhagān, Sorkhegān, Sorkh Kūh, and Surkh Kān) is a village in Negar Rural District, in the Central District of Bardsir County, Kerman Province, Iran. At the 2006 census, its population was 338, in 80 families.
