= Mohammadabad, Kerman =

City in Kerman province, Iran

Mohammadabad Persian: محمدآباد
- City
- Location within Iran
- Coordinates: 28°39′06″N 59°00′57″E
- Country: Iran
- Province: Kerman
- County: Rigan
- District: Central

Population (2016)
  - Total: 20,720
- Time zone: UTC+3:30 (IRST)

Mohammadabad (Persian: محمدآباد) (Note: Also romanized as Moḩammadābād; also known as Moḩammadābād-e Rīgān and Muhammadābād) is a city in the Central District of Rigan County, Kerman province, Iran, serving as capital of both the county and the district. It is also the administrative center for Rigan Rural District.

== Demographics ==
=== Population ===
At the time of the 2006 National Census, the city's population was 5,773 in 1,295 households, when it was capital of the former Rigan District of Bam County. The following census in 2011 counted 9,664 people in 2,856 households, by which time the district had been separated from the county in the establishment of Rigan County. The city and the rural district were transferred to the new Central District, with Mohammadabad as the county's capital. The 2016 census measured the population of the city as 20,720 people in 4,828 households.
