= Gonbaki County =

County in Kerman province, Iran

Gonbaki County Persian: شهرستان گنبکی
- County
- Location of Gonbaki County in Kerman province (center right, yellow)

- Location of Kerman province in Iran
- Coordinates: 28°31′27″N 58°45′27″E
- Country: Iran
- Province: Kerman
- Capital: Gonbaki
- Districts: Central, Naseriyeh
- Time zone: UTC+3:30 (IRST)

Gonbaki County (Persian: شهرستان گنبکی) is in Kerman province, Iran. Its capital is the city of Gonbaki, (Note: Formerly the village of Mohammadabad-e Gonbaki) whose population at the time of the 2016 National Census was 7,210 people in 1,869 households.

== History ==
After the 2006 census, Rigan District was separated from Bam County in the establishment of Rigan County, which was divided into two districts of two rural districts each, with Mohammadabad as its capital and only city at the time.

In 2023, Gonbaki District (Note: Renamed the Central District of Gonbaki County) was separated from the county in the establishment of Gonbaki County and renamed the Central District. The new county was divided into two districts of two rural districts each, with Gonbaki as its capital and only city at the time.

== Demographics ==
=== Administrative divisions ===
Gonbaki County's administrative structure is shown in the following table.

Gonbaki County
Administrative Divisions
Central District (Note: Formerly Gonbaki District of Rigan County)
Gonbaki RD
Ziarat RD
Gonbaki (city)
Naseriyeh District
Kahur Khoshk RD
Naseriyeh RD
RD = Rural District

== See also ==
Media related to Gonbaki County at Wikimedia Commons
