= Gonbaki Rural District =

Rural district in Kerman province, Iran

Gonbaki Rural District Persian: دهستان گنبكي
- Rural District
- Location within Iran
- Coordinates: 28°43′08″N 58°51′57″E
- Country: Iran
- Province: Kerman
- County: Gonbaki
- District: Central
- Capital: Gonbaki

Population (2016)
  - Total: 4,585
- Time zone: UTC+3:30 (IRST)

Gonbaki Rural District (Persian: دهستان گنبكي) is in the Central District (Note: Formerly Gonbaki District of Rigan County) of Gonbaki County, Kerman province, Iran. It is administered from the city of Gonbaki. (Note: Formerly the village of Mohammadabad-e Gonbaki)

== Demographics ==
=== Population ===
At the time of the 2006 National Census, the rural district's population (as a part of the former Rigan District of Bam County) was 11,926 in 2,554 households. There were 7,790 inhabitants in 2,080 households at the following census of 2011, by which time the district had been separated from the county in the establishment of Rigan County. The rural district was transferred to the new Gonbaki District. (Note: Renamed the Central District of Gonbaki County) The 2016 census measured the population of the rural district as 4,585 in 1,435 households. The most populous of its 20 villages was Shaltukabad, with 1,004 people.

In 2023, the district was separated from the county in the establishment of Gonbaki County and renamed the Central District.

== See also ==
Hojjatabad, a village in the rural district
