= Central District (Gonbaki County) =

District in Kerman province, Iran

Central District (Gonbaki County) Persian: بخش مرکزی شهرستان گنبکی
- District
- Location within Iran
- Coordinates: 28°41′30″N 58°44′30″E
- Country: Iran
- Province: Kerman
- County: Gonbaki
- Capital: Gonbaki

Population (2016)
  - Total: 25,976 (Note: As Gonbaki District of Rigan County)
- Time zone: UTC+3:30 (IRST)

The Central District of Gonbaki County (Persian: بخش مرکزی شهرستان گنبکی) (Note: Formerly Gonbaki District (بخش گنبکی) of Rigan County) is in Kerman province, Iran. Its capital is the city of Gonbaki. (Note: Formerly the village of Mohammadabad-e Gonbaki)

== History ==
After the 2006 census, Rigan District was separated from Bam County in the establishment of Rigan County, which was divided into two districts of two rural districts each, with Mohammadabad as its capital and only city at the time.

In 2023, Gonbaki District (Note: Renamed the Central District of Gonbaki County) was separated from the county in the establishment of Gonbaki County and renamed the Central District. The new county was divided into two districts of two rural districts each, with Gonbaki as its capital and only city at the time.

== Demographics ==
=== Population ===
At the time of the 2011 National Census, the district's population (as Gonbaki District of Rigan County) was 20,185 in 5,407 households. The following census in 2016 counted 25,976 people in 7,514 households.

=== Administrative divisions ===
Central District (Gonbaki County) (Note: As Gonbaki District of Rigan County at the 2011 and 2016 censuses)
Administrative Divisions	2011	2016
Gonbaki RD	7,790	4,585
Naseriyeh RD (Note: Transferred to Naseriyeh District after the 2016 census)	12,395	14,181
Ziarat RD (Note: Established after the 2016 census)		
Gonbaki (city)		7,210
Total	20,185	25,976
RD = Rural District
