= Rigan Rural District =

Rural district in Kerman province, Iran

Rigan Rural District Persian: دهستان ريگان
- Rural District
- Location within Iran
- Coordinates: 28°40′56″N 59°04′38″E
- Country: Iran
- Province: Kerman
- County: Rigan
- District: Central
- Capital: Mohammadabad

Population (2016)
  - Total: 36,933
- Time zone: UTC+3:30 (IRST)

Rigan Rural District (Persian: دهستان ريگان) is in the Central District of Rigan County, Kerman province, Iran. It is administered from the city of Mohammadabad.

== Demographics ==
=== Population ===
At the time of the 2006 National Census, the rural district's population (as a part of the former Rigan District of Bam County) was 26,114 in 5,705 households. There were 32,023 inhabitants in 8,188 households at the following census of 2011, by which time the rural district had been separated from the county in the establishment of Rigan County and was transferred to the new Central District. The 2016 census measured the population of the rural district as 36,933 in 10,392 households. The most populous of its 112 villages was Abbasabad-e Sardar (now a city), with 5,125 people.
