= Rigan District =

Former district in Kerman province, Iran

Rigan District Persian: بخش ریگان
- Former District
- Location within Iran
- Coordinates: 28°21′21″N 59°13′46″E
- Country: Iran
- Province: Kerman
- County: Bam
- Capital: Mohammadabad

Population (2006)
  - Total: 70,908
- Time zone: UTC+3:30 (IRST)

Rigan District (Persian: بخش ریگان) is a former administrative division of Bam County, Kerman province, Iran. Its capital was the city of Mohammadabad.

== History ==
After the 2006 National Census, the district was separated from the county in the establishment of Rigan County.

== Demographics ==
=== Population ===
At the time of the 2006 census, the district's population was 70,908 in 15,539 households.

=== Administrative divisions ===
Rigan District Population
Administrative Divisions	2006
Chahdegal RD (Note: Transferred to Fahraj County)	17,849
Gavkan RD	9,246
Gonbaki RD	11,926
Rigan RD	26,114
Mohammadabad (city)	5,773
Total	70,908
RD = Rural District
