= Gavkan Rural District =

Rural district in Kerman province, Iran

Gavkan Rural District Persian: دهستان گاوكان
- Rural District
- Location within Iran
- Coordinates: 28°12′50″N 58°52′53″E
- Country: Iran
- Province: Kerman
- County: Rigan
- District: Rahmatabad
- Capital: Dahaneh-ye Abbasali

Population (2016)
  - Total: 4,780
- Time zone: UTC+3:30 (IRST)

Gavkan Rural District (Persian: دهستان گاوكان) is in Rahmatabad District of Rigan County, Kerman province, Iran. Its capital is the village of Dahaneh-ye Abbasali.

== Demographics ==
=== Population ===
At the time of the 2006 National Census, the rural district's population (as a part of the former Rigan District of Bam County) was 9,246 in 1,826 households. There were 4,463 inhabitants in 1,157 households at the following census of 2011, by which time the district had been separated from the county in the establishment of Rigan County. The rural district was transferred to the new Central District. The 2016 census measured the population of the rural district as 4,780 in 1,248 households. The most populous of its 81 villages was Dahaneh-ye Abbasali, with 539 people.

In 2023, the rural district was separated from the district in the formation of Rahmatabad District.
