= Central District (Rigan County) =

District in Kerman province, Iran

Central District (Rigan County) Persian: بخش مرکزی شهرستان ریگان
- District
- Location within Iran
- Coordinates: 28°39′42″N 59°16′00″E
- Country: Iran
- Province: Kerman
- County: Rigan
- Capital: Mohammadabad

Population (2016)
  - Total: 62,433
- Time zone: UTC+3:30 (IRST)

The Central District of Rigan County (Persian: بخش مرکزی شهرستان ریگان) is in Kerman province, Iran. Its capital is the city of Mohammadabad.

== History ==
After the 2006 National Census, Rigan District was separated from Bam County in the establishment of Rigan County. In 2019, the village of Abbasabad-e Sardar was elevated to the status of a city.

In 2023, Posht-e Rig Rural District was established in the Central District, and Gavkan Rural District was separated from it in the formation of Rahmatabad District.

== Demographics ==
=== Population ===
At the time of the 2011 census, the district's population was 46,150 in 12,201 households. The 2016 census measured the population of the district as 62,433 inhabitants in 16,468 households.

=== Administrative divisions ===
Central District (Rigan County) Population
Administrative Divisions	2011	2016
Gavkan RD (Note: Transferred to Rahmatabad District after the 2016 census)	4,463	4,780
Posht-e Rig RD (Note: Established after the 2016 census)		
Rigan RD	32,023	36,933
Abbasabad-e Sardar (city) (Note: Became a city after the 2016 census)		
Mohammadabad (city)	9,664	20,720
Total	46,150	62,433
RD = Rural District
