= Rigan County =

County in Kerman province, Iran

Rigan County Persian: شهرستان ریگان
- County
- Location of Rigan County in Kerman province (right, green)

- Location of Kerman province in Iran
- Coordinates: 28°21′21″N 59°13′46″E
- Country: Iran
- Province: Kerman
- Capital: Mohammadabad
- Districts: Central, Rahmatabad

Population (2016)
  - Total: 88,410
- Time zone: UTC+3:30 (IRST)

Rigan County (Persian: شهرستان ریگان) is in Kerman province, Iran. Its capital is the city of Mohammadabad.

== History ==
After the 2006 National Census, Rigan District was separated from Bam County in the establishment of Rigan County. In 2019, the villages of Abbasabad-e Sardar and Rahmatabad were elevated to city status.

In 2023, Gonbaki District (Note: Renamed the Central District of Gonbaki County) was separated from the county in the establishment of Gonbaki County and renamed the Central District. At the same time, Posht-e Rig Rural District was established in the Central District of Rigan County, and Gavkan Rural District was separated from it in the formation of Rahmatabad District, including the new Sadabad Rural District.

== Demographics ==
=== Population ===
At the time of the 2011 census, the county's population was 66,335 people in 17,598 households. The 2016 census measured the population of the county as 88,410 in 23,983 households.

=== Administrative divisions ===
Rigan County's population history and administrative structure over two consecutive censuses are shown in the following table.

Rigan County Population
Administrative Divisions	2011	2016
Central District	46,150	62,433
Gavkan RD	4,463	4,780
Posht-e Rig RD (Note: Established after the 2016 census)		
Rigan RD	32,023	36,933
Abbasabad-e Sardar (city) (Note: Became a city after the 2016 census)		
Mohammadabad (city)	9,664	20,720
Gonbaki District (Note: Transferred to Gonbaki County and renamed the Central District after the 2016 census)	20,185	25,976
Gonbaki RD	7,790	4,585
Naseriyeh RD	12,395	14,181
Gonbaki (city)		7,210
Rahmatabad District		
Gavkan RD		
Sadabad RD		
Rahmatabad (city)		
Total	66,335	88,410
RD = Rural District

== See also ==
Media related to Rigan County at Wikimedia Commons
