= Mehdiabad, Iran =

Mehdiabad or Mahdiabad (Persian: مهدياباد) in Iran may refer to:

== Alborz Province ==
- Mehdiabad, Eshtehard, a village in Eshtehard County
- Mehdiabad, Savojbolagh, a village in Savojbolagh Count

== Chaharmahal and Bakhtiari Province ==
- Mehdiabad, Bazoft, a village in Kuhrang County
- Mehdiabad-e Yek, Chaharmahal and Bakhtiari, a village in Kuhrang County

== Fars Province ==
- Mehdiabad, Bavanat, a village in Bavanat County
- Mehdiabad, Darab, a village in Darab County
- Mehdiabad, Eqlid, a village in Eqlid County
- Mehdiabad, Fasa, a village in Fasa County
- Mehdiabad, Now Bandegan, a village in Fasa County
- Mehdiabad, Dorudzan, a village in Marvdasht County
- Mehdiabad, Seyyedan, a village in Marvdasht County
- Mehdiabad, Shiraz, a village in Shiraz County
- Mehdiabad, Derak, a village in Shiraz County

== Gilan Province ==
- Mehdiabad, Gilan, a village in Lahijan County

== Golestan Province ==
- Mehdiabad, Aliabad, a village in Aliabad County
- Mehdiabad, Azadshahr, a village in Azadshahr County
- Mehdiabad, Gonbad-e Qabus, a village in Gonbad-e Qabus County

== Hamadan Province ==
- Mehdiabad, Hamadan, a village in Hamadan County
- Mehdiabad, Malayer, a village in Malayer County

== Hormozgan Province ==
- Mahdiabad, Hormozgan, a village in Bandar Abbas County
- Mohammadabad, Hajjiabad, a village in Hajjiabad County

== Ilam Province ==
- Mehdiabad, Ilam, a village in Ilam County

== Isfahan Province ==
- Mehdiabad, Dehaqan, a village in Dehaqan County
- Mehdiabad, Isfahan, a village in Isfahan County
- Mehdiabad, Sistan, a village in Isfahan County
- Mehdiabad, Semirom, a village in Semirom County
- Mehdiabad, Tiran and Karvan, a village in Tiran and Karvan County

== Kerman Province ==
=== Anar County ===
- Mehdiabad-e Amin, a village in Anar County

=== Bam County ===
- Mehdiabad-e Darzin, a village in Bam County

=== Fahraj County ===
- Mehdiabad-e Olya, a village in Fahraj County

=== Kerman County ===
- Mehdiabad, Ekhtiarabad, a village in Kerman County

=== Narmashir County ===
- Mehdiabad, Narmashir, a village in Narmashir County

=== Rafsanjan County ===
- Mehdiabad, Rafsanjan, a village in Rafsanjan County
- Mehdiabad, Azadegan, a village in Rafsanjan County
- Mehdiabad-e Aminiyan, a village in Rafsanjan County
- Mehdiabad-e Sardar, a village in Rafsanjan County
- Mehdiabad-e Vahed, a village in Rafsanjan County

=== Rigan County ===
- Mehdiabad, Rigan, a village in Rigan County

=== Sirjan County ===
- Mehdiabad, Sirjan, a village in Sirjan County
- Mehdiabad-e Taqi, a village in Sirjan County
- Mehdiabad-e Yek, Kerman, a village in Sirjan County

=== Zarand County ===
- Mehdiabad, Zarand, a village in Zarand County

== Kermanshah Province ==
- Mehdiabad-e Sofla, a village in Kermanshah County

== Khuzestan Province ==
- Mehdiabad, Gotvand, a village in Gotvand County
- Mehdiabad, Hendijan, a village in Hendijan County
- Mehdiabad-e Kalak Shuran, a village in Lali County
- Mehdiabad, Shushtar, a village in Shushtar County

== Kohgiluyeh and Boyer-Ahmad Province ==
- Mehdiabad-e Khan Ahmad, a village in Basht County
- Mehdiabad-e Jalaleh, a village in Dana County

== Lorestan Province ==
- Mehdiabad, Khorramabad, a village in Khorramabad County

== Markazi Province ==
- Mehdiabad, Delijan, a village in Delijan County
- Mehdiabad, Khomeyn, a village in Khomeyn County
- Mehdiabad, Komijan, a village in Komijan County
- Mehdiabad, Shazand, a village in Shazand County

== Mazandaran Province ==
- Mehdiabad, Babol, a village in Babol County
- Mehdiabad, Behshahr, a village in Behshahr County
- Mehdiabad, Chalus, a village in Chalus County
- Mehdiabad, Qaem Shahr, a village in Qaem Shahr County
- Mehdiabad, Savadkuh, a village in Savadkuh County
- Mahdiabad, Tonekabon, a village in Tonekabon County

== North Khorasan Province ==
- Mehdiabad, North Khorasan, a village in Esfarayen County

== Qazvin Province ==
- Mehdiabad, Qazvin, a village in Takestan County
- Mehdiabad-e Bozorg, a village in Qazvin County

== Razavi Khorasan Province ==
- Mehdiabad, Chenaran, a village in Chenaran County
- Mehdiabad, Khalilabad, a village in Khalilabad County
- Mehdiabad, Darzab, a village in Mashhad County
- Mehdiabad, Kenevist, a village in Mashhad County
- Mehdiabad, Tus, a village in Mashhad County
- Mehdiabad, Nishapur, a village in Nishapur County
- Mehdiabad-e Qaleh Now, a village in Nishapur County
- Mehdiabad, Rashtkhvar, a village in Rashtkhvar County
- Mehdiabad, Torbat-e Jam, a village in Torbat-e Jam County

== Semnan Province ==
- Mehdiabad, Damghan, a village in Damghan County
- Mehdiabad, Shahrud, a village in Shahrud County
- Mehdiabad, Meyami, a village in Meyami County

== South Khorasan Province ==
- Mehdiabad, Birjand, a village in Birjand County
- Mehdiabad, Boshruyeh, a village in Boshruyeh County
- Mehdiabad, Darmian, a village in Darmian County
- Mehdiabad, Nehbandan, a village in Nehbandan County
- Mehdiabad, Qaen, a village in Qaen County
- Mehdiabad, Tabas, a village in Tabas County
- Mehdiabad, Dastgerdan, a village in Tabas County

== Tehran Province ==
- Mehdiabad, Rey, a village in Rey County
- Mehdiabad, Varamin, a village in Varamin County
- Mehdiabad, Javadabad, a village in Varamin County

== Yazd Province ==
- Mehdiabad, Saduq, a village in Saduq County
- Mahdiabad, Aliabad, a village in Taft County
- Mehdiabad, Kahduiyeh, a village in Taft County
- Mehdiabad, Nasrabad, a village in Taft County
- Mehdiabad, Zardeyn, a village in Taft County

== Zanjan Province ==
- Mehdiabad, Zanjan, a village in Khodabandeh County
