= Jowzardan-e Olya =

Village in South Khorasan province, Iran

Jowzardan-e Olya Persian: جوزردان عليا
- Village
- Location within Iran
- Coordinates: 33°52′18″N 57°13′48″E
- Country: Iran
- Province: South Khorasan
- County: Boshruyeh
- District: Central
- Rural District: Korond

Population (2016)
  - Total: 129
- Time zone: UTC+3:30 (IRST)

Jowzardan-e Olya (Persian: جوزردان عليا) (Note: Also romanized as Jowzardān-e ‘Olyā; also known as Gowdīzhdū, Jowzadān-e ‘Olyā, Jowzardān-e Bālā, Jowzurdan-e Olya, and Jowzūrdān-e ‘Olyā) is a village in Korond Rural District of the Central District in Boshruyeh County, South Khorasan province, Iran.

== Demographics ==
=== Population ===
At the time of the 2006 National Census, the village's population was 93 in 32 households, when it was in Raqqeh Rural District of the former Boshruyeh District in Ferdows County. The following census in 2011 counted 95 people in 33 households, by which time the district had been separated from the county in the establishment of Boshruyeh County. The rural district was transferred to the new Eresk District, and Jowzardan-e Olya was transferred to Korond Rural District created in the new Central District. The 2016 census measured the population of the village as 129 people in 45 households.
