= Azizabad, South Khorasan =

Village in South Khorasan province, Iran

Azizabad Persian: عزيزاباد
- Village
- Location within Iran
- Coordinates: 33°56′30″N 57°12′37″E
- Country: Iran
- Province: South Khorasan
- County: Boshruyeh
- District: Central
- Rural District: Korond

Population (2016)
  - Total: 20
- Time zone: UTC+3:30 (IRST)

Azizabad (Persian: عزيزاباد) (Note: Also romanized as ‘Azīzābād) is a village in Korond Rural District of the Central District in Boshruyeh County, South Khorasan province, Iran.

== Demographics ==
=== Population ===
At the time of the 2006 National Census, the village's population was 64 in 22 households, when it was in Ali Jamal Rural District of the former Boshruyeh District in Ferdows County. The following census in 2011 counted 46 people in 19 households, by which time the district had been separated from the county in the establishment of Boshruyeh County. The rural district was transferred to the new Central District, and Azizabad was transferred to Korond Rural District created in the same district. The 2016 census measured the population of the village as 60 people in 20 households.
