= Beheshtabad, Boshruyeh =

Village in South Khorasan province, Iran

Beheshtabad Persian: بهشت اباد
- Village
- Location within Iran
- Country: Iran
- Province: South Khorasan
- County: Boshruyeh
- District: Central
- Rural District: Korond

Population (2016)
  - Total: 16
- Time zone: UTC+3:30 (IRST)

Beheshtabad (Persian: بهشت اباد) (Note: Also romanized as Beheshtābād) is a village in Korond Rural District of the Central District in Boshruyeh County, South Khorasan province, Iran.

== Demographics ==
=== Population ===
At the time of the 2006 National Census, the village's population was 27 in six households, when it was in Ali Jamal Rural District of the former Boshruyeh District in Ferdows County. The following census in 2011 counted 17 people in five households, by which time the district had been separated from the county in the establishment of Boshruyeh County. The rural district was transferred to the new Central District, and Beheshtabad was transferred to Korond Rural District created in the same district. The 2016 census measured the population of the village as 16 people in five households.
