= Zeroft =

Village in South Khorasan province, Iran

Zeroft Persian: زرفت
- Village
- Location within Iran
- Coordinates: 33°55′22″N 57°09′23″E
- Country: Iran
- Province: South Khorasan
- County: Boshruyeh
- District: Central
- Rural District: Korond

Population (2016)
  - Total: 20
- Time zone: UTC+3:30 (IRST)

Zeroft (Persian: زرفت) is a village in Korond Rural District of the Central District in Boshruyeh County, South Khorasan province, Iran.

== Demographics ==
=== Population ===
At the time of the 2006 National Census, the village's population was 22 in five households, when it was in Ali Jamal Rural District of the former Boshruyeh District in Ferdows County. The following census in 2011 counted 19 people in six households, by which time the district had been separated from the county in the establishment of Boshruyeh County. The rural district was transferred to the new Central District, and Zeroft was transferred to Korond Rural District created in the same district. The 2016 census measured the population of the village as 20 people in seven households.
