= Ahjuk =

Village in South Khorasan province, Iran

Ahjuk Persian: اهجوك
- Village
- Location within Iran
- Coordinates: 33°56′6″N 57°12′49″E
- Country: Iran
- Province: South Khorasan
- County: Boshruyeh
- District: Central
- Rural District: Korond

Population (2016)
  - Total: 20
- Below reporting threshold
- Time zone: UTC+3:30 (IRST)

Ahjuk (Persian: اهجوك) (Note: Also romanized as Āhjūk; also known as Ah Chūk, Āhchūk, Ahghuk, Āhghūk) is a village in Korond Rural District of the Central District in Boshruyeh County, South Khorasan province, Iran.

== Demographics ==
=== Population ===
At the time of the 2006 National Census, the village's population was 17 in four households, when it was in Ali Jamal Rural District of the former Boshruyeh District in Ferdows County. The following census in 2011 counted a population below the reporting threshold, by which time the district had been separated from the county in the establishment of Boshruyeh County. The rural district was transferred to the new Central District, and Ahjuk was transferred to Korond Rural District created in the same district. The 2016 census measured the population of the village as again below the reporting threshold.
