= Boshruyeh =

City in South Khorasan province, Iran

Boshruyeh Persian: بشرویه
- City
- Location within Iran
- Coordinates: 33°52′05″N 57°25′43″E
- Country: Iran
- Province: South Khorasan
- County: Boshruyeh
- District: Central

Population (2016)
  - Total: 16,426
- Time zone: UTC+3:30 (IRST)

Boshruyeh (Persian: بشرویه) (Note: Also romanized as Boshrūyeh) is a city in the Central District of Boshruyeh County, South Khorasan province, Iran, serving as capital of both the county and the district.

Boshruyeh is between the cities of Ferdows and Tabas at the border of the Dasht-e Kavir. Near there city, there are old villages named Eresk (now a city), Raqqeh, Korond, Neygenan, and Ghaniabad.

== History ==
There are several historic buildings in Boshruyeh and its surroundings. Based on historical books, it seems that this city has been in existence for at least 700 years. Some of the most famous buildings are:

1. Qaleh-ye Dokhtar "Young Woman's Castle": This citadel is located on the top of a mountain in the west of the city. It has been reported that this huge and ancient building was a governmental work from the period of Ismāīlī governance of this region..

2. Hosseynie Haj Ali Ashraf "Haj Ali Ashraf's Hussayniyya": This building has Indian architecture and is used for azadari "religious mourning rites" during the month of Muharram

3. Masjed Mian Deh "Center-City Mosque": This mosque dates back 400 years.

4. Sarāy-e Serke: This ancient and simple house is famous and is also used for azadari.

== Demographics ==
=== Population ===
At the time of the 2006 National Census, the city's population was 13,778 in 3,638 households, when it was capital of the former Boshruyeh District in Ferdows County. The following census in 2011 counted 15,318 people in 4,325 households, by which time the district had been separated from the county in the establishment of Boshruyeh County. Boshruyeh was transferred to the new Central District as the county's capital. The 2016 census measured the population of the city as 16,426 people in 4,973 households.

== Climate ==
Boshruyeh has a hot desert climate (BWh) according to the Köppen climate classification. The weather usually is warm and in summer it is very hot. The average rain in a year is less than 150 mm.

Climate data for Boshruyeh (1988-2005 normals)
Month	Jan	Feb	Mar	Apr	May	Jun	Jul	Aug	Sep	Oct	Nov	Dec	Year
Mean daily maximum °C (°F)	11.2 (52.2)	14.6 (58.3)	20.2 (68.4)	28.0 (82.4)	33.5 (92.3)	39.1 (102.4)	40.3 (104.5)	38.9 (102.0)	35.2 (95.4)	28.4 (83.1)	20.4 (68.7)	13.3 (55.9)	26.9 (80.5)
Daily mean °C (°F)	5.4 (41.7)	8.0 (46.4)	13.2 (55.8)	20.2 (68.4)	25.5 (77.9)	30.5 (86.9)	32.1 (89.8)	30.0 (86.0)	25.7 (78.3)	19.4 (66.9)	12.4 (54.3)	7.0 (44.6)	19.1 (66.4)
Mean daily minimum °C (°F)	−0.5 (31.1)	1.4 (34.5)	6.2 (43.2)	12.4 (54.3)	17.4 (63.3)	22.0 (71.6)	23.9 (75.0)	21.1 (70.0)	16.3 (61.3)	10.5 (50.9)	4.5 (40.1)	0.6 (33.1)	11.3 (52.4)
Average precipitation mm (inches)	17.5 (0.69)	17.6 (0.69)	24.0 (0.94)	12.3 (0.48)	5.3 (0.21)	0.2 (0.01)	0.1 (0.00)	0.0 (0.0)	0.0 (0.0)	0.8 (0.03)	4.2 (0.17)	15.3 (0.60)	97.3 (3.82)
Average relative humidity (%)	64	53	46	35	27	21	21	21	22	30	42	60	37
Average dew point °C (°F)	−1.3 (29.7)	−1.3 (29.7)	1.0 (33.8)	3.8 (38.8)	5.4 (41.7)	6.6 (43.9)	7.9 (46.2)	6.1 (43.0)	2.9 (37.2)	1.4 (34.5)	−0.3 (31.5)	−0.8 (30.6)	2.6 (36.7)
Mean monthly sunshine hours	165.6	182.1	208.6	235.8	324.9	352.8	365.4	331.2	279.0	261.9	200.8	157.9	3,066
Source: IRIMO(temperatures), (dew point), (humidity), (precipitation), (sunshine)
