= Majd, Iran =

Village in South Khorasan province, Iran

Majd Persian: مجد
- Village
- Location within Iran
- Coordinates: 33°47′49″N 57°14′45″E
- Country: Iran
- Province: South Khorasan
- County: Boshruyeh
- District: Eresk
- Rural District: Raqqeh

Population (2016)
  - Total: 125
- Time zone: UTC+3:30 (IRST)

Majd (Persian: مجد) is a village in Raqqeh Rural District of Eresk District in Boshruyeh County, South Khorasan province, Iran.

== Demographics ==
=== Population ===
At the time of the 2006 National Census, the village's population was 139 in 33 households, when it was in the former Boshruyeh District of Ferdows County. The following census in 2011 counted 102 people in 30 households, by which time the district had been separated from the county in the establishment of Boshruyeh County. The rural district was transferred to the new Eresk District. The 2016 census measured the population of the village as 125 people in 41 households.
