= Mirabad, Boshruyeh =

Mirabad ميراباد
- Village
- Location within Iran
- Coordinates: 34°01′56″N 57°11′56″E
- Country: Iran
- Province: South Khorasan
- County: Boshruyeh
- Bakhsh: Central
- Rural District: Ali Jamal

Population (2006)
  - Total: 42
- Time zone: UTC+3:30 (IRST)
  - Summer (DST): UTC+4:30 (IRDT)

Mirabad (Persian: ميراباد, also Romanized as Mīrābād) is a village in Ali Jamal Rural District, in the Central District of Boshruyeh County, South Khorasan Province, Iran. At the 2006 census, its population was 42, in 9 families.
