= Khanik, Boshruyeh =

Khanik خانيك
- Village
- Location within Iran
- Coordinates: 33°59′53″N 57°14′06″E
- Country: Iran
- Province: South Khorasan
- County: Boshruyeh
- Bakhsh: Central
- Rural District: Ali Jamal

Population (2006)
  - Total: 13
- Time zone: UTC+3:30 (IRST)
  - Summer (DST): UTC+4:30 (IRDT)

Khanik (Persian: خانيك, also Romanized as Khānīk) is a village in Ali Jamal Rural District, in the Central District of Boshruyeh County, South Khorasan Province, Iran. At the 2006 census, its population was 13, in 5 families.
