= Deh-e Sefid, South Khorasan =

Deh-e Sefid ده سفيد
- Village
- Location within Iran
- Coordinates: 34°18′11″N 57°21′58″E
- Country: Iran
- Province: South Khorasan
- County: Boshruyeh
- Bakhsh: Central
- Rural District: Ali Jamal

Population (2006)
  - Total: 30
- Time zone: UTC+3:30 (IRST)
  - Summer (DST): UTC+4:30 (IRDT)

Deh-e Sefid (Persian: ده سفيد, also Romanized as Deh-e Sefīd) is a village in Ali Jamal Rural District, in the Central District of Boshruyeh County, South Khorasan Province, Iran. At the 2006 census, its population was 30, in 12 families.
