= Bandan, Boshruyeh =

Village in South Khorasan province, Iran

Bandan Persian: بندان
- Village
- Location within Iran
- Coordinates: 34°18′32″N 57°23′00″E
- Country: Iran
- Province: South Khorasan
- County: Boshruyeh
- District: Central
- Rural District: Ali Jamal

Population (2016)
  - Total: 60
- Time zone: UTC+3:30 (IRST)

Bandan (Persian: بندان) (Note: Also romanized as Bandān) is a village in Ali Jamal Rural District of the Central District in Boshruyeh County, South Khorasan province, Iran.

== Demographics ==
=== Population ===
At the time of the 2006 National Census, the village's population was 58 in 18 households, when it was in the former Boshruyeh District of Ferdows County. The following census in 2011 counted 50 people in 20 households, by which time the district had been separated from the county in the establishment of Boshruyeh County. The rural district was transferred to the new Central District. The 2016 census measured the population of the village as 60 people in 22 households.
