= Eshqabad, Boshruyeh =

Village in South Khorasan province, Iran

Eshqabad Persian: عشق اباد
- Village
- Location within Iran
- Coordinates: 34°18′54″N 57°13′53″E
- Country: Iran
- Province: South Khorasan
- County: Boshruyeh
- District: Central
- Rural District: Ali Jamal

Population (2016)
  - Total: 59
- Time zone: UTC+3:30 (IRST)

Eshqabad (Persian: عشق اباد) (Note: Also romanized as ‘Eshqābād) is a village in Ali Jamal Rural District of the Central District in Boshruyeh County, South Khorasan province, Iran.

== Demographics ==
=== Population ===
At the time of the 2006 National Census, the village's population was 56 in 24 households, when it was in the former Boshruyeh District of Ferdows County. The following census in 2011 counted 37 people in 22 households, by which time the district had been separated from the county in the establishment of Boshruyeh County. The rural district was transferred to the new Central District. The 2016 census measured the population of the village as 59 people in 31 households.
