= Khoda Afarid =

Village in South Khorasan province, Iran

Khoda Afarid Persian: خداافريد
- Village
- Location within Iran
- Coordinates: 33°45′14″N 57°12′17″E
- Country: Iran
- Province: South Khorasan
- County: Boshruyeh
- District: Eresk
- Rural District: Raqqeh

Population (2016)
  - Total: 107
- Time zone: UTC+3:30 (IRST)

Khoda Afarid (Persian: خداافريد) (Note: Also romanized as Khodā Āfarīd) is a village in Raqqeh Rural District of Eresk District in Boshruyeh County, South Khorasan province, Iran.

== Demographics ==
=== Population ===
At the time of the 2006 National Census, the village's population was 102 in 30 households, when it was in the former Boshruyeh District of Ferdows County. The following census in 2011 counted 101 people in 30 households, by which time the district had been separated from the county in the establishment of Boshruyeh County. The rural district was transferred to the new Eresk District. The 2016 census measured the population of the village as 107 people in 35 households.
