= Hojjatabad, Eresk =

Village in South Khorasan province, Iran

Hojjatabad Persian: حجت اباد
- Village
- Location within Iran
- Coordinates: 33°43′20″N 57°21′16″E
- Country: Iran
- Province: South Khorasan
- County: Boshruyeh
- District: Eresk
- Rural District: Eresk

Population (2016)
  - Total: 84
- Time zone: UTC+3:30 (IRST)

Hojjatabad (Persian: حجت‌آباد) (Note: Also romanized as Ḩojjatābād) is a village in Eresk Rural District of Eresk District in Boshruyeh County, South Khorasan province, Iran.

== Demographics ==
=== Population ===
At the time of the 2006 National Census, the village's population was 72 in 22 households, when it was in the former Boshruyeh District of Ferdows County. The following census in 2011 counted 96 people in 29 households, by which time the district had been separated from the county in the establishment of Boshruyeh County. The rural district was transferred to the new Eresk District. The 2016 census measured the population of the village as 84 people in 28 households.
