= Kheyrabad, Boshruyeh =

Village in South Khorasan province, Iran

Kheyrabad Persian: خيراباد
- Village
- Location within Iran
- Coordinates: 33°43′39″N 57°23′33″E
- Country: Iran
- Province: South Khorasan
- County: Boshruyeh
- District: Eresk
- Rural District: Eresk

Population (2016)
  - Total: Below reporting threshold
- Time zone: UTC+3:30 (IRST)

Kheyrabad (Persian: خيراباد) (Note: Also romanized as Kheyrābād) is a village in Eresk Rural District of Eresk District in Boshruyeh County, South Khorasan province, Iran.

== Demographics ==
=== Population ===
At the time of the 2006 National Census, the village's population was 16 in five households, when it was in the former Boshruyeh District of Ferdows County. The following census in 2011 counted 20 people in five households, by which time the district had been separated from the county in the establishment of Boshruyeh County. The rural district was transferred to the new Eresk District. The 2016 census measured the population of the village as below the reporting threshold.
