= Nowkhanik =

Village in Raqqeh Rural District

Nowkhanik نوخانيك
- Village
- Location within Iran
- Coordinates: 33°49′14″N 57°17′13″E
- Country: Iran
- Province: South Khorasan
- County: Boshruyeh
- Bakhsh: Eresk
- Rural District: Raqqeh

Population (2006)
  - Total: 44
- Time zone: UTC+3:30 (IRST)
  - Summer (DST): UTC+4:30 (IRDT)

Nowkhanik (Persian: نوخانيك, also Romanized as Nowkhānīk) is a village in Raqqeh Rural District, Eresk District, Boshruyeh County, South Khorasan Province, Iran. At the 2006 census, its population was 44, in 13 families.
