= Honaviyeh =

Village in South Khorasan province, Iran

Honaviyeh Persian: هنويه
- Village
- Location within Iran
- Coordinates: 34°27′49″N 57°16′50″E
- Country: Iran
- Province: South Khorasan
- County: Boshruyeh
- District: Central
- Rural District: Ali Jamal

Population (2016)
  - Total: 29
- Time zone: UTC+3:30 (IRST)

Honaviyeh (Persian: هنويه) (Note: Also romanized as Honavīyeh) is a village in Ali Jamal Rural District of the Central District in Boshruyeh County, South Khorasan province, Iran.

== Demographics ==
=== Population ===
At the time of the 2006 National Census, the village's population was 54 in 21 households, when it was in the former Boshruyeh District of Ferdows County. The following census in 2011 counted 40 people in 12 households, by which time the district had been separated from the county in the establishment of Boshruyeh County. The rural district was transferred to the new Central District. The 2016 census measured the population of the village as 29 people in 14 households.
