= Shahrak-e Emam Khomeyni, South Khorasan =

Village in South Khorasan province, Iran

Shahrak-e Emam Khomeyni Persian: شهرك امام خميني
- Village
- Location within Iran
- Coordinates: 33°57′50″N 57°21′58″E
- Country: Iran
- Province: South Khorasan
- County: Boshruyeh
- District: Central
- Rural District: Ali Jamal

Population (2016)
  - Total: 710
- Time zone: UTC+3:30 (IRST)

Shahrak-e Emam Khomeyni (Persian: شهرك امام خميني) (Note: Also romanized as Shahrak-e Emām Khomeynī; also known as Shahrak-e Mantaẓerīyeh (شهرك منتظريه)) is a village in Ali Jamal Rural District of the Central District in Boshruyeh County, South Khorasan province, Iran.

== Demographics ==
=== Population ===
At the time of the 2006 National Census, the village's population was 584 in 162 households, when it was in the former Boshruyeh District of Ferdows County. The following census in 2011 counted 650 people in 208 households, by which time the district had been separated from the county in the establishment of Boshruyeh County. The rural district was transferred to the new Central District. The 2016 census measured the population of the village as 710 people in 224 households.
