= Sarand, Boshruyeh =

Village in South Khorasan province, Iran

Sarand Persian: سرند
- Village
- Location within Iran
- Coordinates: 33°44′52″N 57°13′50″E
- Country: Iran
- Province: South Khorasan
- County: Boshruyeh
- District: Eresk
- Rural District: Raqqeh

Population (2016)
  - Total: 99
- Time zone: UTC+3:30 (IRST)

Sarand (Persian: سرند) (Note: Also romanized as Sorond) is a village in Raqqeh Rural District of Eresk District in Boshruyeh County, South Khorasan province, Iran.

== Demographics ==
=== Population ===
At the time of the 2006 National Census, the village's population was 113 in 31 households, when it was in the former Boshruyeh District of Ferdows County. The following census in 2011 counted 60 people in 21 households, by which time the district had been separated from the county in the establishment of Boshruyeh County. The rural district was transferred to the new Eresk District. The 2016 census measured the population of the village as 99 people in 33 households.
