= Yegi =

Village in South Khorasan province, Iran

Yegi Persian: يگي
- Village
- Location within Iran
- Coordinates: 33°48′04″N 57°14′30″E
- Country: Iran
- Province: South Khorasan
- County: Boshruyeh
- District: Eresk
- Rural District: Raqqeh

Population (2016)
  - Total: 118
- Time zone: UTC+3:30 (IRST)

Yegi (Persian: يگي) (Note: Also romanized as Yegī) is a village in Raqqeh Rural District of Eresk District in Boshruyeh County, South Khorasan province, Iran.

== Demographics ==
=== Population ===
At the time of the 2006 National Census, the village's population was 180 in 41 households, when it was in the former Boshruyeh District of Ferdows County. The following census in 2011 counted 142 people in 39 households, by which time the district had been separated from the county in the establishment of Boshruyeh County. The rural district was transferred to the new Eresk District. The 2016 census measured the population of the village as 118 people in 41 households.
