= Khanik, Eresk =

Khanik خانيك
- Village
- Location within Iran
- Coordinates: 33°48′12″N 57°14′29″E
- Country: Iran
- Province: South Khorasan
- County: Boshruyeh
- Bakhsh: Eresk
- Rural District: Raqqeh

Population (2006)
  - Total: 122
- Time zone: UTC+3:30 (IRST)
  - Summer (DST): UTC+4:30 (IRDT)

Khanik (Persian: خانيك, also Romanized as Khānīk) is a village in Raqqeh Rural District, Eresk District, Boshruyeh County, South Khorasan Province, Iran. At the 2006 census, its population was 122, in 34 families.
