= Jameh Mosque of Raqqeh =

Shi'ite mosque in Raqqeh, South Khorasan, Iran

Jāmeh Mosque of Raqqeh
- مسجد رقه
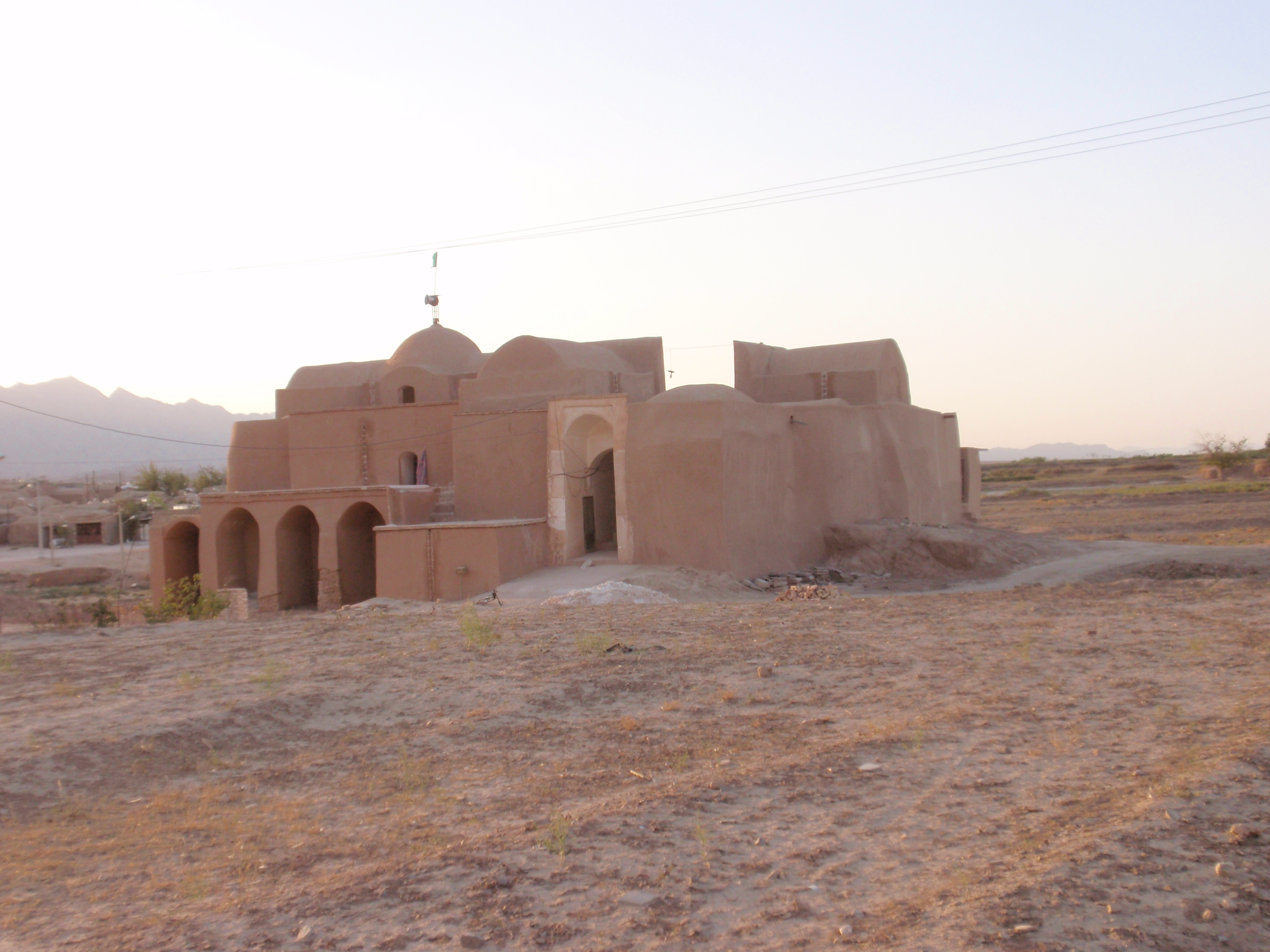
- The mosque in 2015

- Location of the mosque in Iran

Religion
- Affiliation: Shia Islam
- Ecclesiastical or organizational status: Friday mosque
- Status: Active

Location
- Location: Raqqeh, Boshruyeh County, South Khorasan Province
- Country: Iran
- Interactive map of Jāmeh Mosque of Raqqeh
- Coordinates: 33°49′20″N 57°16′27″E

Architecture
- Type: Mosque architecture
- Style: Sejuk; Ilkhanid; Safavid; Qajar
- Completed: 6th and 7th centuries AH

Specifications
- Dome: One (maybe more)
- Materials: Rubble; adobe; cob; lime mortar

Iran National Heritage List
- Official name: Jāmeh Mosque of Raqqeh
- Type: Built
- Designated: 26 June 2005
- Reference no.: 11903
- Conservation organization: Cultural Heritage, Handicrafts and Tourism Organization of Iran

The Jāmeh Mosque of Raqqeh (Persian: مسجد رقه; Arabic: جامع رقة) is a Shi'ite Friday mosque (jāmeh), located in the village of Raqqeh, in the county of Boshruyeh, in the province of South Khorasan, Iran.

The mosque was completed during the 6th and 7th centuries AH, add was added to the Iran National Heritage List on 26 June 2005, administered by the Cultural Heritage, Handicrafts and Tourism Organization of Iran.

== Gallery ==
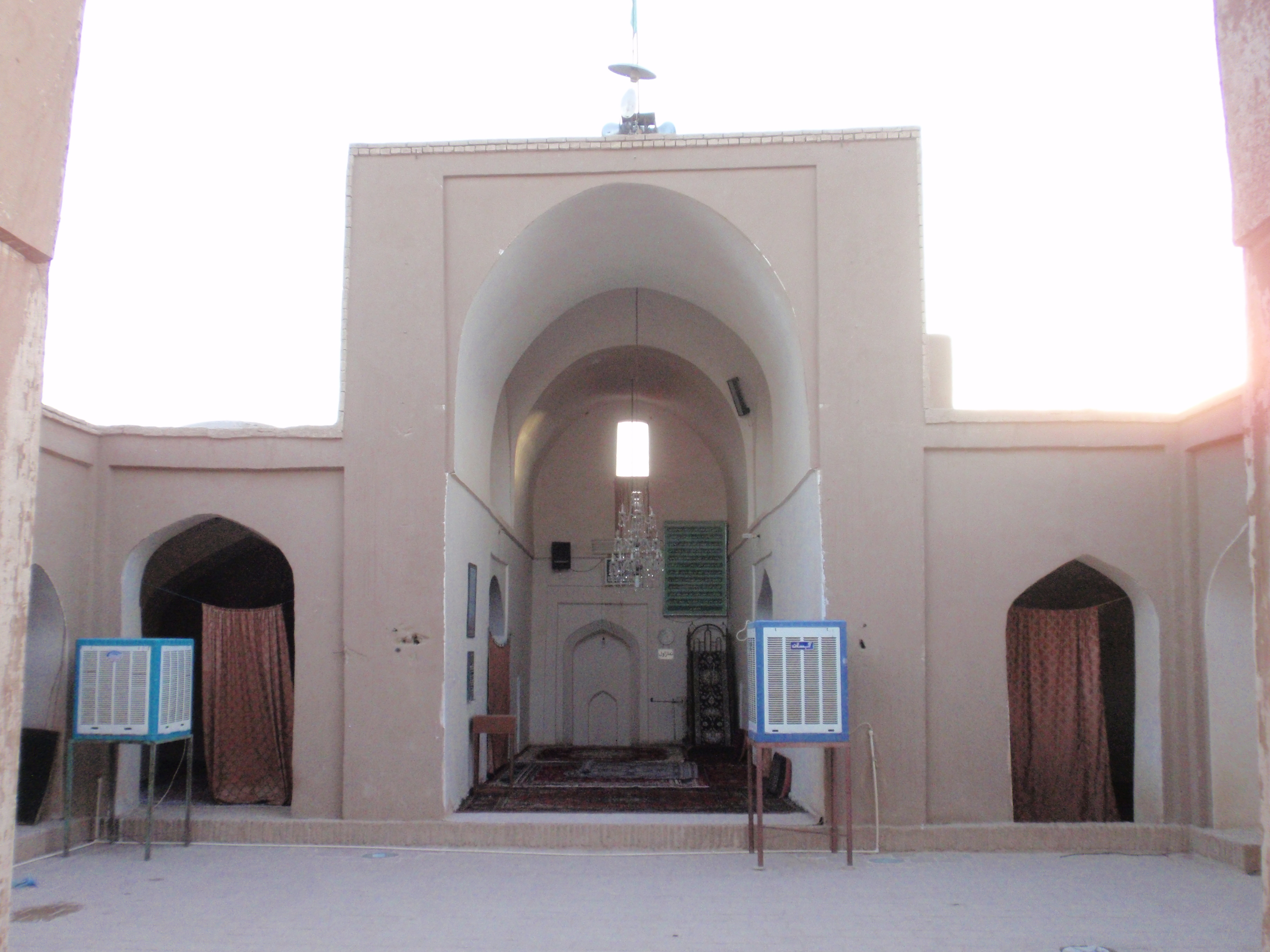

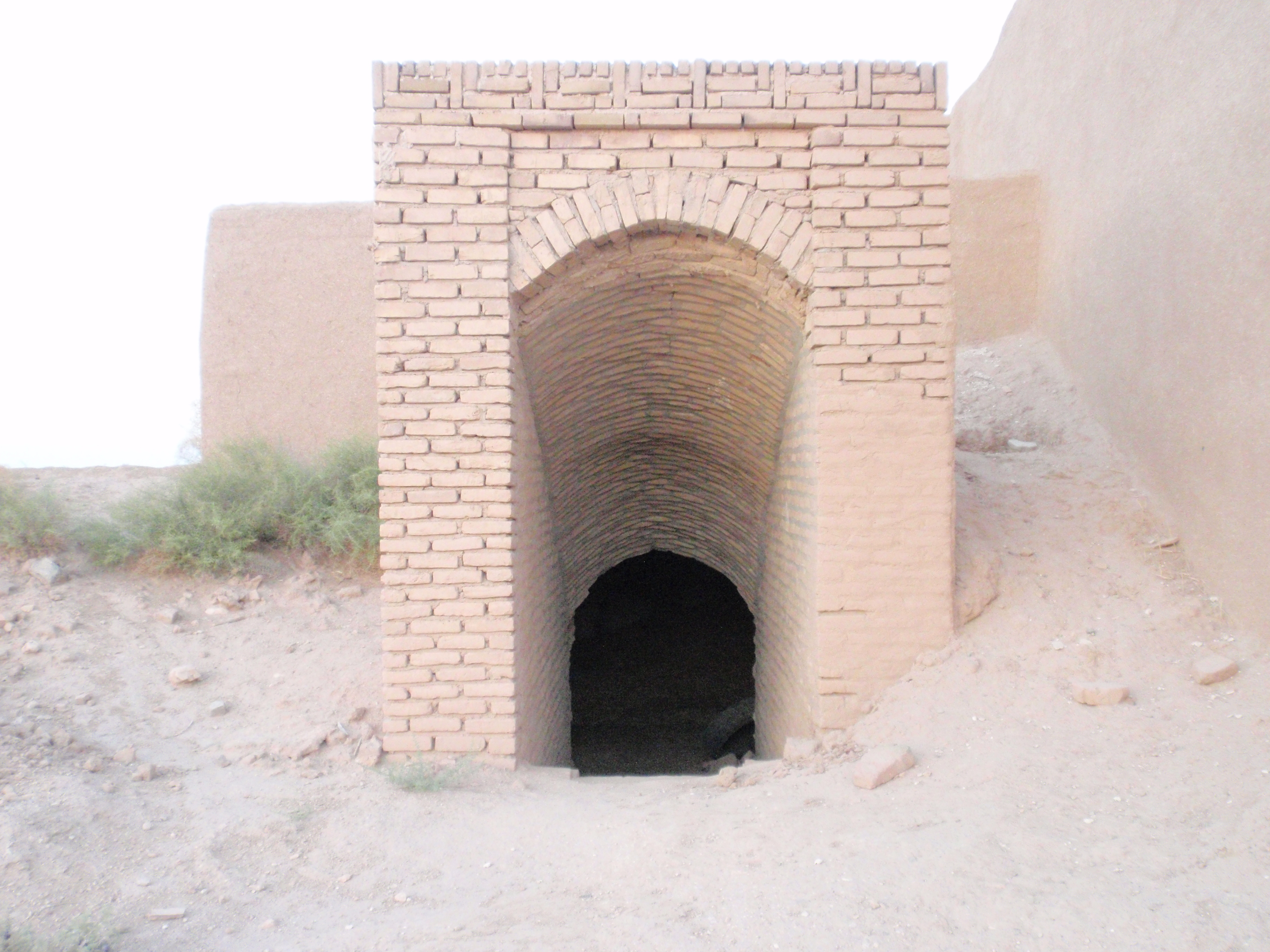

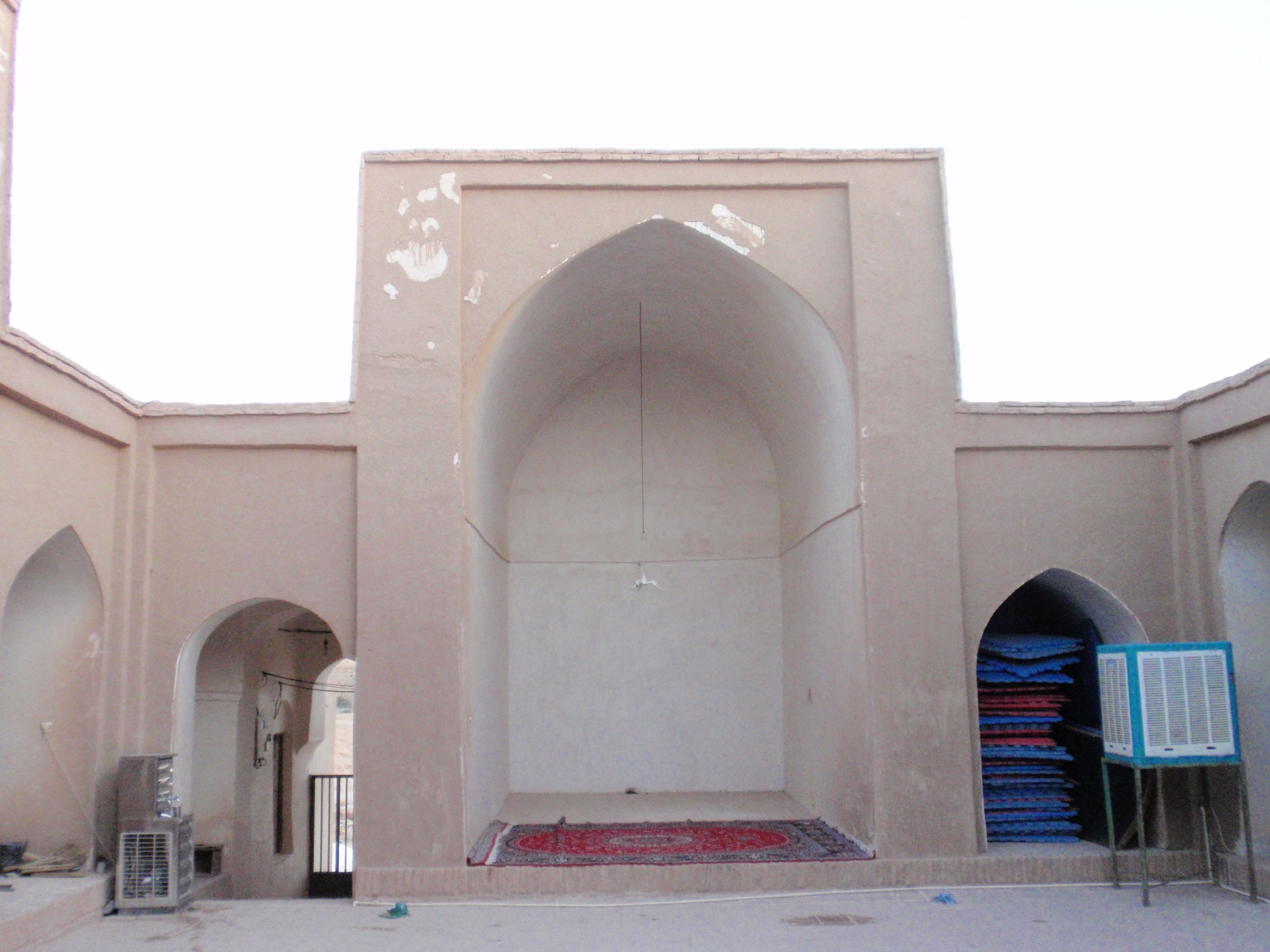

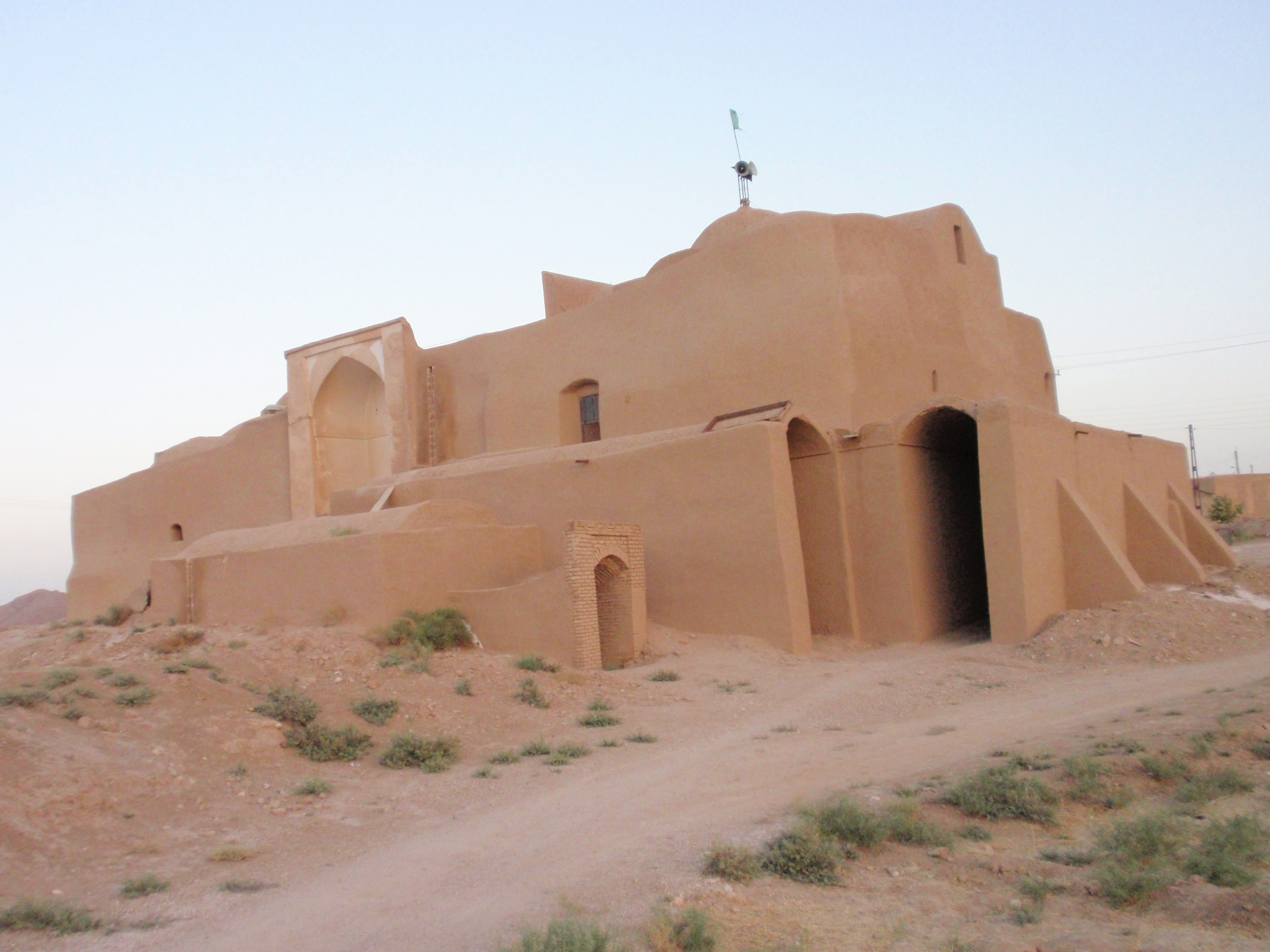

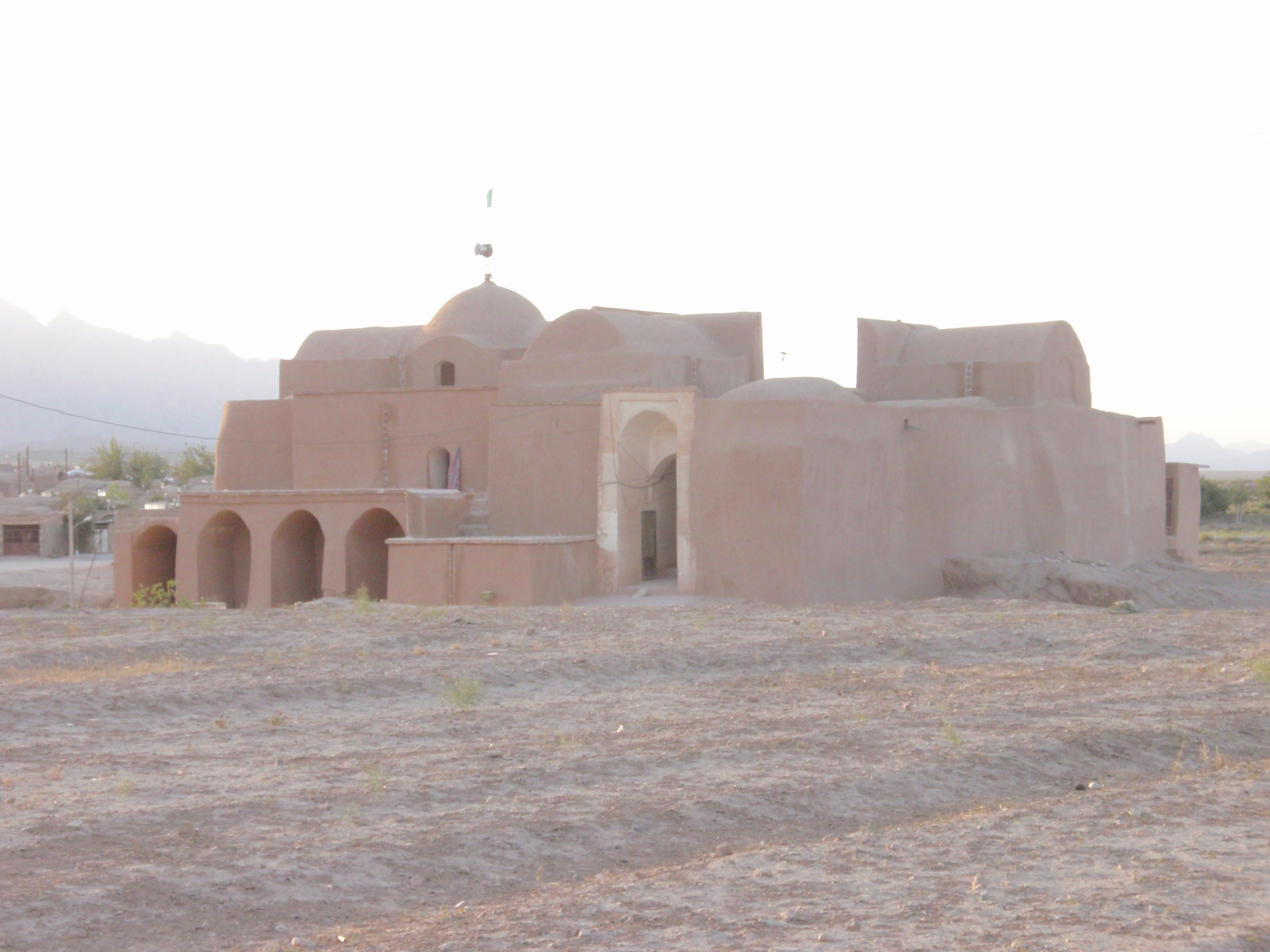

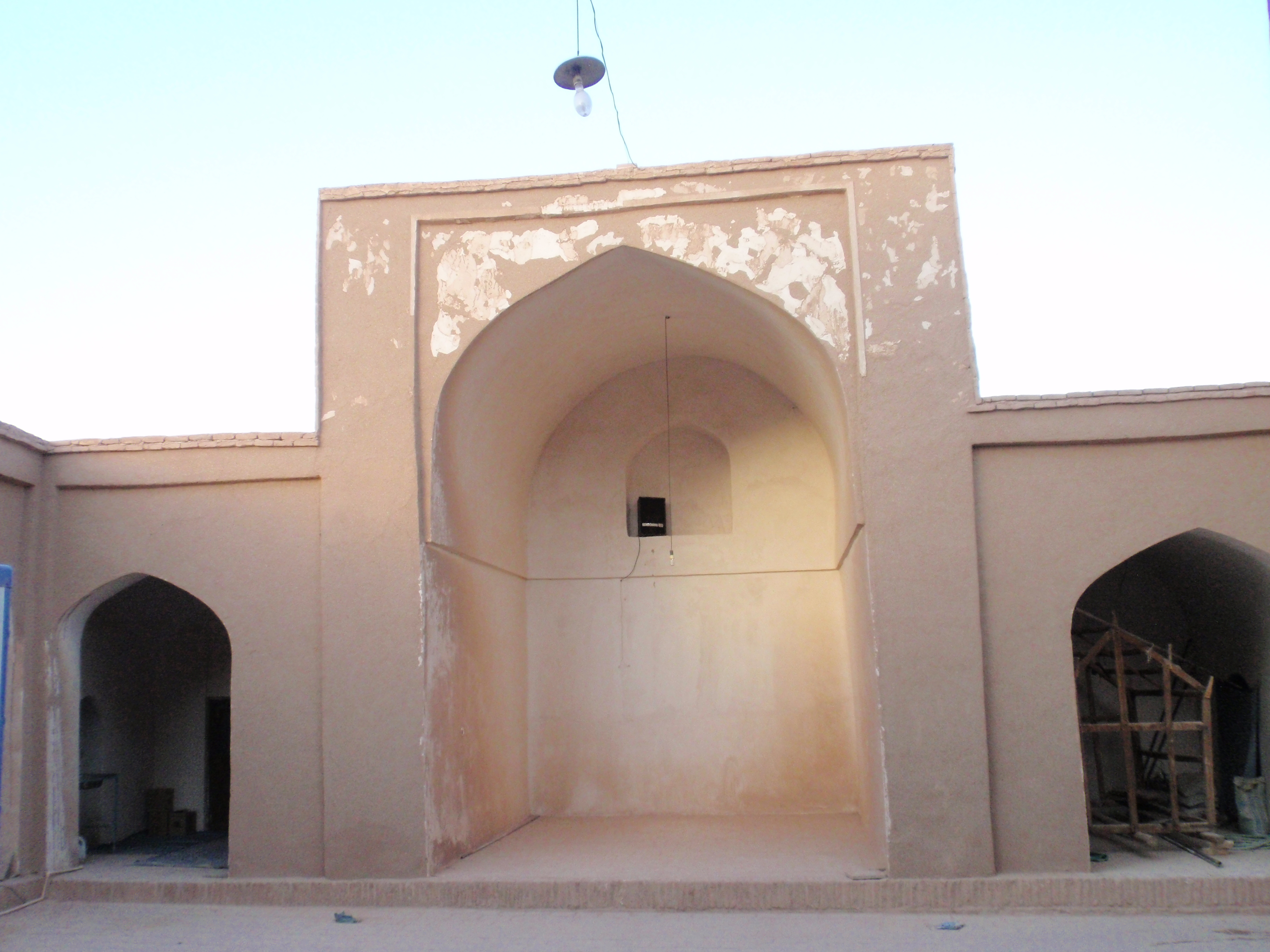

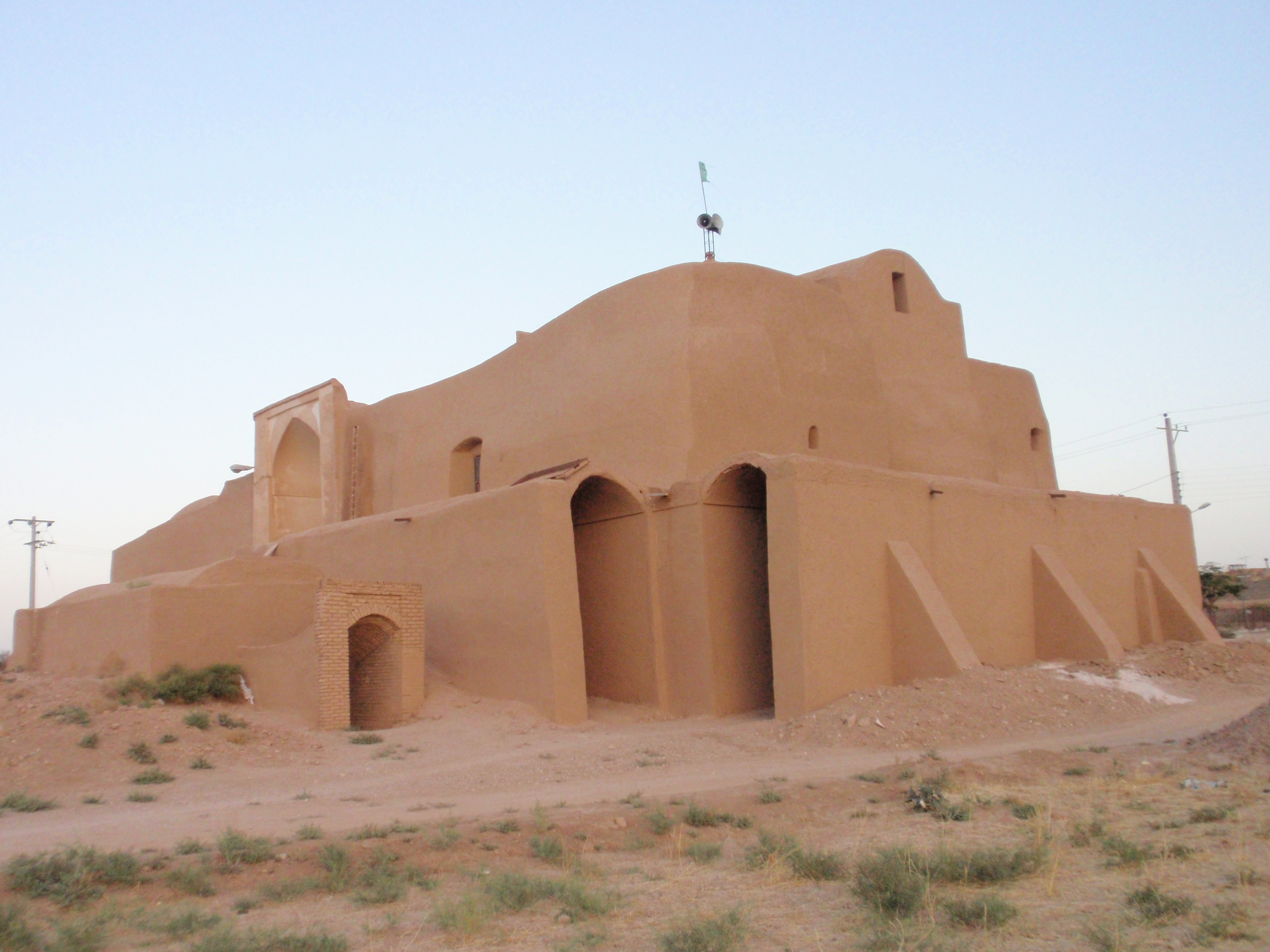

== See also ==
- Shia Islam in Iran
- List of mosques in Iran
