= Aspak =

Aspak may refer to:

- Asbak, Qazvin Province, Iran
- Asfak, South Khorasan Province, Iran
- Esfahak, South Khorasan Province, Iran
