= Neygenan =

Village in South Khorasan province, Iran

Neygenan Persian: نيگنان
- Village
- Location within Iran
- Coordinates: 34°18′07″N 57°21′05″E
- Country: Iran
- Province: South Khorasan
- County: Boshruyeh
- District: Central
- Rural District: Ali Jamal

Population (2016)
  - Total: 289
- Time zone: UTC+3:30 (IRST)

Neygenan (Persian: نيگنان) (Note: Also romanized as Neygenān, Nīganan, and Nīgnān; also known as Nagīneh, Nāgīnu, and Nakīneh) is a village in Ali Jamal Rural District of the Central District in Boshruyeh County, South Khorasan province, Iran.

== Demographics ==
=== Population ===
At the time of the 2006 National Census, the village's population was 331 in 112 households, when it was in the former Boshruyeh District of Ferdows County. The following census in 2011 counted 278 people in 106 households, by which time the district had been separated from the county in the establishment of Boshruyeh County. The rural district was transferred to the new Central District. The 2016 census measured the population of the village as 289 people in 128 households.
