= Ghaniabad, Boshruyeh =

Village in South Khorasan province, Iran

Ghaniabad Persian: غني اباد
- Village
- Location within Iran
- Coordinates: 33°59′56″N 57°20′20″E
- Country: Iran
- Province: South Khorasan
- County: Boshruyeh
- District: Central
- Rural District: Ali Jamal

Population (2016)
  - Total: 1,353
- Time zone: UTC+3:30 (IRST)

Ghaniabad (Persian: غني اباد) (Note: Also romanized as Ghanīābād) is a village in, and the capital of, Ali Jamal Rural District in the Central District of Boshruyeh County, South Khorasan province, Iran.

== Demographics ==
=== Population ===
At the time of the 2006 National Census, the village's population was 1,140 in 269 households, when it was in the former Boshruyeh District of Ferdows County. The following census in 2011 counted 1,298 people in 370 households, by which time the district had been separated from the county in the establishment of Boshruyeh County. The rural district was transferred to the new Central District. The 2016 census measured the population of the village as 1,353 people in 426 households, the most populous in its rural district.
