= Asfak =

Village in South Khorasan province, Iran

Asfak Persian: اصفاك
- Village
- Location within Iran
- Coordinates: 34°02′00″N 57°12′48″E
- Country: Iran
- Province: South Khorasan
- County: Boshruyeh
- District: Central
- Rural District: Ali Jamal

Population (2016)
  - Total: 58
- Time zone: UTC+3:30 (IRST)

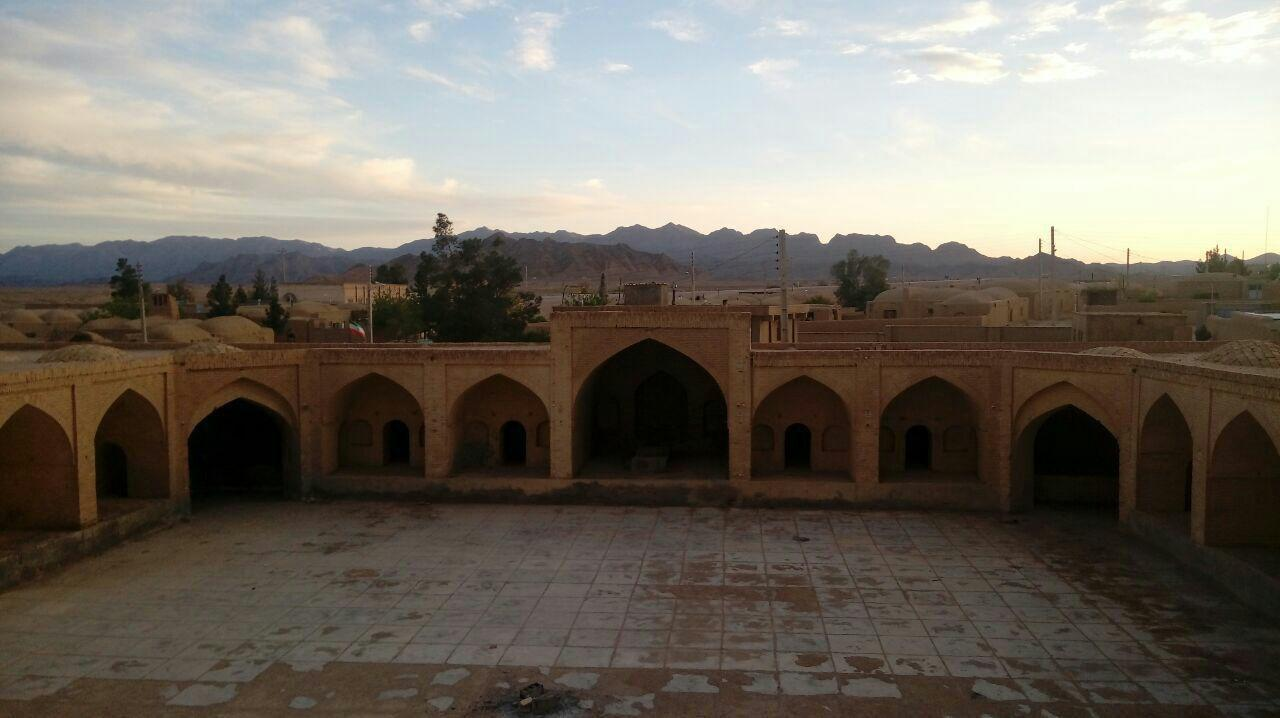
View of the Asfak Caravanserai in South Khorasan province, Iran

Asfak (Persian: اصفاك) (Note: Also romanized as Aşfāk and Eşfāk; also known as Asopak and Aspāk) is a village in Ali Jamal Rural District of the Central District in Boshruyeh County, South Khorasan province, Iran.

== Demographics ==
=== Population ===
At the time of the 2006 National Census, the village's population was 110 in 35 households, when it was in the former Boshruyeh District of Ferdows County. The following census in 2011 counted 74 people in 35 households, by which time the district had been separated from the county in the establishment of Boshruyeh County. The rural district was transferred to the new Central District. The 2016 census measured the population of the village as 58 people in 28 households.
