= Mehdiabad =

Mehdiabad or Mahdiabad or Mihdiabad may refer to:

- Mehdiabad, Azerbaijan
- Mehdiabad, Iran (disambiguation)
- Mehdiabad, Pakistan
