= Mehdiabad, Boshruyeh =

Mediabad مهدي اباد
- Village
- Location within Iran
- Coordinates: 33°44′10″N 57°21′27″E
- Country: Iran
- Province: South Khorasan
- County: Boshruyeh
- Bakhsh: Central
- Rural District: Ali Jamal

Population (2006)
  - Total: 9
- Time zone: UTC+3:30 (IRST)
  - Summer (DST): UTC+4:30 (IRDT)

Mediabad (Persian: مهدي اباد, also Romanized as Mehdīābād and Medīābād) is a village in Ali Jamal Rural District, in the Central District of Boshruyeh County, South Khorasan Province, Iran. At the 2006 census, its population was 9, in 4 families.
