= Korond, South Khorasan =

Village in South Khorasan province, Iran

Korond Persian: كرند
- Village
- Location within Iran
- Coordinates: 33°55′11″N 57°09′34″E
- Country: Iran
- Province: South Khorasan
- County: Boshruyeh
- District: Central
- Rural District: Korond

Population (2016)
  - Total: 593
- Time zone: UTC+3:30 (IRST)

Korond (Persian: كرند) (Note: Also romanized as Kerend) is a village in, and the capital of, Korond Rural District in the Central District of Boshruyeh County, South Khorasan province, Iran.

== Demographics ==
=== Population ===
At the time of the 2006 National Census, the village's population was 549 in 156 households, when it was in Ali Jamal Rural District of the former Boshruyeh District in Ferdows County. The following census in 2011 counted 499 people in 165 households, by which time the district had been separated from the county in the establishment of Boshruyeh County. The rural district was transferred to the new Central District, and Korond was transferred to Korond Rural District created in the same district. The 2016 census measured the population of the village as 593 people in 201 households, the most populous in its rural district.
