= Kerend (disambiguation) =

Kerend is an alternate name of Kerend-e Gharb, a city in Kermanshah Province, Iran.

Kerend or Karand or Kerand (Persian: كرند) may also refer to:

- Kerend, Golestan
- Karand, Semnan
- Kerend, South Khorasan
- Kerend Rural District (disambiguation)
