= Tajark =

Tajark (Persian: تجرك) may refer to:

- Tajark, Hamadan
- Tajark, South Khorasan
- Tajark, Qaen, in South Khorasan Province
