= Mehdiabad-e Yek =

Mehdiabad-e Yek (Persian: مهدي اباد1) may refer to:

- Mehdiabad-e Yek, Chaharmahal and Bakhtiari
- Mehdiabad-e Yek, Kerman
