= Vahed (disambiguation) =

Vahed is a village in Iran. Vahed may also refer to:

== People ==
- Karim Vahed, British entomologist
- Ly Vahed (born 1998), Cambodian footballer
- Negin Mirhasani Vahed, Iranian artist manager
- Abdul-Vahed Niyazov (born 1969), Russian businessman

== Other uses ==
- Mehdiabad-e Vahed, village in Iran
