= Raqqeh =

Village in South Khorasan province, Iran

Raqqeh Persian: رقه
- Village
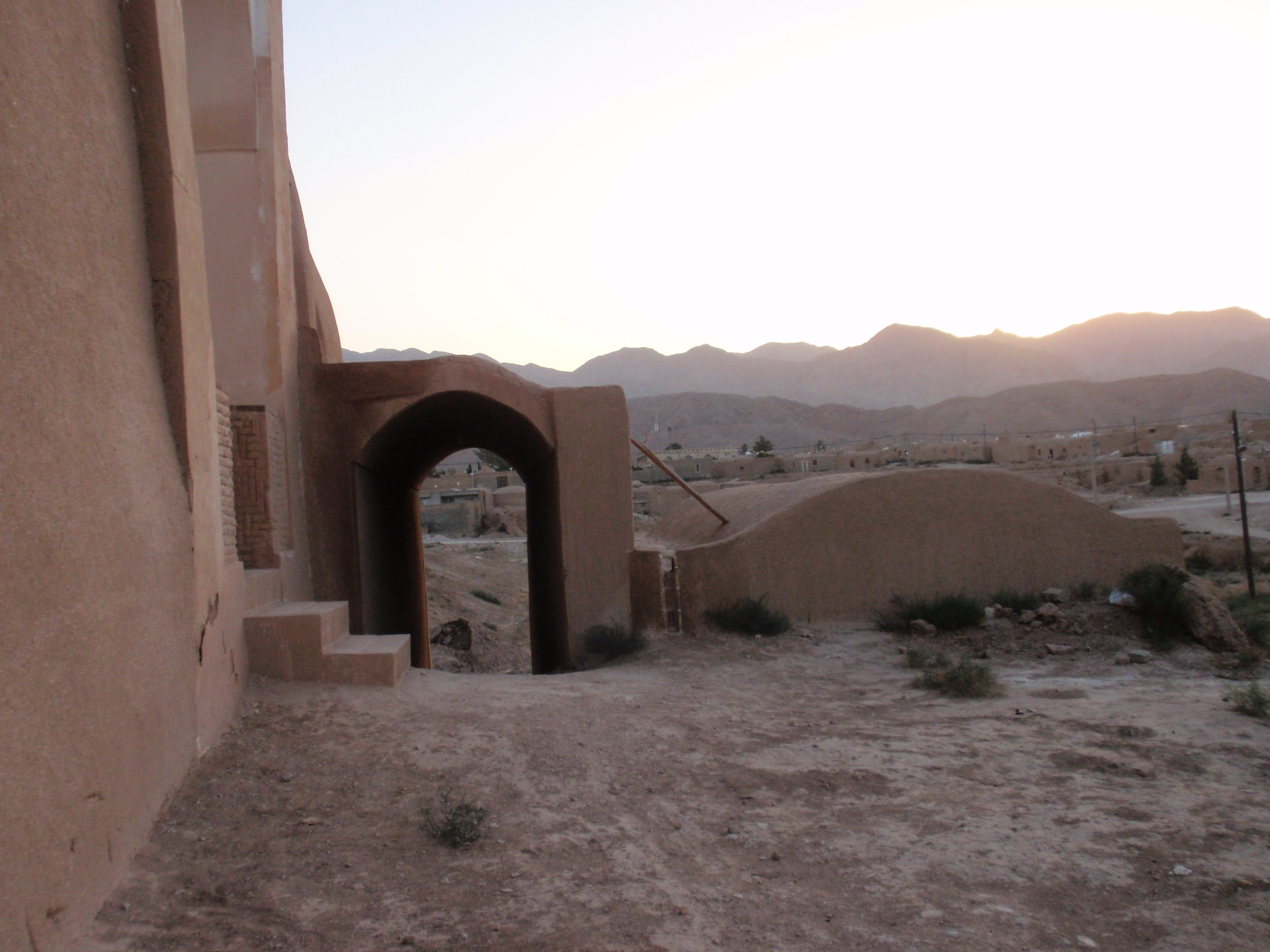
- Grand mosque in the village of Raqqeh

- Location within Iran
- Coordinates: 33°49′17″N 57°16′14″E
- Country: Iran
- Province: South Khorasan
- County: Boshruyeh
- District: Eresk
- Rural District: Raqqeh

Population (2016)
  - Total: 1,096
- Time zone: UTC+3:30 (IRST)

Raqqeh (Persian: رقه) is a village in, and the capital of, Raqqeh Rural District in Eresk District of Boshruyeh County, South Khorasan province, Iran.

== Demographics ==
=== Population ===
At the time of the 2006 National Census, the village's population was 1,005 in 274 households, when it was in the former Boshruyeh District of Ferdows County. The following census in 2011 counted 1,066 people in 312 households, by which time the district had been separated from the county in the establishment of Boshruyeh County. The rural district was transferred to the new Eresk District. The 2016 census measured the population of the village as 1,096 people in 350 households. It was the most populous village in its rural district.
