= Zirak, Iran =

Zirak (Persian: زيرك) may refer to:

- Zirak, Bushehr, Bushehr Province
- Zirak, Birjand, South Khorasan Province
- Zirak, Boshruyeh, South Khorasan Province
