= Howgend Castle =

Castle in South Khorasan Province, Iran

Howgend castle
- قلعه هوگند

General information
- Type: Castle
- Location: Boshruyeh County, Iran

Howgend castle (Persian: قلعه هوگند) is a historical castle located in Boshruyeh County in South Khorasan Province, The longevity of this fortress dates back to the Qajar dynasty.
