= Raqqeh Castle =

Castle in South Khorasan Province, Iran

Raqqeh castle
- قلعه رقه
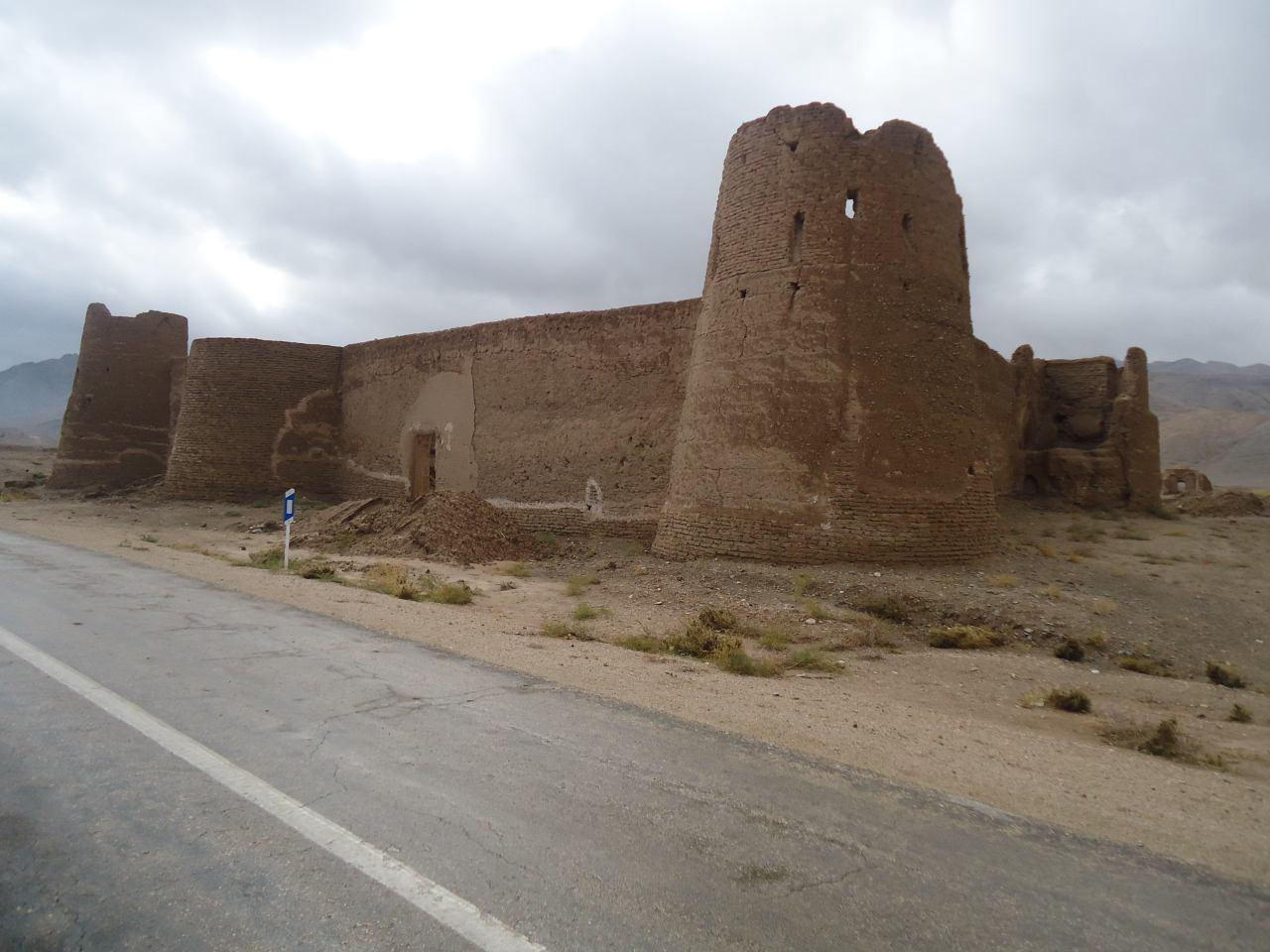

General information
- Type: Castle
- Location: Boshruyeh County, Iran

Raqqeh castle (Persian: قلعه رقه) is a historical castle located in Boshruyeh County in South Khorasan Province, The longevity of this fortress dates back to the Qajar dynasty.
