= Naig =

Naig may refer to:

== People ==
- Mike Naig (born 1978), American politician and farmer
- Neri Naig (born 1985), Filipina actress
- Naig Yusifov (1970–1992), Azerbaijani soldier posthumously awarded the title National Hero of Azerbaijan

== Places ==
- Naig, Iran, a village in South Khorasan Province
- Naig Valley, a vale and hill torrent in Sindh, Pakistan

== NAIG ==
- North American Indigenous Games
