= Korond Rural District (Boshruyeh County) =

Rural district in South Khorasan province, Iran

Korond Rural District Persian: دهستان كرند
- Rural District
- Location within Iran
- Coordinates: 33°54′N 57°12′E
- Country: Iran
- Province: South Khorasan
- County: Boshruyeh
- District: Central
- Established: 2008
- Capital: Korond

Population (2016)
  - Total: 902
- Time zone: UTC+3:30 (IRST)

Korond Rural District (Persian: دهستان كرند) is in the Central District of Boshruyeh County, South Khorasan province, Iran. Its capital is the village of Korond.

== History ==
In 2008, Boshruyeh District was separated from Ferdows County in the establishment of Boshruyeh County, and Korond Rural District was created in the new Central District.

== Demographics ==
=== Population ===
At the time of the 2011 National Census, the rural district's population was 754 inhabitants in 253 households. The 2016 census measured the population of the rural district as 902 in 309 households. The most populous of its 31 villages was Korond, with 593 people.

=== Other villages in the rural district ===
- Ahjuk
- Azizabad
- Beheshtabad
- Hoseynabad
- Jowzardan-e Olya
- Tajark
- Zeroft
