= Eresk =

City in South Khorasan province, Iran

Eresk Persian: ارسک
- City
- Location within Iran
- Coordinates: 33°42′07″N 57°22′26″E
- Country: Iran
- Province: South Khorasan
- County: Boshruyeh
- District: Eresk
- Established as a city: 2010

Population (2016)
  - Total: 2,955
- Time zone: UTC+3:30 (IRST)

Eresk (Persian: ارسک) (Note: Also known as Arishk) is a city in, and the capital of, Eresk District in Boshruyeh County, South Khorasan province, Iran. It also serves as the administrative center for Eresk Rural District.

== Demographics ==
=== Population ===
At the time of the 2006 National Census, Eresk's population was 2,657 in 783 households, when it was a village in Eresk Rural District of the former Boshruyeh District in Ferdows County. The village was converted to a city in 2010. The following census in 2011 counted 2,954 people in 909 households, by which time the district had been separated from the county in the establishment of Boshruyeh County. The rural district was transferred to the new Eresk District. In 2013, the Supreme Council of Urban Planning and Architecture reviewed the Comprehensive and Detailed Plan of the City of Eresk. The 2016 census measured the population of the city as 2,955 people in 980 households.
