= Qasemabad-e Hajji =

Village in Kerman province, Iran

Qasemabad-e Hajji Persian: قاسم آباد حاجي
- Village
- Location within Iran
- Coordinates: 30°26′03″N 56°03′26″E
- Country: Iran
- Province: Kerman
- County: Rafsanjan
- District: Central
- Rural District: Qasemabad

Population (2016)
  - Total: 3,960
- Time zone: UTC+3:30 (IRST)

Qasemabad-e Hajji (Persian: قاسم آباد حاجي) (Note: Also romanized as Qāsemābād-e Ḩājjī) is a village in, and the capital of, Qasemabad Rural District of the Central District of Rafsanjan County, Kerman province, Iran.

== Demographics ==
=== Population ===
At the time of the 2006 National Census, the village's population was 2,737 in 671 households. The following census in 2011 counted 3,231 people in 914 households. The 2016 census measured the population of the village as 3,960 people in 1,212 households. It was the most populous village in its rural district.
