= Mehdiabad-e Sardar =

Mehdiabad-e Sardar مهدي ابادسردار
- Village
- Location within Iran
- Coordinates: 30°24′45″N 56°04′17″E
- Country: Iran
- Province: Kerman
- County: Rafsanjan
- Bakhsh: Central
- Rural District: Qasemabad

Population (2006)
  - Total: 1,170
- Time zone: UTC+3:30 (IRST)
  - Summer (DST): UTC+4:30 (IRDT)

Mehdiabad-e Sardar (Persian: مهدي ابادسردار, also Romanized as Mehdīābād-e Sardār and Mehdi Abad Sardar) is a village in Qasemabad Rooral District, in the Central District of Rafsanjan County, Kerman Province, Iran. At the 2006 census, its population was 1,170, in 291 families.
