= Eresk Rural District =

Rural district in South Khorasan province, Iran

Eresk Rural District Persian: دهستان ارسك
- Rural District
- Location within Iran
- Coordinates: 33°38′N 57°30′E
- Country: Iran
- Province: South Khorasan
- County: Boshruyeh
- District: Eresk
- Established: 1987
- Capital: Eresk

Population (2016)
  - Total: 620
- Time zone: UTC+3:30 (IRST)

Eresk Rural District (Persian: دهستان ارسك) is in Eresk District of Boshruyeh County, South Khorasan province, Iran. It is administered from the city of Eresk.

== Demographics ==
=== Population ===
At the time of the 2006 National Census, the rural district's population (as a part of the former Boshruyeh District in Ferdows County) was 3,226 in 945 households. There were 611 inhabitants in 185 households at the following census of 2011, by which time the district had been separated from the county in the establishment of Boshruyeh County. The rural district was transferred to the new Eresk District. The 2016 census measured the population of the rural district as 620 in 244 households. The most populous of its 60 villages was Fathabad, with 317 people.

=== Other villages in the rural district ===
- Hojjatabad
- Kheyrabad
