= Mehdiabad-e Aminiyan =

Mehdiabad-e Aminiyan مهدي ابادامينيان
- Village
- Location within Iran
- Coordinates: 30°24′29″N 56°09′21″E
- Country: Iran
- Province: Kerman
- County: Rafsanjan
- Bakhsh: Central
- Rural District: Qasemabad

Population (2006)
  - Total: 48
- Time zone: UTC+3:30 (IRST)
  - Summer (DST): UTC+4:30 (IRDT)

Mehdiabad-e Aminiyan (Persian: مهدي ابادامينيان, also Romanized as Mehdīābād-e Amīnīyān) is a village in Qasemabad Rural District, in the Central District of Rafsanjan County, Kerman Province, Iran. At the 2006 census, its population was 48, in 13 families.
