= Kerend Rural District =

Kerend Rural District or Korond Rural District (Persian: دهستان كرند) may refer to:

- Kerend Rural District (Golestan Province)
- Korond Rural District (Boshruyeh County), South Khorasan province
