= Mehdiabad-e Vahed =

Mehdiabad-e Vahed مهدي ابادواحد Mahdi eghbalee
- Village
- Location within Iran
- Coordinates: 30°25′16″N 56°02′32″E
- Country: Iran
- Province: Kerman
- County: Rafsanjan
- Bakhsh: Central
- Rural District: Qasemabad

Population (2006)
  - Total: 2,673
- Time zone: UTC+3:30 (IRST)
  - Summer (DST): UTC+4:30 (IRDT)

Mehdiabad-e Vahed (Persian: مهدي ابادواحد, also Romanized as Mehdīābād-e Vāḩed; also known as Mehdīābād and Mihdīābād) is a village in Qasemabad Rural District, in the Central District of Rafsanjan County, Kerman Province, Iran. At the 2006 census, its population was 2,673, in 621 families.
