= Mehdiabad, Darab =

Mehdiabad مهدئ اباد
- Village
- Location within Iran
- Coordinates: 28°45′00″N 54°15′00″E
- Country: Iran
- Province: Fars
- County: Darab
- Bakhsh: Central
- Rural District: Paskhan

Population (2006)
  - Total: 570
- Time zone: UTC+3:30 (IRST)
  - Summer (DST): UTC+4:30 (IRDT)

Mehdiabad (Persian: مهدئ اباد, also Romanized as Mehd’iābād) is a village in Paskhan Rural District, in the Central District of Darab County, Fars province, Iran. At the 2006 census, its population was 570, in 135 families.
