= Mehdiabad-e Moaven =

Mehdiabad-e Moaven مهدي ابادمعاون
- Village
- Location within Iran
- Coordinates: 30°31′06″N 56°02′36″E
- Country: Iran
- Province: Kerman
- County: Rafsanjan
- Bakhsh: Central
- Rural District: Azadegan

Population (2006)
  - Total: 203
- Time zone: UTC+3:30 (IRST)
  - Summer (DST): UTC+4:30 (IRDT)

Mehdiabad-e Moaven (Persian: مهدي ابادمعاون, also Romanized as Mehdīābād-e Mo‘āven; also known as Mehdīābād) is a village in Azadegan Rural District, in the Central District of Rafsanjan County, Kerman Province, Iran. At the 2006 census, its population was 203, in 38 families.
