= Mehdiabad-e Kalak Shuran =

Mehdiabad-e Kalak Shuran مهدي ابادكالك شوران
- Village
- Location within Iran
- Coordinates: 32°13′00″N 49°26′00″E
- Country: Iran
- Province: Khuzestan
- County: Lali
- Bakhsh: Hati
- Rural District: Jastun Shah

Population (2006)
  - Total: 94
- Time zone: UTC+3:30 (IRST)
  - Summer (DST): UTC+4:30 (IRDT)

Mehdiabad-e Kalak Shuran (Persian: مهدي ابادكالك شوران, also Romanized as Mehdīābād-e Kālaḵ Shūrān; also known as Mehdīābād) is a village in Jastun Shah Rural District, Hati District, Lali County, Khuzestan Province, Iran. At the 2006 census, its population was 94, in 23 families.
