= Mehdiabad, Ilam =

Mehdiabad مهدي اباد
- Village
- Location within Iran
- Coordinates: 33°36′28″N 46°21′56″E
- Country: Iran
- Province: Ilam
- County: Ilam
- Bakhsh: Central
- Rural District: Keshvari

Population (2006)
  - Total: 1,357
- Time zone: UTC+3:30 (IRST)
  - Summer (DST): UTC+4:30 (IRDT)

Mehdiabad (Persian: مهدي اباد, also Romanized as Mehdīābād) is a village in Keshvari Rural District, in the Central District of Ilam County, Ilam Province, Iran. At the 2006 census, its population was 1,357, in 257 families. The village is populated by Kurds.
