= Mehdiabad-e Sofla =

Village in Kermanshah, Iran

Mehdiabad-e Sofla مهدي ابادسفلي
- Village
- Location within Iran
- Coordinates: 34°04′33″N 47°11′48″E
- Country: Iran
- Province: Kermanshah
- County: Kermanshah
- Bakhsh: Firuzabad
- Rural District: Sar Firuzabad

Population (2006)
  - Total: 217
- Time zone: UTC+3:30 (IRST)
  - Summer (DST): UTC+4:30 (IRDT)

Mehdiabad-e Sofla (Persian: مهدي ابادسفلي, also Romanized as Mehdīābād-e Soflá) is a village in Sar Firuzabad Rural District, Firuzabad District, Kermanshah County, Kermanshah Province, Iran. At the 2006 census, its population was 217, in 44 families.
