= Mehdiabad-e Shur =

Mehdiabad-e Shur مهدي ابادشور
- Village
- Location within Iran
- Coordinates: 30°48′25″N 56°26′15″E
- Country: Iran
- Province: Kerman
- County: Zarand
- Bakhsh: Central
- Rural District: Mohammadabad

Population (2006)
  - Total: 88
- Time zone: UTC+3:30 (IRST)
  - Summer (DST): UTC+4:30 (IRDT)

Mehdiabad-e Shur (Persian: مهدي ابادشور, also Romanized as Mehdīābād-e Shūr; also known as Mehdīābād, Mehdīābād Āb Shūr and Mehdi Abad Hoomeh Zarand) is a village in Mohammadabad Rural District, in the Central District of Zarand County, Kerman Province, Iran. At the 2006 census, its population was 88, in 21 families.
