= Mehdiabad, Birjand =

Mehdiabad مهدي اباد
- Village
- Location within Iran
- Coordinates: 32°49′13″N 59°28′59″E
- Country: Iran
- Province: South Khorasan
- County: Birjand
- Bakhsh: Central
- Rural District: Baqeran

Population (2006)
  - Total: 131
- Time zone: UTC+3:30 (IRST)
  - Summer (DST): UTC+4:30 (IRDT)

Mehdiabad (Persian: مهدي اباد, also Romanized as Mehdīābād) is a village in Baqeran Rural District, in the Central District of Birjand County, South Khorasan Province, Iran. At the 2006 census, its population was 131, in 30 families.
