= Mehdiabad, Tus =

Mehdiabad مهدي اباد
- Village
- Location within Iran
- Coordinates: 36°22′02″N 59°33′00″E
- Country: Iran
- Province: Razavi Khorasan
- County: Mashhad
- Bakhsh: Central
- Rural District: Tus

Population (2006)
  - Total: 4,866
- Time zone: UTC+3:30 (IRST)
  - Summer (DST): UTC+4:30 (IRDT)

Mehdiabad (Persian: مهدي اباد, also Romanized as Mehdīābād) is a village in Tus Rural District, in the Central District of Mashhad County, Razavi Khorasan Province, Iran. At the 2006 census, its population was 4,866, in 1,266 families.
