= Mehdiabad-e Jalaleh =

Mehdiabad-e Jalaleh مهدي ابادجلاله
- Village
- Location within Iran
- Coordinates: 30°50′52″N 51°13′19″E
- Country: Iran
- Province: Kohgiluyeh and Boyer-Ahmad
- County: Dana
- Bakhsh: Pataveh
- Rural District: Sadat Mahmudi

Population (2006)
  - Total: 357
- Time zone: UTC+3:30 (IRST)
  - Summer (DST): UTC+4:30 (IRDT)

Mehdiabad-e Jalaleh (Persian: مهدي ابادجلاله, also Romanized as Mehdīābād-e Jalāleh; also known as Mehdīābād) is a village in Sadat Mahmudi Rural District, Pataveh District, Dana County, Kohgiluyeh and Boyer-Ahmad Province, Iran. At the 2006 census, its population was 357, in 50 families.
