= Mehdiabad-e Khan Ahmad =

Iranian village

Mehdiabad-e Khan Ahmad مهدئ اباد خان احمد
- Village
- Country: Iran
- Province: Kohgiluyeh and Boyer-Ahmad
- County: Basht
- Bakhsh: Basht
- Rural District: Babuyi

Population (2006)
  - Total: 30
- Time zone: UTC+3:30 (IRST)
  - Summer (DST): UTC+4:30 (IRDT)

Mehdiabad-e Khan Ahmad (Persian: مهدئ اباد خان احمد, also Romanized as Mehdīābād-e Khān Aḩmad) is a village in Babuyi Rural District, Basht District, Basht County, Kohgiluyeh and Boyer-Ahmad Province, Iran. At the 2006 census, its population was 30, in 6 families.
