= Mehdiabad, Shiraz =

Mehdiabad مهدئ اباد
- Village
- Location within Iran
- Coordinates: 29°15′14″N 52°22′55″E
- Country: Iran
- Province: Fars
- County: Shiraz
- Bakhsh: Central
- Rural District: Siyakh Darengun

Population (2006)
  - Total: 156
- Time zone: UTC+3:30 (IRST)
  - Summer (DST): UTC+4:30 (IRDT)

Mehdiabad (Persian: مهدئ اباد, also Romanized as Mehdīābād) is a village in Siyakh Darengun Rural District, in the Central District of Shiraz County, Fars province, Iran. At the 2006 census, its population was 156, in 38 families.
