= Qaleh Now-ye Mehdiabad =

Village in Razavi Khorasan, Iran

Qaleh Now-ye Mehdiabad قلعه نومهدي اباد
- Village
- Location within Iran
- Coordinates: 36°06′46″N 58°56′05″E
- Country: Iran
- Province: Razavi Khorasan
- County: Nishapur
- Bakhsh: Central
- Rural District: Darbqazi

Population (2006)
  - Total: 249
- Time zone: UTC+3:30 (IRST)
  - Summer (DST): UTC+4:30 (IRDT)

Qaleh Now-ye Mehdiabad (Persian: قلعه نومهدي اباد, also Romanized as Qal‘eh Now-ye Mehdīābād; also known as Mahdīābād and Mehdīābād-e Qal‘eh Now) is a village in Darbqazi Rural District, in the Central District of Nishapur County, Razavi Khorasan Province, Iran. At the 2006 census, its population was 249, in 59 families.
