= Mehdiabad, Azerbaijan =

Mehdiabad
- Municipality
- Location within Azerbaijan
- Coordinates: 40°30′02″N 49°51′14″E
- Country: Azerbaijan
- Rayon: Absheron
- Time zone: UTC+4 (AZT)
  - Summer (DST): UTC+5 (AZT)

Mehdiabad is a settlement and municipality in the Absheron Rayon of Azerbaijan. It has a population of 6,616.

== Transport ==
Tram Line planned for this area in the future.
