= Mehdiabad-e Amin =

Mehdiabad-e Amin مهدي اباد امين
- Village
- Location within Iran
- Coordinates: 30°41′50″N 55°30′52″E
- Country: Iran
- Province: Kerman
- County: Anar
- Bakhsh: Central
- Rural District: Bayaz

Population (2006)
  - Total: 177
- Time zone: UTC+3:30 (IRST)
  - Summer (DST): UTC+4:30 (IRDT)

Mehdiabad-e Amin (Persian: مهدي اباد امين, also Romanized as Mehdīābād-e Amīn; also known as Mehdīābād) is a village in Bayaz Rural District, in the Central District of Anar County, Kerman Province, Iran. At the 2006 census, its population was 177, in 42 families.
