= Mehdiabad, Rigan =

Mehdiabad مهدي اباد
- Village
- Location within Iran
- Coordinates: 28°36′24″N 59°04′01″E
- Country: Iran
- Province: Kerman
- County: Rigan
- Bakhsh: Central
- Rural District: Rigan

Population (2006)
  - Total: 1,014
- Time zone: UTC+3:30 (IRST)
  - Summer (DST): UTC+4:30 (IRDT)

Mehdiabad (Persian: مهدي اباد, also Romanized as 'Mehdīābād; also known as Mehdīābād-e ‘Āmerī) is a village in Rigan Rural District, in the Central District of Rigan County, Kerman Province, Iran. At the 2006 census, its population was 1,014, in 234 families.
