= Mehdiabad, Dorudzan =

Mehdiabad مهدي اباد
- Village
- Location within Iran
- Coordinates: 30°13′15″N 52°28′25″E
- Country: Iran
- Province: Fars
- County: Marvdasht
- Bakhsh: Dorudzan
- Rural District: Dorudzan

Population (2006)
  - Total: 250
- Time zone: UTC+3:30 (IRST)
  - Summer (DST): UTC+4:30 (IRDT)

Mehdiabad (Persian: مهدي اباد, also Romanized as Mehdīābād) is a village in Dorudzan Rural District, Dorudzan District, Marvdasht County, Fars province, Iran. At the 2006 census, its population was 250, in 53 families.
