= Tajerg =

Tajerg تجرگ
- Village
- Location within Iran
- Coordinates: 33°40′26″N 58°59′25″E
- Country: Iran
- Province: South Khorasan
- County: Qaen
- Bakhsh: Central
- Rural District: Qaen

Population (2006)
  - Total: 30
- Time zone: UTC+3:30 (IRST)
  - Summer (DST): UTC+4:30 (IRDT)

Tajerg (Persian: تجرگ, also Romanized as Tajarg and Tajark) is a village in Qaen Rural District, in the Central District of Qaen County, South Khorasan Province, Iran. At the 2006 census, its population was 30, in 10 families.
