= Mehdiabad, Sirjan =

Mehdiabad مهدي اباد
- Village
- Location within Iran
- Coordinates: 29°21′43″N 55°58′51″E
- Country: Iran
- Province: Kerman
- County: Sirjan
- Bakhsh: Central
- Rural District: Balvard

Population (2006)
  - Total: 59
- Time zone: UTC+3:30 (IRST)
  - Summer (DST): UTC+4:30 (IRDT)

Mehdiabad (Persian: مهدي اباد, also Romanized as Mehdīābād) is a village in Balvard Rural District, in the Central District of Sirjan County, Kerman Province, Iran. At the 2006 census, its population was 59, in 16 families.
