= Mehdiabad, Saduq =

Mehdiabad مهدی‌آباد
- Village
- Location within Iran
- Coordinates: 32°04′13″N 54°06′30″E
- Country: Iran
- Province: Yazd
- County: Saduq
- Bakhsh: Central
- Rural District: Rostaq

Population (2006)
  - Total: 160
- Time zone: UTC+3:30 (IRST)
  - Summer (DST): UTC+4:30 (IRDT)

Mehdiabad (Persian: مهدی‌آباد, also Romanized as Mehdīābād; also known as Mehdi Abad Rastagh) is a village in Rostaq Rural District, in the Central District of Saduq County, Yazd Province, Iran. At the 2006 census, its population was 160, in 42 families.
