= Asbak =

Asbak اسبك
- Village
- Location within Iran
- Coordinates: 36°30′53″N 49°34′38″E
- Country: Iran
- Province: Qazvin
- County: Qazvin
- Bakhsh: Tarom Sofla
- Rural District: Kuhgir

Population (2006)
  - Total: 35
- Time zone: UTC+3:30 (IRST)
  - Summer (DST): UTC+4:30 (IRDT)

Asbak (Persian: اسبك, also Romanized as Aspak) is a village in Kuhgir Rural District, Tarom Sofla District, Qazvin County, Qazvin Province, Iran. At the 2006 census, its population was 35, in 8 families.
