= Mahdiabad, Hormozgan =

Mahdiabad مَهدی آباد
- village
- Location within Iran
- Coordinates: 27°33′36″N 55°26′43″E
- Country: Iran
- Province: Hormozgan
- County: Bandar Abbas
- Bakhsh: Fin
- Rural District: Fin

Population (2016)
  - Total: 427
- Time zone: UTC+3:30 (IRST)
  - Summer (DST): UTC+4:30 (IRDT)

Mahdiabad (Persian: مَهدی آباد, also Romanized as Mæhdīābād; is a village in Fin Rural District, Fin District, Bandar Abbas County, Hormozgan Province, Iran. At the 2016 census, its population was 427, in 121 families.
