= Mehdiabad-e Yek, Chaharmahal and Bakhtiari =

Mehdiabad-e Yek مهدي اباد1
- Village
- Location within Iran
- Coordinates: 32°18′00″N 50°15′36″E
- Country: Iran
- Province: Chaharmahal and Bakhtiari
- County: Kuhrang
- Bakhsh: Central
- Rural District: Shurab-e Tangazi

Population (2006)
  - Total: 224
- Time zone: UTC+3:30 (IRST)
  - Summer (DST): UTC+4:30 (IRDT)

Mehdiabad-e Yek (Persian: مهدي اباد1, also Romanized as Mehdīābād-e Yek; also known as Mehdiabad) is a village in Shurab-e Tangazi Rural District in the Central District of Kuhrang County, Chaharmahal and Bakhtiari Province, Iran. At the 2006 census, its population was 224 in 43 families. The village is populated by Lurs.
