= Qasemabad Rural District =

Rural district in Kerman province, Iran

Qasemabad Rural District Persian: دهستان قاسم آباد
- Rural District
- Location within Iran
- Coordinates: 30°26′47″N 56°09′03″E
- Country: Iran
- Province: Kerman
- County: Rafsanjan
- District: Central
- Capital: Qasemabad-e Hajji

Population (2016)
  - Total: 23,869
- Time zone: UTC+3:30 (IRST)

Qasemabad Rural District (Persian: دهستان قاسم آباد) is in the Central District of Rafsanjan County, Kerman province, Iran. Its capital is the village of Qasemabad-e Hajji.

== Demographics ==
=== Population ===
At the time of the 2006 National Census, the rural district's population was 17,430 in 4,255 households. There were 21,646 inhabitants in 6,043 households at the following census of 2011. The 2016 census measured the population of the rural district as 23,869 in 7,099 households. The most populous of its 34 villages was Qasemabad-e Hajji, with 3,960 people.
