= Raqqeh Rural District =

Rural district in South Khorasan province, Iran

Raqqeh Rural District Persian: دهستان رقه
- Rural District
- Location within Iran
- Coordinates: 33°45′N 57°15′E
- Country: Iran
- Province: South Khorasan
- County: Boshruyeh
- District: Eresk
- Established: 1987
- Capital: Raqqeh

Population (2016)
  - Total: 2,398
- Time zone: UTC+3:30 (IRST)

Raqqeh Rural District (Persian: دهستان رقه) is in Eresk District of Boshruyeh County, South Khorasan province, Iran. Its capital is the village of Raqqeh.

== Demographics ==
=== Population ===
At the time of the 2006 National Census, the rural district's population (as a part of the former Boshruyeh District in Ferdows County) was 2,429 in 656 households. There were 2,278 inhabitants in 667 households at the following census of 2011, by which time the district had been separated from the county in the establishment of Boshruyeh County. The rural district was transferred to the new Eresk District. The 2016 census measured the population of the rural district as 2,398 in 794 households. The most populous of its 35 villages was Raqqeh, with 1,096 people.

=== Other villages in the rural district ===
- Bagh-e Dehak
- Khoda Afarid
- Majd
- Murdestan
- Sarand
- Yegi
