= Ali Jamal Rural District =

Rural district in South Khorasan province, Iran

Ali Jamal Rural District Persian: دهستان علي جمال
- Rural District
- Location within Iran
- Coordinates: 34°12′N 57°25′E
- Country: Iran
- Province: South Khorasan
- County: Boshruyeh
- District: Central
- Established: 1993
- Capital: Ghaniabad

Population (2016)
  - Total: 2,763
- Time zone: UTC+3:30 (IRST)

Ali Jamal Rural District (Persian: دهستان علي جمال) is in the Central District of Boshruyeh County, South Khorasan province, Iran. Its capital is the village of Ghaniabad.

== Demographics ==
=== Population ===
At the time of the 2006 National Census, the rural district's population (as a part of the former Boshruyeh District in Ferdows County) was 3,612 in 1,001 households. There were 2,768 inhabitants in 884 households at the following census of 2011, by which time the district had been separated from the county in the establishment of Boshruyeh County. The rural district was transferred to the new Central District. The 2016 census measured the population of the rural district as 2,763 in 955 households. The most populous of its 227 villages was Ghaniabad, with 1,353 people.

=== Other villages in the rural district ===
- Asfak
- Bandan
- Eshqabad
- Honaviyeh
- Neygenan
- Shahrak-e Emam Khomeyni
