= Eresk District =

District in South Khorasan province, Iran

Eresk District Persian: بخش ارسک
- District
- Location within Iran
- Coordinates: 33°40′N 57°27′E
- Country: Iran
- Province: South Khorasan
- County: Boshruyeh
- Established: 2008
- Capital: Eresk

Population (2016)
  - Total: 5,973
- Time zone: UTC+3:30 (IRST)

Eresk District (Persian: بخش ارسک) is in Boshruyeh County, South Khorasan province, Iran. Its capital is the city of Eresk.

== History ==
In 2008, Boshruyeh District was separated from Ferdows County in the establishment of Boshruyeh County, which was divided into two districts of two rural districts each, with Boshruyeh as its capital and only city at the time. The village of Eresk was converted to a city in 2010.

== Demographics ==
=== Population ===
At the time of the 2011 National Census, the district's population was 5,843 people in 1,761 households. The 2016 census measured the population of the district as 5,973 inhabitants in 2,018 households.

=== Administrative divisions ===
Eresk District Population
Administrative Divisions	2011	2016
Eresk RD	611	620
Raqqeh RD	2,278	2,398
Eresk (city)	2,954	2,955
Total	5,843	5,973
RD = Rural District
