= Central District (Boshruyeh County) =

District in South Khorasan province, Iran

Central District (Boshruyeh County) Persian: بخش مرکزی شهرستان بشرویه
- District
- Location within Iran
- Coordinates: 34°12′N 57°25′E
- Country: Iran
- Province: South Khorasan
- County: Boshruyeh
- Established: 2008
- Capital: Boshruyeh

Population (2016)
  - Total: 20,091
- Time zone: UTC+3:30 (IRST)

The Central District of Boshruyeh County (Persian: بخش مرکزی شهرستان بشرویه) is in South Khorasan province, Iran. Its capital is the city of Boshruyeh.

== History ==
In 2008, Boshruyeh District was separated from Ferdows County in the establishment of Boshruyeh County, which was divided into two districts of two rural districts each, with Boshruyeh as its capital and only city at the time.

== Demographics ==
=== Population ===
At the time of the 2011 National Census, the district's population was 18,840 people in 5,462 households. The 2016 census measured the population of the district as 20,091 inhabitants in 6,237 households.

=== Administrative divisions ===
Central District (Boshruyeh County) Population
Administrative Divisions	2011	2016
Ali Jamal RD	2,768	2,763
Korond RD	754	902
Boshruyeh (city)	15,318	16,426
Total	18,840	20,091
RD = Rural District
