= Boshruyeh District =

Former district in South Khorasan province, Iran

Boshruyeh District Persian: بخش بشرویه
- Former District
- Location within Iran
- Coordinates: 34°06′N 57°23′E
- Country: Iran
- Province: South Khorasan
- County: Ferdows
- Capital: Boshruyeh

Population (2006)
  - Total: 23,045
- Time zone: UTC+3:30 (IRST)

Boshruyeh District (Persian: بخش بشرویه) is a former administrative division of Ferdows County, South Khorasan province, Iran. Its capital was the city of Boshruyeh.

== History ==
In 2008, the district was separated from the county in the establishment of Boshruyeh County.

== Demographics ==
=== Population ===
At the time of the 2006 National Census, the district's population was 23,045 in 6,240 households.

=== Administrative divisions ===
Boshruyeh District Population
Administrative Divisions	2006
Ali Jamal RD	3,612
Eresk RD	3,226
Raqqeh RD	2,429
Boshruyeh (city)	13,778
Total	23,045
RD = Rural District
