= Boshruyeh County =

County in South Khorasan province, Iran

Boshruyeh County Persian: شهرستان بشرویه
- County
- Location of Boshruyeh County in South Khorasan province (top left, purple)

- Location of South Khorasan province in Iran
- Coordinates: 34°06′N 57°23′E
- Country: Iran
- Province: South Khorasan
- Established: 2008
- Capital: Boshruyeh
- Districts: Central, Eresk

Population (2016)
  - Total: 26,064
- Time zone: UTC+3:30 (IRST)

Boshruyeh County (Persian: شهرستان بشرویه) is in South Khorasan province, Iran. Its capital is the city of Boshruyeh.

== History ==
There are several historical buildings in Boshrouyeh and its surroundings. Based on historical books, the city has existed for at least 700 years. Some of the most famous buildings are the following:

- Qale’ye Dokhtar (Girl's Castle): This citadel is located on top of a mountain in the west of the city. It has been reported that this huge and ancient building is a state edifice from the period of Ismaili governance in this region.
- Hosseinieh Haj Ali Ashraf: This building has Indian architectural features and is used for “religious mourning rites” during the month of Muharram.
- Masjed Miandeh (City-Center Mosque): This is a state edifice from the period of Ismaili governance. The mosque dates back 400 years.
- Saray-e Serke: This ancient and simple house is well known and used for holding religious mourning ceremonies.

In 2008, Boshruyeh District was separated from Ferdows County in the establishment of Boshruyeh County, which was divided into two districts of two rural districts each, with Boshruyeh as its capital and only city at the time. The village of Eresk was converted to a city in 2010.

== Demographics ==
=== Population ===
At the time of the 2011 census, the county's population was 24,683 people in 7,200 households. The 2016 census measured the population of the county as 26,064 in 8,255 households.

=== Administrative divisions ===
Boshruyeh County's population history and administrative structure over two consecutive censuses are shown in the following table.

Boshruyeh County Population
Administrative Divisions	2011	2016
Central District	18,840	20,091
Ali Jamal RD	2,768	2,763
Korond RD	754	902
Boshruyeh (city)	15,318	16,426
Eresk District	5,843	5,973
Eresk RD	611	620
Raqqeh RD	2,278	2,398
Eresk (city)	2,954	2,955
Total	24,683	26,064
RD = Rural District

== See also ==
Media related to Boshruyeh County at Wikimedia Commons
