= Rahimabad =

Rahimabad (Persian: رحیم‌ آباد) may refer to:

== Iran ==
=== Chaharmahal and Bakhtiari Province ===
- Rahimabad, Kiar, a village in Kiar County
- Rahimabad, Lordegan, a village in Lordegan County

=== Fars Province ===
- Rahimabad, Arsanjan, a village in Arsanjan County
- Rahimabad, Fasa, a village in Fasa County
- Rahimabad, Neyriz, a village in Neyriz County
- Rahimabad, Pasargad, a village in Pasargad County

=== Gilan Province ===
- Rahimabad, Iran, a city in Gilan Province, Iran
- Rahimabad, Lahijan, a village in Lahijan County
- Rahimabad District, an administrative subdivision of Gilan Province, Iran
- Rahimabad Rural District, an administrative subdivision of Gilan Province, Iran

=== Golestan Province ===
- Rahimabad, Golestan, a village in Azadshahr County

=== Hamadan Province ===
- Rahimabad, Hamadan, a village in Hamadan County

=== Hormozgan Province ===
- Rahimabad, Hormozgan, a village in Hajjiabad County

=== Isfahan Province ===
- Rahimabad, Falavarjan, a village in Falavarjan County
- Rahimabad, Isfahan, a village in Isfahan County
- Rahimabad, Baraan-e Shomali, a village in Isfahan County

=== Kerman Province ===
- Rahimabad, Arzuiyeh, a village in Arzuiyeh County
- Rahimabad-e Mowtowr Hoseyn Hatami, a village in Arzuiyeh County
- Rahimabad, Chatrud, a village in Kerman County
- Rahimabad, Rafsanjan, a village in Rafsanjan County

=== Kermanshah Province ===
- Rahimabad, Dorudfaraman, a village in Kermanshah County
- Rahimabad, Miyan Darband, a village in Kermanshah County
- Rahimabad-e Olya, a village in Kermanshah County
- Rahimabad-e Sofla, a village in Kermanshah County

=== Khuzestan Province ===
- Rahimabad, Khuzestan, a village in Andika County

=== Kurdistan Province ===
- Rahimabad, Kurdistan, a village in Saqqez County

=== Lorestan Province ===
- Rahimabad, Borujerd, a village in Lorestan Province, Iran
- Rahimabad, Pol-e Dokhtar, a village in Lorestan Province, Iran
- Rahimabad, alternate name of Shirvan, Lorestan, a village in Lorestan Province, Iran
- Rahimabad 1, a village in Lorestan Province, Iran
- Rahimabad 2, a village in Lorestan Province, Iran
- Rahimabad 3, a village in Lorestan Province, Iran

=== Markazi Province ===
- Rahimabad, former name of Parandak, a city in Markazi Province, Iran

=== North Khorasan Province ===
- Rahimabad, Esfarayen, a village in Esfarayen County, North Khorasan Province, Iran
- Rahimabad, Shirvan, a village in Shirvan County, North Khorasan Province, Iran

=== Qazvin Province ===
- Rahimabad, Buin Zahra, a village in Qazvin Province, Iran
- Rahimabad, Takestan, a village in Qazvin Province, Iran

=== Razavi Khorasan Province ===
- Rahimabad, Darbqazi, a village in Nishapur County
- Rahimabad, Rivand, a village in Nishapur County
- Rahimabad (Kuhsabad), Rivand, a village in Nishapur County
- Rahimabad, Torbat-e Jam, a village in Torbat-e Jam County
- Rahimabad, Salehabad, a village in Torbat-e Jam County

=== Sistan and Baluchestan Province ===
- Rahimabad, Khash, a village in Khash County

=== South Khorasan Province ===
- Rahimabad, South Khorasan, a village in Tabas County
- Rahimabad-e Lanu, a village in South Khorasan Province, Iran

=== Tehran Province ===
- Rahimabad, Tehran, a village in Tehran Province, Iran

=== West Azerbaijan Province ===
- Rahimabad, Urmia, a village in Urmia County
- Rahimabad, Nazlu, a village in Urmia County

=== Yazd Province ===
- Rahimabad, Abarkuh, a village in Abarkuh County
- Rahimabad, Behabad, a village in Behabad County
- Rahimabad, Garizat, a village in Taft County

== Pakistan ==
- Rahimabad, Gilgit-Baltistan, a hill station in Nagar district, Gilgit-Baltistan
- Rahimabad, Punjab, Pakistan, a village in Rahim Yar Khan District, Punjab
- Rahimabad, Swat, a union council in Swat District, Khyber Pakhtunkhwa

== See also ==
- Rahimpur, a village in Punjab, India
- Rahimpur village, Khagaria, a village in Khagaria district, Bihar, India
- Rahimpur Bishdhan, a village in Uttar Pradesh, India
