= Hamidabad =

Hamidabad (Persian: حميداباد) may refer to:

- Hamidabad, Ardabil
- Hamidabad, Chaharmahal and Bakhtiari
- Hamidabad, Pasargad, Fars Province
- Hamidabad, Sepidan, Fars Province
- Hamidabad, Anbarabad, Kerman Province
- Hamidabad, Rafsanjan, Kerman Province
- Hamidabad, Rigan, Kerman Province
- Hamidabad, Sirjan, Kerman Province
- Hamidabad, Omidiyeh, Khuzestan Province
- Hamidabad, Shush, Khuzestan Province
- Hamidabad, Mazandaran
- Hamidabad, Qazvin
- Hamidabad, Takestan, Qazvin
- Hamidabad, Razavi Khorasan
- Hamidabad, Dalgan, Sistan and Baluchestan Province
- Hamidabad, Tehran
