= Hemmatabad, Pasargad =

Hemmatabad همت اباد
- Village
- Location within Iran
- Coordinates: 30°05′39″N 53°00′32″E
- Country: Iran
- Province: Fars
- County: Pasargad
- Bakhsh: Central
- Rural District: Kamin

Population (2006)
  - Total: 347
- Time zone: UTC+3:30 (IRST)
  - Summer (DST): UTC+4:30 (IRDT)

Hemmatabad (Persian: همت اباد, also Romanized as Hemmatābād; also known as Hemmatābād-e Kamīn) is a village in Kamin Rural District, in the Central District of Pasargad County, Fars province, Iran. At the 2006 census, its population was 347, in 85 families.
