= Dehnow, Pasargad =

Dehnow دهنو
- Village
- Location within Iran
- Coordinates: 30°13′59″N 53°12′18″E
- Country: Iran
- Province: Fars
- County: Pasargad
- Bakhsh: Hakhamanish
- Rural District: Abu ol Verdi

Population (2006)
  - Total: 230
- Time zone: UTC+3:30 (IRST)
  - Summer (DST): UTC+4:30 (IRDT)

Dehnow (Persian: دهنو, also Romanized as Deh-e Now and Deh-i-Nau; also known as Dehnow-e Konjak) is a village in Abu ol Verdi Rural District, Hakhamanish District, Pasargad County, Fars province, Iran. At the 2006 census, its population was 230, in 65 families.
