= Qavamabad, Pasargad =

Qavamabad قوام اباد
- Village
- Location within Iran
- Coordinates: 30°07′09″N 52°58′51″E
- Country: Iran
- Province: Fars
- County: Pasargad
- Bakhsh: Central
- Rural District: Kamin

Population (2006)
  - Total: 857
- Time zone: UTC+3:30 (IRST)
  - Summer (DST): UTC+4:30 (IRDT)

Qavamabad (Persian: قوام اباد, also Romanized as Qavāmābād, Qawwāmābād, and Quvvāmābād) is a village in Kamin Rural District, in the Central District of Pasargad County, Fars province, Iran. At the 2006 census, its population was 857, in 185 families.
