= Vakilabad, Pasargad =

Vakilabad وکیل‌آباد
- Village
- Location within Iran
- Coordinates: 30°05′02″N 53°01′54″E
- Country: Iran
- Province: Fars
- County: Pasargad
- Bakhsh: Central
- Rural District: Kamin

Population (2006)
  - Total: 90
- Time zone: UTC+3:30 (IRST)
  - Summer (DST): UTC+4:30 (IRDT)

Vakilabad (Persian: وکیل‌آباد, also Romanized as Vakīlābād; also known as Makīlābād) is a village in Kamin Rural District, in the Central District of Pasargad County, Fars province, Iran. At the 2006 census, its population was 90, in 26 families.
