= Hoseynabad, Kamin =

Hoseynabad pakuh حسين اباد پاکوه
- ruined village
- Location within Iran
- Coordinates: 30°06′52″N 53°05′11″E
- Country: Iran
- Province: Fars
- County: Pasargad
- Bakhsh: Central
- Rural District: Kamin

Population (2006)
  - Total: 36
- Time zone: UTC+3:30 (IRST)
  - Summer (DST): UTC+4:30 (IRDT)

Hoseynabad (Persian: حسين اباد, also Romanized as Ḩoseynābād; also known as Ḩoseynābād-e Pākūh) is a village in Kamin Rural District, in the Central District of Pasargad County, Fars province, Iran. At the 2006 census, its population was 36, in 11 families.
