= Koturi =

Koturi كتوري
- Village
- Location within Iran
- Coordinates: 29°59′13″N 53°22′15″E
- Country: Iran
- Province: Fars
- County: Pasargad
- Bakhsh: Central
- Rural District: Sarpaniran

Population (2006)
  - Total: 103
- Time zone: UTC+3:30 (IRST)
  - Summer (DST): UTC+4:30 (IRDT)

Koturi (Persian: كتوري, also Romanized as Kotūrī) is a village in Sarpaniran Rural District, in the Central District of Pasargad County, Fars province, Iran. At the 2006 census, its population was 103, in 29 families.
