= Kord-e Shul, Pasargad =

Kord-e Shul كردشول
- Village
- Location within Iran
- Coordinates: 30°11′00″N 53°11′32″E
- Country: Iran
- Province: Fars
- County: Pasargad
- District: Pasargad
- Rural District: Madar Soleyman

Population (2006)
  - Total: 972
- Time zone: UTC+3:30 (IRST)
  - Summer (DST): UTC+4:30 (IRDT)

Kord-e Shul (Persian: كردشول, also Romanized as Kord-e Shūl and Kord Shūl; also known as Kurshūr) is a village in Madar Soleyman Rural District, Hakhamanish District, Pasargad County, Fars province, Iran. At the 2006 census, its population was 972, in 238 families.
