= Ali Resideh =

Ali Resideh علي رسيده
- Village
- Location within Iran
- Coordinates: 30°01′51″N 53°07′11″E
- Country: Iran
- Province: Fars
- County: Pasargad
- Bakhsh: Central
- Rural District: Kamin

Population (2006)
  - Total: 569
- Time zone: UTC+3:30 (IRST)
  - Summer (DST): UTC+4:30 (IRDT)

Ali Resideh (Persian: علي رسيده, also Romanized as 'Alī Resīdeh; also known as 'Alī Sorīdeh) is a village in Kamin Rural District, in the Central District of Pasargad County, Fars province, Iran. At the 2006 census, its population was 569, in 118 families.
