= Hasanabad-e Kamin =

Hasanabad-e Kamin حسن ابادكمين
- Village
- Location within Iran
- Coordinates: 30°02′54″N 53°04′06″E
- Country: Iran
- Province: Fars
- County: Pasargad
- Bakhsh: Central
- Rural District: Kamin

Population (2006)
  - Total: 236
- Time zone: UTC+3:30 (IRST)
  - Summer (DST): UTC+4:30 (IRDT)

Hasanabad-e Kamin (Persian: حسن ابادكمين, also Romanized as Ḩasanābād-e Kamīn; also known as Ḩasanābād) is a village in Kamin Rural District, in the Central District of Pasargad County, Fars province, Iran. At the 2006 census, its population was 236, in 46 families.
