= Abu ol Mehdi =

Abu ol Mehdi ابوالمهدي
- Village
- Location within Iran
- Coordinates: 30°06′44″N 52°56′50″E
- Country: Iran
- Province: Fars
- County: Pasargad
- Bakhsh: Central
- Rural District: Kamin

Population (2006)
  - Total: 131
- Time zone: UTC+3:30 (IRST)
  - Summer (DST): UTC+4:30 (IRDT)

Abu ol Mehdi (Persian: ابوالمهدي, also Romanized as Abū ol Mehdī) is a village in Kamin Rural District, in the Central District of Pasargad County, Fars province, Iran. At the 2006 census, its population was 131, in 32 families.
