= Mobarakabad, Madar-e Soleyman =

Village in Fars province, Iran

Mobarakabad Persian: مبارک‌آباد
- Village
- Location within Iran
- Coordinates: 30°11′43″N 53°09′12″E
- Country: Iran
- Province: Fars
- County: Pasargad
- District: Pasargad
- Rural District: Madar-e Soleyman

Population (2016)
  - Total: 1,204
- Time zone: UTC+3:30 (IRST)

Mobarakabad (Persian: مبارک‌آباد) (Note: Also romanized as Mobārakābād; also known as Mubārakābād) is a village in Madar-e Soleyman Rural District of Pasargad District, (Note: Formerly Hakhamanish District) Pasargad County, Fars province, Iran.

== Demographics ==
=== Population ===
At the time of the 2006 National Census, the village's population was 1,077 in 235 households. The following census in 2011 counted 1,232 people in 322 households. The 2016 census measured the population of the village as 1,204 people in 322 households. It was the most populous village in its rural district.
