= Akbarabad, Pasargad =

Village in Fars province, Iran

Akbarabad Persian: اكبراباد
- Village
- Location within Iran
- Coordinates: 30°06′19″N 53°06′31″E
- Country: Iran
- Province: Fars
- County: Pasargad
- District: Central
- Rural District: Kamin

Population (2016)
  - Total: 1,886
- Time zone: UTC+3:30 (IRST)

Akbarabad (Persian: اكبراباد) (Note: Also romanized as Akbarābād) is a village in Kamin Rural District of the Central District of Pasargad County, Fars province, Iran.

== Demographics ==
=== Population ===
At the time of the 2006 National Census, the village's population was 1,548 in 365 households. The following census in 2011 counted 2,008 people in 551 households. The 2016 census measured the population of the village as 1,886 people in 567 households. It was the most populous village in its rural district.
