= Rahimabad-e Kamin =

Rahimabad-e Kamin رحيم ابادكمين
- Village
- Location within Iran
- Coordinates: 30°02′51″N 53°04′39″E
- Country: Iran
- Province: Fars
- County: Pasargad
- Bakhsh: Central
- Rural District: Kamin

Population (2006)
  - Total: 28
- Time zone: UTC+3:30 (IRST)
  - Summer (DST): UTC+4:30 (IRDT)

Rahimabad-e Kamin (Persian: رحيم ابادكمين, also Romanized as Raḩīmābād-e Kamīn; also known as Raḩīmābād) is a village in Kamin Rural District, in the Central District of Pasargad County, Fars province, Iran. At the 2006 census, its population was 28, in 6 families.
