= Abu ol Verdi =

Village in Fars province, Iran

Abu ol Verdi Persian: ابوالوردي
- Village
- Location within Iran
- Coordinates: 30°12′54″N 53°09′27″E
- Country: Iran
- Province: Fars
- County: Pasargad
- District: Pasargad
- Rural District: Abu ol Verdi

Population (2016)
  - Total: 2,601
- Time zone: UTC+3:30 (IRST)

Abu ol Verdi (Persian: ابوالوردي) (Note: Also romanized as Abū ol Vardī and Abū ol Verdī; also known as Abīverdī and Abowlvardī) is a village in, and the capital of, Abu ol Verdi Rural District of Pasargad District, (Note: Formerly Hakhamanish District) Pasargad County, Fars province, Iran.

== Demographics ==
=== Population ===
At the time of the 2006 National Census, the village's population was 2,221 in 509 households. The following census in 2011 counted 2,285 people in 584 households. The 2016 census measured the population of the village as 2,601 people in 722 households. It was the most populous village in its rural district.
