= Naimabad, Fars =

Village in Fars province, Iran

Naimabad Persian: نعيم اباد
- Village
- Location within Iran
- Coordinates: 30°03′44″N 53°16′42″E
- Country: Iran
- Province: Fars
- County: Pasargad
- District: Central
- Rural District: Sarpaniran

Population (2016)
  - Total: 424
- Time zone: UTC+3:30 (IRST)

Naimabad (Persian: نعيم اباد) (Note: Also romanized as Na‘īmābād) is a village in, and the capital of, Sarpaniran Rural District of the Central District of Pasargad County, Fars province, Iran.

== Demographics ==
=== Population ===
At the time of the 2006 National Census, the village's population was 532 in 130 households. The following census in 2011 counted 558 people in 132 households. The 2016 census measured the population of the village as 424 people in 125 households. It was the most populous village in its rural district.
