= Sheytanabad =

Sheytanabad (Persian: ابادشيطان) may refer to:

- Eslamabad, Urmia
- Rahimabad, Urmia
