= Munger Ganga Bridge =

Bridge in Bihar India

Shri Krishna Setu Bridge
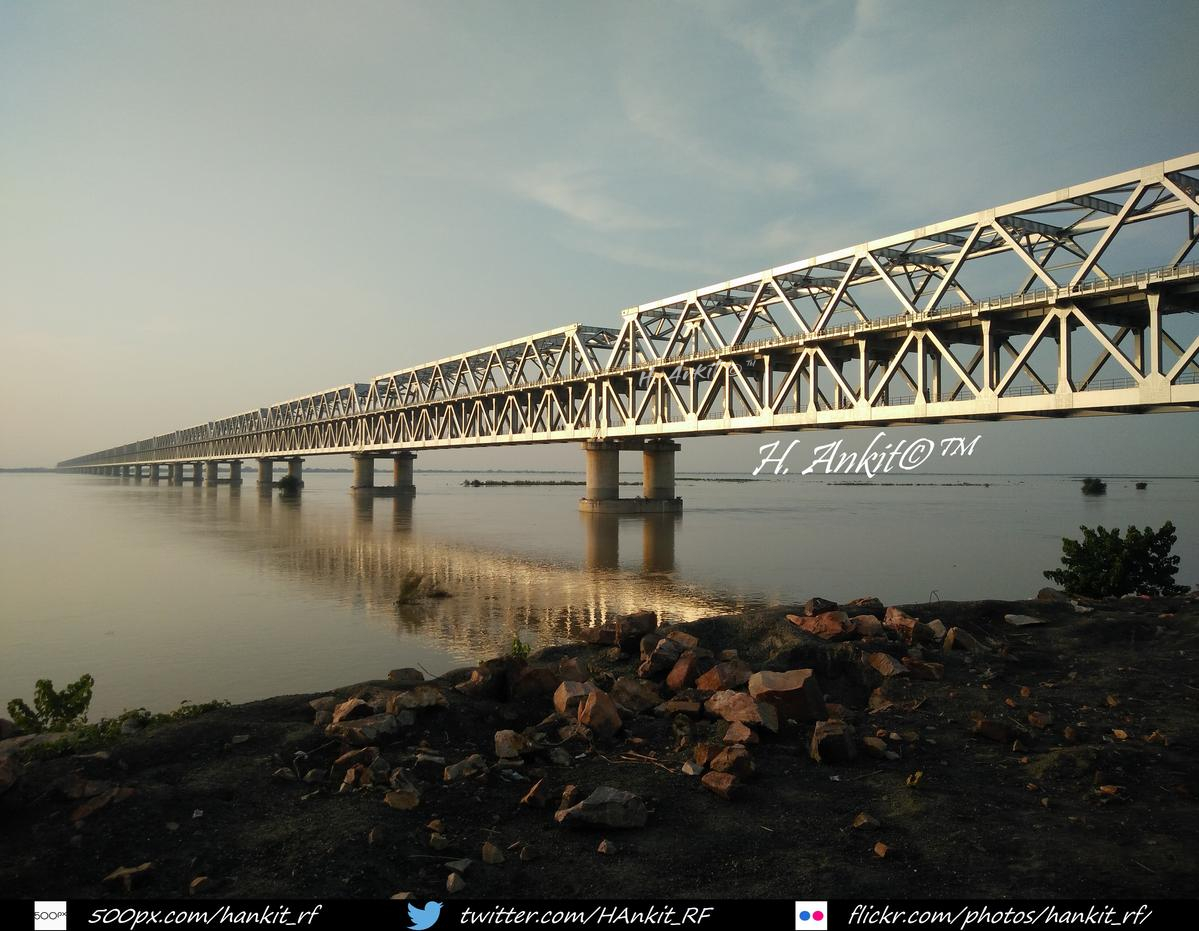
- Srikrishna Setu Munger Ganga Bridge
- Coordinates: 25.3984°N 86.4576°E
- Carries: Rail-Road
- Crosses: Ganges
- Locale: Munger-Begusarai, Munger-Khagaria, NH 33, NH 31, NH 333B
- Official name: Shri krishna Setu

Characteristics
- Design: Warren truss
- Material: Steel
- Total length: 3,750 metres (12,300 ft)
- Width: 12.25 metres (40.2 ft)
- Longest span: 123.9 metres (406 ft)
- No. of spans: 29
- No. of lanes: 2

Rail characteristics
- No. of tracks: 1

History
- Construction start: 2002
- Opened: Rail 11 March 2016, Road 11 Feb 2022

Shri Krishna Setu (Munger Ganga Bridge) NH 333B is a rail-cum-road bridge across the Ganges, at Munger in the Indian state of Bihar and named after first Chief Minister of Bihar Shri Krishna Singh. The bridge connects the Munger-Jamalpur twin cities in Munger District to various districts of North Bihar. Srikrishna Setu Munger Ganga Bridge is the third rail-cum-road bridge over Ganga in Bihar.

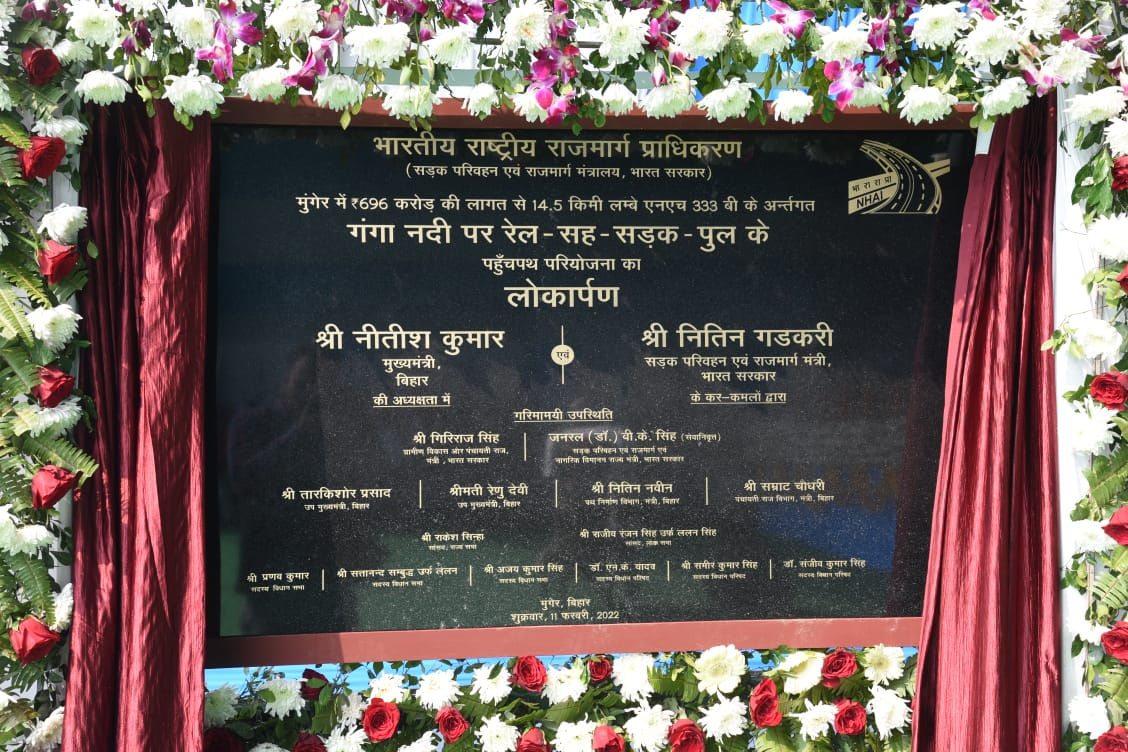

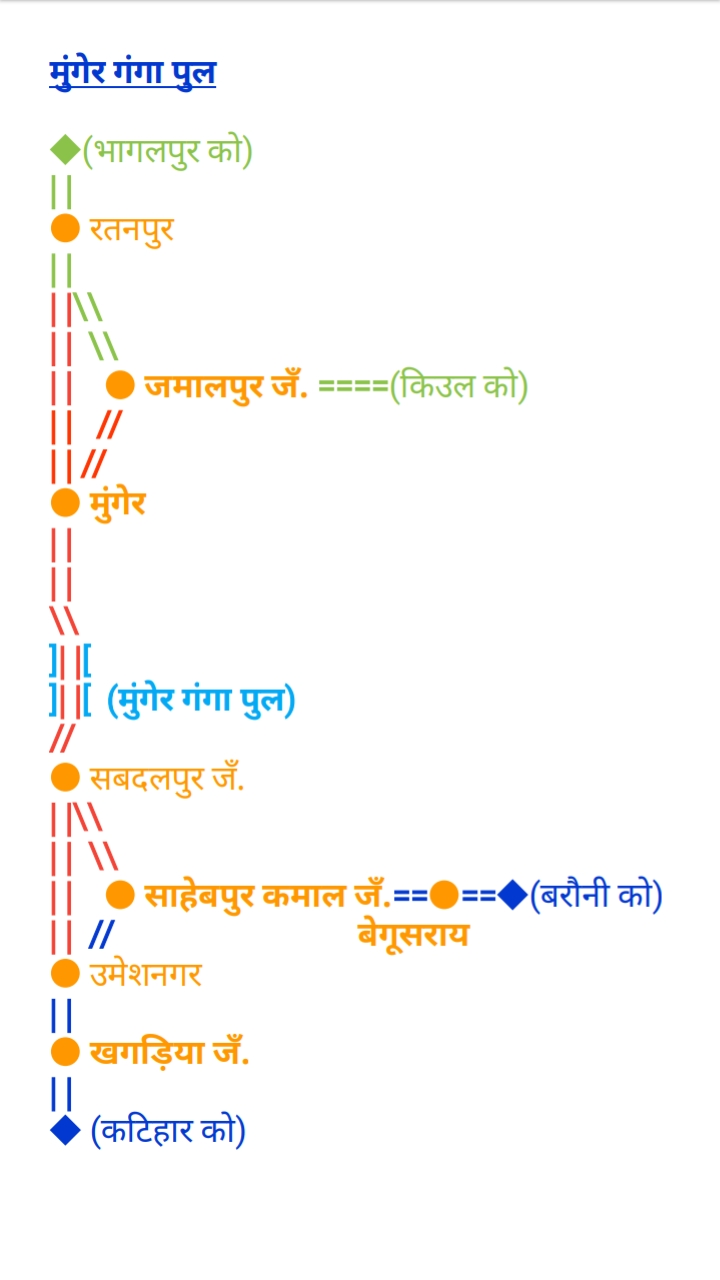
Munger Ganga Bridge Rail Route(Red)

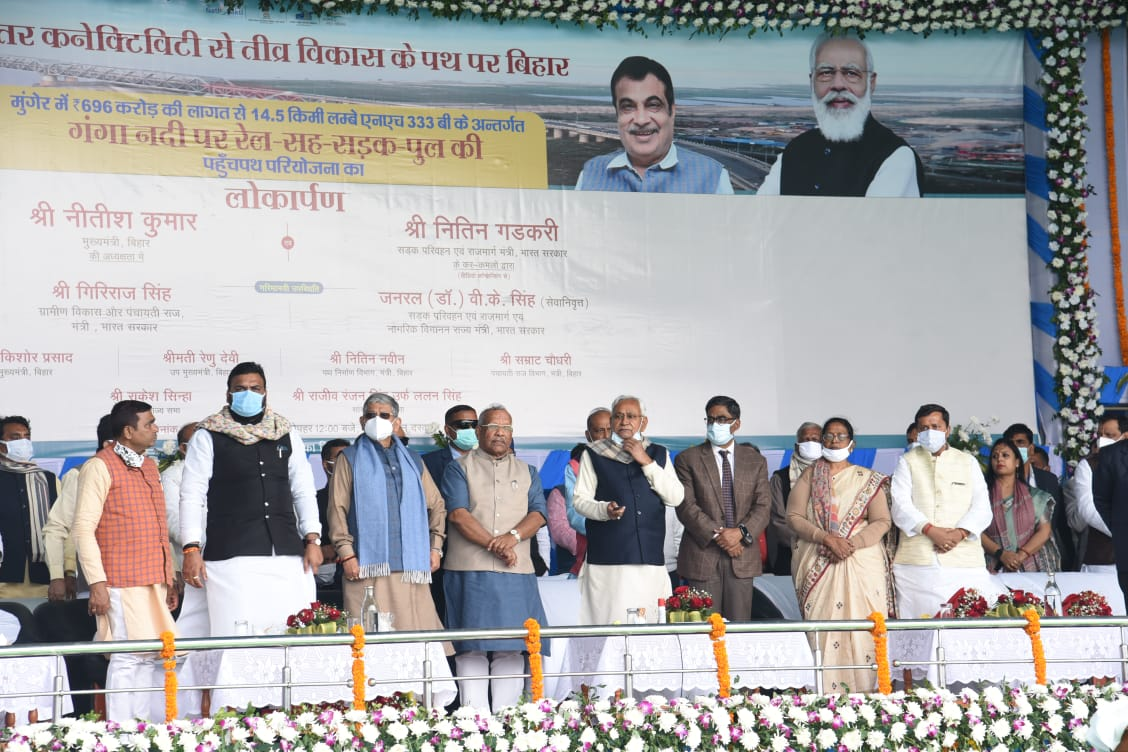

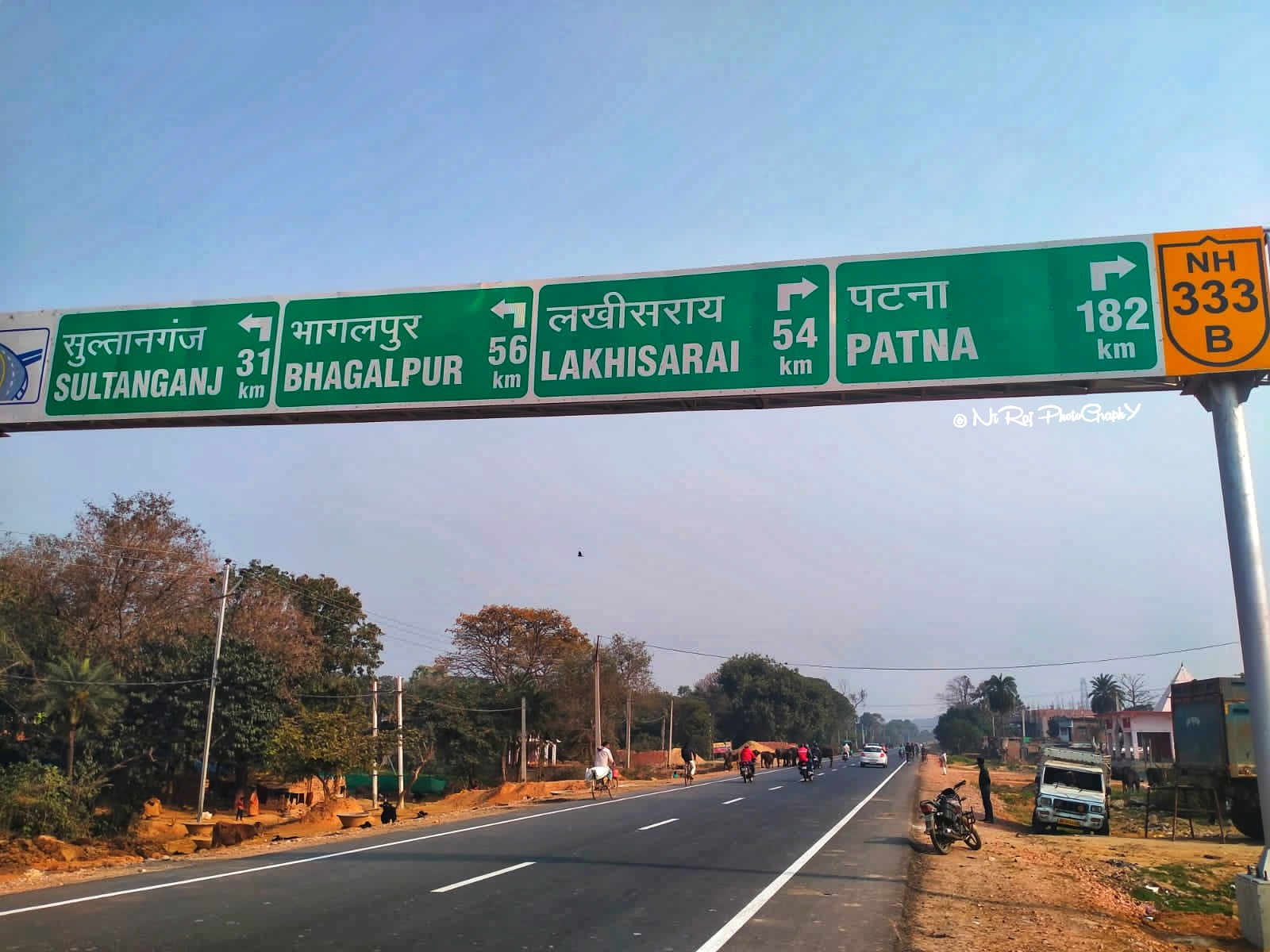
NH – 333B Board in Munger

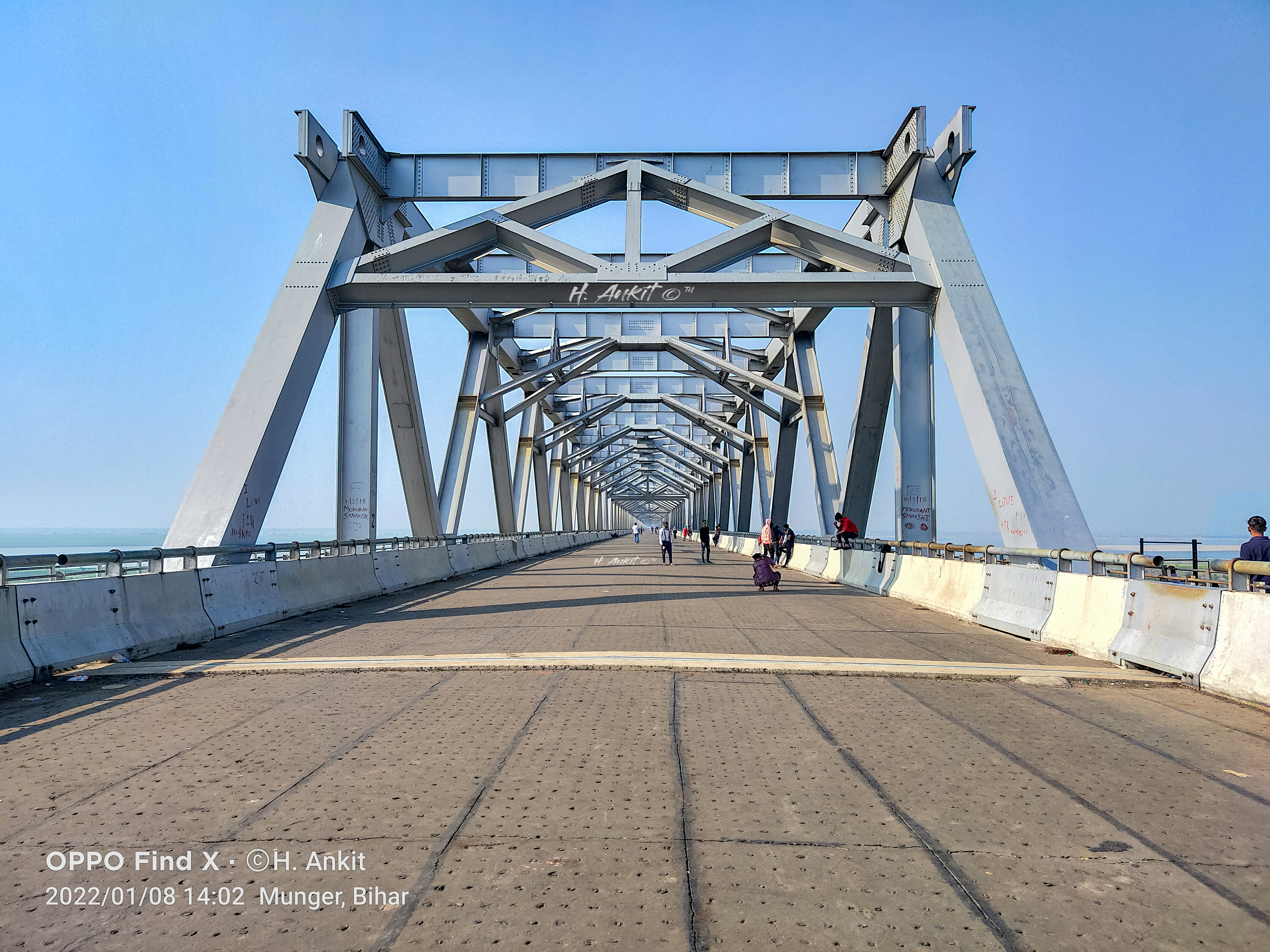
Shri Krishna Setu

The 3.750-kilometre-long (2.330 mi) bridge costing Rs. 9,300 million is located 60 kilometres (37 mi) downstream of the Rajendra Setu near Mokama and 63 kilometres (39 mi) upstream of the Vikramshila Setu at Bhagalpur. The bridge forms a link between NH 33 on the southern side of the Ganges and NH 31 on the northern side of the Ganges. Shrikrishna Setu connects Jamalpur Junction and Ratanpur railway station on the Sahibganj Loop through Munger Railway Station line of Eastern Railway with a new junction namely Sabdalpur Junction on north end of bridge to Sahibpur Kamal Junction and Khagaria Junction on the Barauni-Katihar section of East Central Railway. The Bridge connects districts of Begusarai and Khagaria to the Divisional headquarters Munger city.

== History ==
The bridge was formally opened for freight trains on 12 March 2016 by Prime Minister Narendra Modi. It was opened for passenger trains on 11 April 2016 by Minister of State for Railways, Manoj Sinha, by flagging off Begusarai-Jamalpur DEMU train. In his inaugural speech, the MOS Mr. Manoj Sinha announced that the bridge will be named "Sri Krishna Setu" (श्रीकृष्ण सेतु) in the honour of the great freedom fighter, premier and first Chief Minister of Bihar, Dr. Srikrishna Sinha "Sri Babu".

The bridge was opened to road traffic in February 2022, after the approach roads on the both sides were completed.

== Railway stations ==
Jamalpur-Khagaria and Begusarai lines.

| Station Code | Station Name | Distance from Munger railway station (km) |
|---|---|---|
Jamalpur Bypass (Bhagalpur-Munger route)
| RPUR | Ratanpur | 11 |
On JMP-KGG line
| JMP | Jamalpur | 7 |
| MGR | Munger | 0 |
| SBDP | Sabdalpur | 7.63 |
| UMNR | Umeshnagar | 12.36 |
| KGG | Khagaria | 19.84 |
Different line from Sabdalpur
| SKJ | Sahibpur Kamal | 12.36 |
| BGS | Begusarai | 39.30 |

== Services ==
Multiple train services use the bridge.

- 03450/51 Jamalpur Tilrath Jamalpur DEMU
- 03453/54 Jamalpur Tilrath Jamalpur DEMU
- 03473/74 Jamalpur Khagaria Jamalpur DEMU
- 03475/76 Jamalpur khagaria Jamalpur DEMU
- 15625/26 Agartala Deogarh Agartala Weekly Express
- 05509/10 Saharsa Jamalpur Saharsa MEMU Special
- 09451/52 Gandhidham Bhagalpur Gandhidham Express Special
- 15553/54 Bhagalpur Jaynagar Bhagalpur Special

== See also ==
- List of road–rail bridges
- List of longest bridges above water in India
