= Madar-e-Soleyman =

City in Fars province, Iran

Madar-e-Soleyman Persian: مادر سليمان
- City
- Location within Iran
- Coordinates: 30°11′28″N 53°10′31″E
- Country: Iran
- Province: Fars
- County: Pasargad
- District: Pasargad

Population (2016)
  - Total: 1,546
- Time zone: UTC+3:30 (IRST)

Madar-e-Soleyman (Persian: مادرسليمان) (Note: Also romanized as Mādar Soleymān and Mādar-e Soleymān; also known as Mādar-i-Sulaimān, Takht Mādar-i-Sulaimān, Takht-e Mādar-e Soleymān, and Takht-e Soleymān) is a city in, and the capital of, Pasargad District (Note: Formerly Hakhamanish District) of Pasargad County, Fars province, Iran. It also serves as the administrative center for Madar-e Soleyman Rural District. The name means "mother of Solomon," the Biblical Bathsheba, from the tomb historically reputed to belong to her (known as the Tomb of Cyrus in modern times).

== Demographics ==
=== Population ===
At the time of the 2006 National Census, Madar-e Soleyman's population was 1,633 in 404 households, when it was a village in Madar-e Soleyman Rural District. The following census in 2011 counted 1,822 people in 513 households. The 2016 census measured the population as 1,546 people in 452 households, by which time the village had been elevated to the status of a city.
