= Saadat Shahr =

City in Fars province, Iran

Saadat Shahr Persian: سعادت‌شهر
- City
- Location within Iran
- Coordinates: 30°04′38″N 53°07′58″E
- Country: Iran
- Province: Fars
- County: Pasargad
- District: Central

Population (2016 Census)
  - Total: 17,131
- Time zone: UTC+3:30 (IRST)

Saadat Shahr (Persian: سعادت‌شهر) (Note: Also romanized as Sa‘ādat Shahr and Sa‘ādatshahr) is a city in the Central District of Pasargad County, Fars province, Iran, serving as capital of both the county and the district. Saadat Shahr is located 630 kilometres (390 mi) south of Tehran, the capital of the country, and is an agricultural city.

== Demographics ==
=== Population ===
At the time of the 2006 National Census, the city's population was 15,947 in 3,814 households. The following census in 2011 counted 16,876 people in 4,514 households. The 2016 census measured the population of the city as 17,131 people in 5,021 households.

== Overview ==
The city has gained global attention due to its fascination with astronomy and stargazing. Women in the town sold their jewelry to pay for the town's observatory and telescope, and many of the residents have given part of their salaries for the project. The town's mosque regularly provides astronomy forecasts. On special occasions, the town shuts off its electricity so people could enjoy astronomical events.

In March 2007, excavations in the vicinity of Saadat Shahr revealed a soil dam dating back to the Achaemenid dynastic era.
