= National Highway 333B (India) =

National highway in India

National Highway 333B

Route information
- Length: 17.7 km (11.0 mi)

Major junctions
- South end: Munger
- North end: Khagaria

Location
- Country: India
- States: Bihar
- Primary destinations: Munger

Highway system
- Roads in India; Expressways; National; State; Asian
← NH 33	→ NH 31

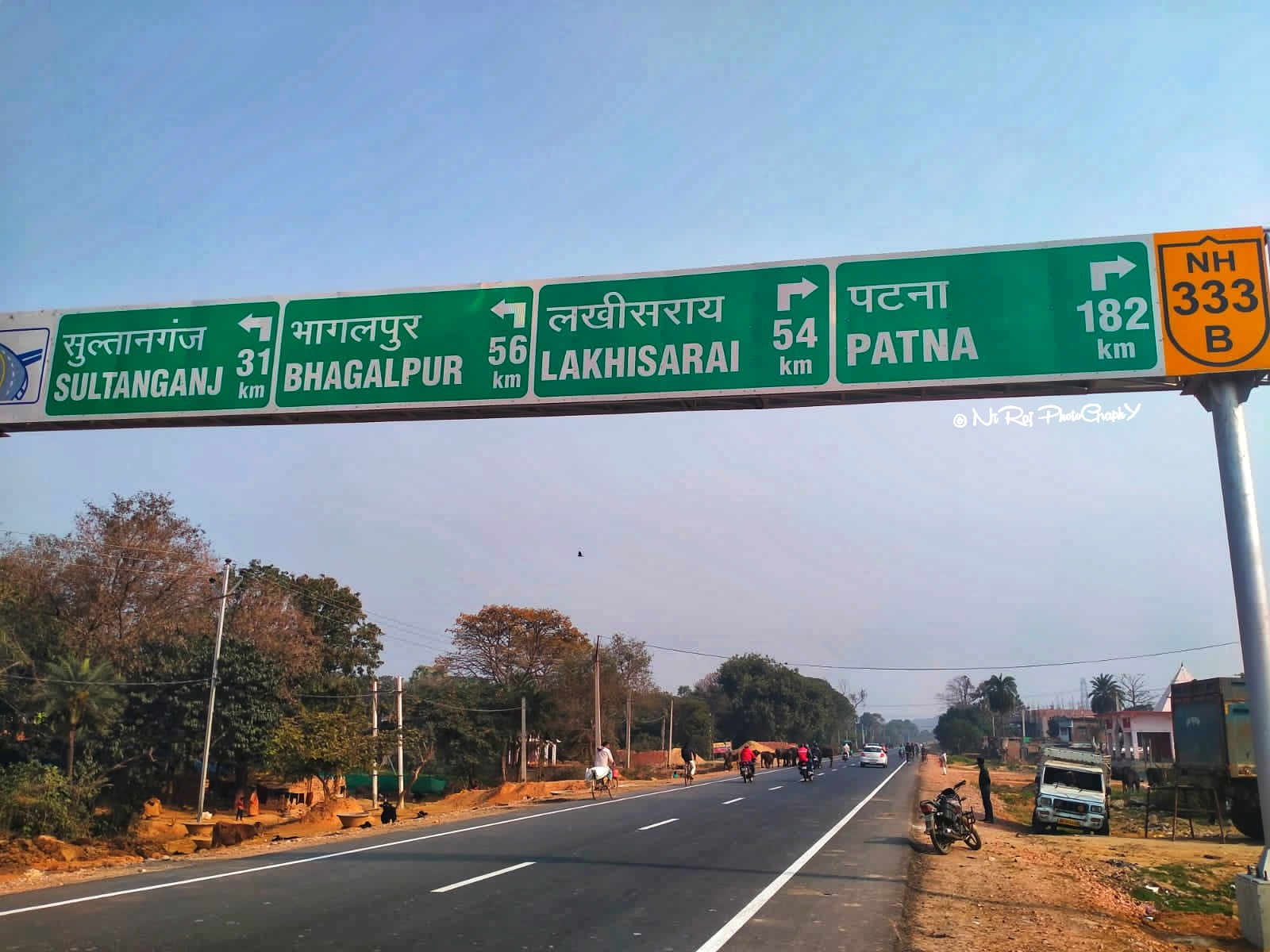
NH - 333B Board in Munger

National Highway 333B, commonly referred to as Munger Ganga Bridge Road is a national highway in India. It is a spur road of National Highway 33. NH-333B traverses the state of Bihar in India.

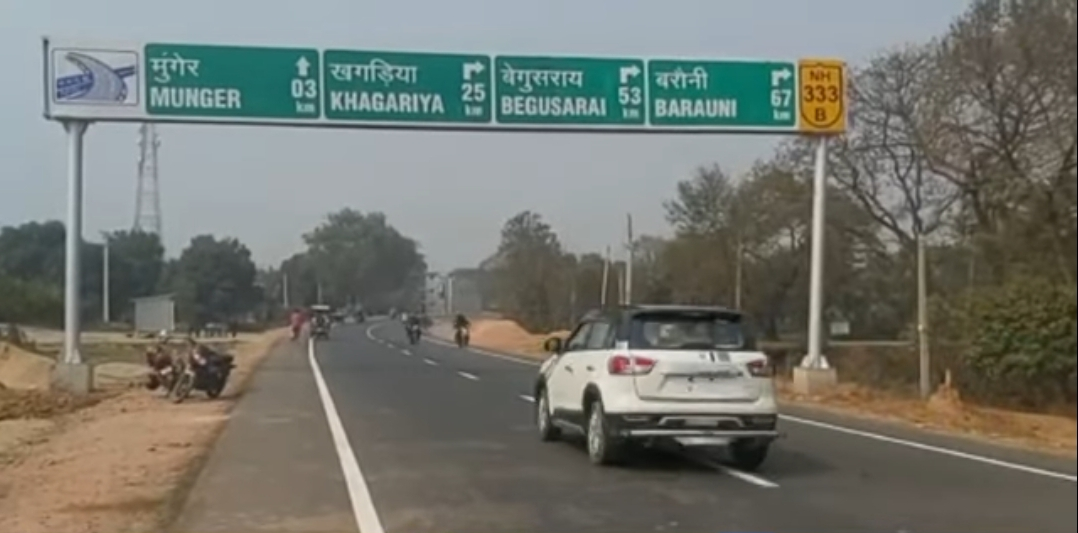
NH333B in Munger

== Munger Ganga Bridge ==
This short national highway connects these two cities via 3.692 km long Munger Ganga Bridge road bridge across river Ganga.

== Junctions ==
NH 33 Terminal in Munger.
NH 31 Terminal near Khagaria.

== See also ==
- List of national highways in India
- List of national highways in India by state
