= East Central Railway zone =

Indian railway zone

East Central Railway

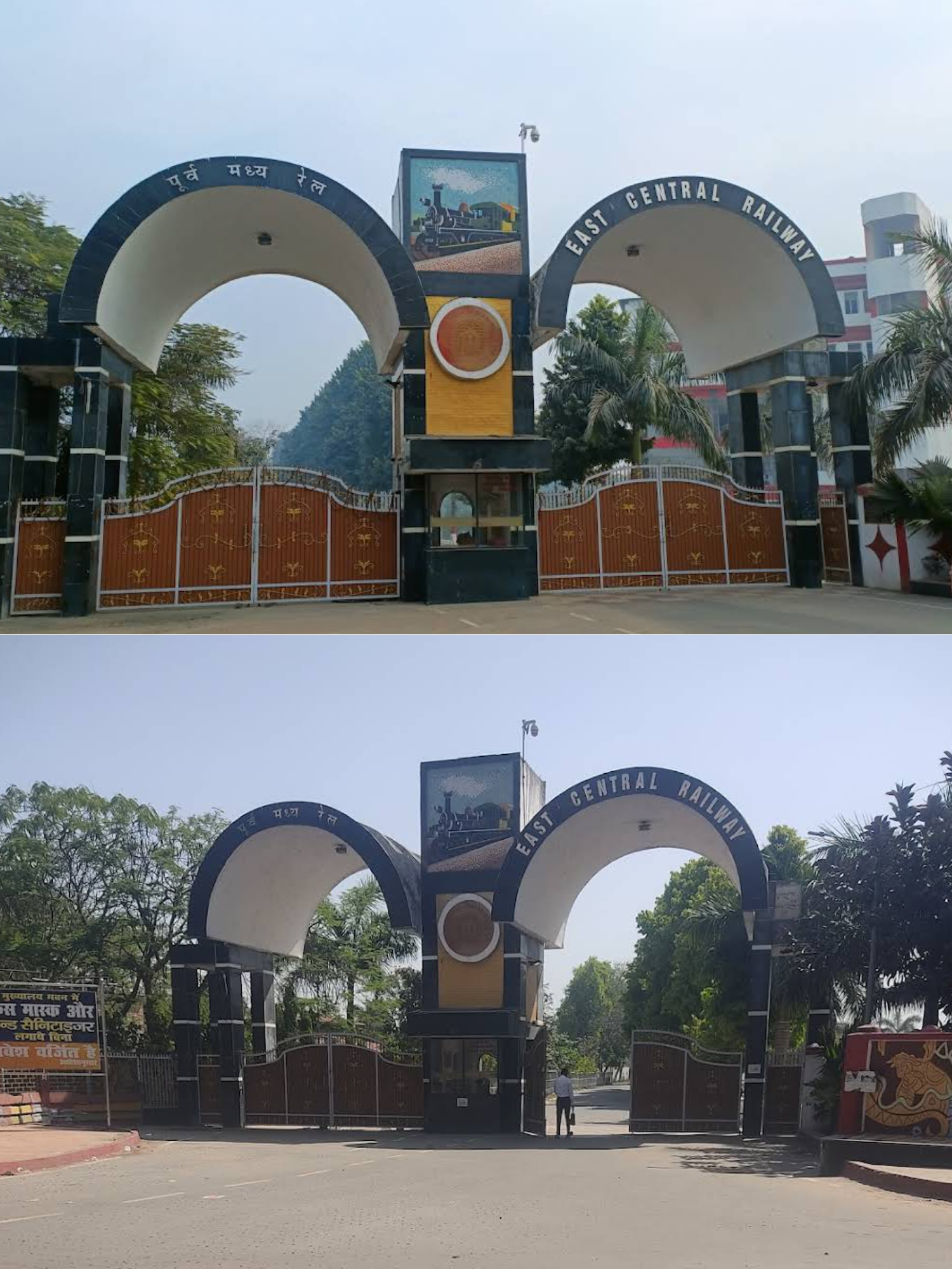
- Main Entrance of ECR Heaquarter

Overview
- Headquarters: Hajipur
- Locale: Bihar, Jharkhand, Uttar Pradesh and Madhya Pradesh
- Dates of operation: 2002; 24 years ago–
- Predecessor: Eastern Railway zone North Eastern Railway zone

Technical
- Track gauge: Broad gauge
- Electrification: Yes

Other
- Website: ECR official website

The East Central Railway (ECR) is one of the 19 railway zones in India, serving primarily the eastern and central regions of the country. Headquartered in Hajipur, Bihar, the zone manages a vast network of railway lines across five divisions: Sonpur, Samastipur, Dhanbad, Danapur & Deen Dayal Upadhyaya

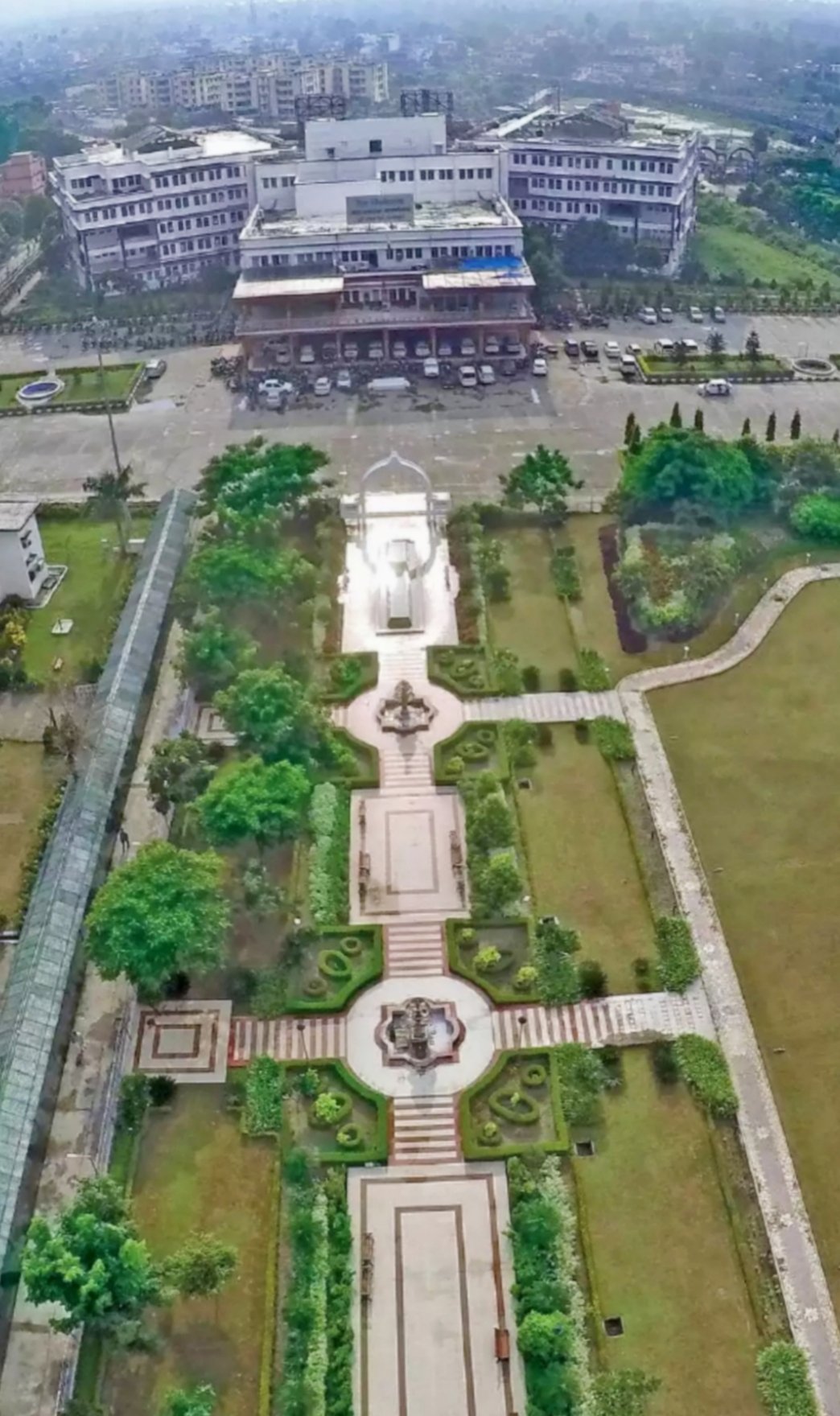
Office of the headquarters of East Central Railway zone, Hajipur

== History ==
Prior to 1996–97, the Indian Railways consisted of nine zones. On 16 June 1996, the Ministry of Railways decided to create six new zones by reorganizing the existing railway network. East Central Railway (ECR), with its headquarters at Hajipur in Bihar, was one of these newly formed zones.

ECR was formally inaugurated on 8 September 1996 and became operational on 1 October 2002. It was carved out from parts of the Eastern Railway (Dhanbad, Danapur, and Pt. Deen Dayal Upadhyaya divisions) and North Eastern Railway (Sonpur and Samastipur divisions).

Over the past two decades, ECR has faced numerous challenges related to workforce and infrastructure, which were addressed with dedicated efforts. As of 31 March 2025, the zone operates a vast network of 9,518.196 track kilometres and 4,399.897 route kilometres, spanning the states of Bihar, Jharkhand, Uttar Pradesh, and Madhya Pradesh, and is fully electrified.

ECR has played a pivotal role in regional development, serving both passenger and freight traffic. Its network supports significant coal transportation from the Dhanbad division and caters to densely populated areas of Bihar. The zone has also developed infrastructure such as new railway lines, doubling of tracks, gauge conversions, bridges, road overbridges, and workshops, while improving safety, cleanliness, catering, and passenger amenities. Additionally, ECR serves as a gateway to Nepal, facilitating international passenger and freight traffic.

The headquarters at Hajipur, the district headquarters of Vaishali district, is located approximately 25 km by road and 33 km by rail from Patna Junction, the capital of Bihar.

== Passenger business ==
East Central Railway (ECR) includes several of the highest revenue-generating railway stations in eastern India. Major stations such as Patna Junction, Muzaffarpur Junction, Danapur, Gaya Junction and Deen Dayal Upadhyaya Junction account for a significant share of the zone's passenger earnings and traffic.

=== FY 2023–24 ===
Top 5 Revenue-Generating Station FY 2023–24
Rank	Station	Revenue (₹ crore)
1	Patna Junction	689
2	Muzaffarpur Junction	275
3	Danapur	269
4	Gaya Junction	231
5	Darbhanga Junction	173

=== FY 2024–25 ===
Top 5 Revenue-Generating Station FY 2024–25
Rank	Station	Passenger Revenue (₹)	Passenger Footfall
1	Patna Junction	8,161,117,262	59,267,836
2	Danapur	3,177,429,779	19,812,549
3	Muzaffarpur Junction	3,137,287,969	18,346,541
4	Deen Dayal Upadhyaya Junction	2,865,359,436	13,123,612
5	Gaya Junction	2,746,706,717	20,380,916
6	Dhanbad Junction	2,263,249,380	18,553,361

=== FY 2025–26 ===
Top 5 Revenue-Generating Station FY 2025–26
Rank	Station
1	Patna Junction
2	Muzaffarpur Junction
3	Danapur
4	Gaya Junction
5	Deen Dayal Upadhyaya Junction

== Divisions ==
East Central Railway consists of five railway divisions. They are:

- Dhanbad Railway Division
- Sonpur railway division
- Danapur railway division
- Pandit Deen Dayal Upadhyaya railway division
- Samastipur railway division

== Major Lines of East Central Railway ==
East Central Railway – Major Lines
Sl. No.	Line
1	Howrah–Delhi main line (Via Patna)
2	Howrah - Delhi Grand Chord Line (Via Dhanbad)
3	Dhanbad - Chandrapura Line
4	Gomoh - Barkakana Branch Line
5	Barauni–Guwahati line
6	Barauni–Samastipur–Muzaffarpur–Hajipur line
7	Muzaffarpur–Gorakhpur line (via Hajipur, Raxaul and Sitamarhi)
8	Muzaffarpur–Gorakhpur main line
9	Sitamarhi–Jaynagar–Nirmali line (via Sursand)
10	Gaya–Kiul line
11	Patna–Gaya line
12	Bakhtiyarpur–Tilaiya line
13	Saharsa–Purnia line
14	Saharsa–Forbesganj line
15	Mansi–Saharsa line
16	Samastipur–Khagaria line
17	Neora–Daniyawan–Bihar Sharif–Sheikhpura line

== Loco sheds ==
- Electric Loco Shed, Gomoh
- Diesel & Electric Loco Shed, Samastipur
- Electric & Diesel Loco Shed, Pt. Deen Dayal Upadhyaya (Mughalsarai)
- Electric Loco Shed, Barauni
- Electric & Diesel Loco Shed, Patratu

== Workshops ==
=== Samastipur Workshop ===
Samastipur Workshop was established in the year 1881 for overhauling of Steam locomotives, POH of coaches and wagons. It was remodelled in 1962 for manufacture of MG wagons. In 1993, manufacturing of BOXN wagons started @1 wagon per month, in addition to the existing activity of wagon POH. POH activity of MG wagons was discontinued in June 1996 and since then this workshop is primarily engaged in production of BOXN wagons. The manufacturing of BOXNHS wagons started in June 2002. At present, the workshop is engaged in manufacturing of Stainless Steel BOXNHL wagons.

=== Carriage Repair Workshop, Harnaut ===
ECR had no carriage repair workshop and was totally dependent on ER and NER. In order to be self-reliant and improve efficiency, workshop for overhauling of 50 coaches per month has been set up at Harnaut on Bakhtiyarpur-Rajgir section of Danapur division of East Central Railway. The workshop is spread over 75 acres of land and there is scope for future expansion. The workshop was taken over by ECR on 15 June 2012, and since then it has carried out POH of 2367 Non-AC ICF 1037 AC ICF coaches. Its present outturn is 75 coaches per month ICF & LHB Coachet. The workshop is expected to reach its installed capacity in 2015–16 and recently repairing air-conditioned ICF & LHB coaches as well.

== Infrastructure ==
=== Rajendra Setu, Begusarai ===
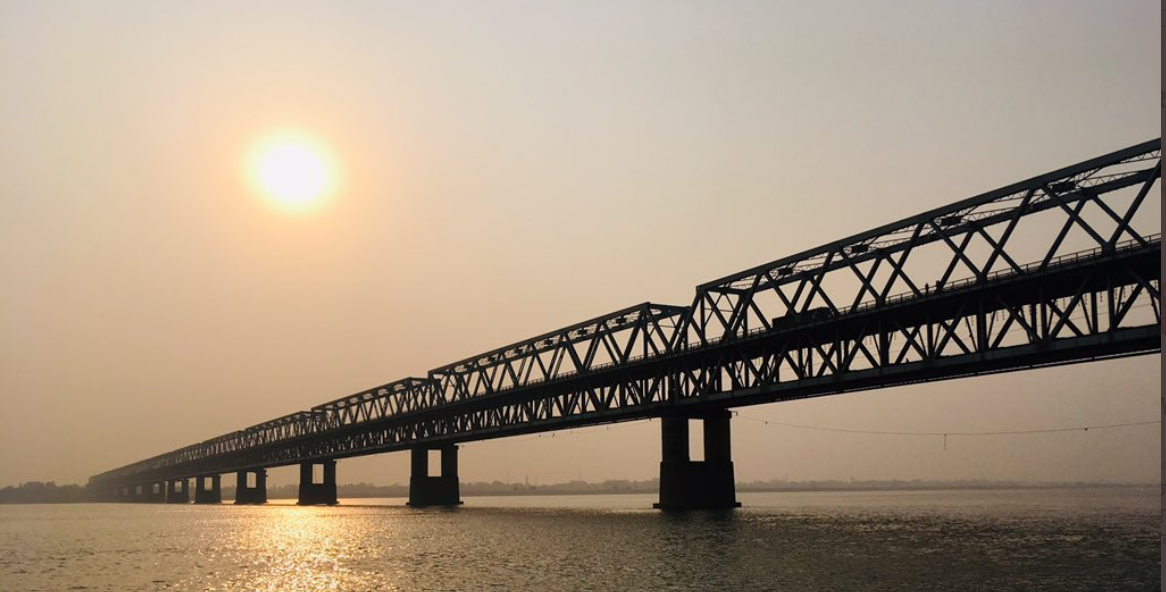
Rajendra Setu

Rajendra Setu, or Simaria Bridge, is a bridge across the Ganges that was the first to link the northern and southern portions of the state of Bihar. The location of the bridge was based on the work of M. Visvesvaraya, who was more than 90 years old at the time. In a wheelchair, he visited the bridge site on the special request of Bihar's chief minister, Shri Krishna Sinha. It was the first bridge over the Ganges to be built in independent India (after 1947).In the entire east to west stretch of about 445 km (277 mi) of river Ganga in Bihar, there is a rail-cum road bridge at Varanasi and then the downstream if we go the nearest Rail link across river Ganga was available at Mokama-Simaria, at Mokama (Rajendra Bridge) which is 318 km (198 mi) from Varanasi.

The road-cum-rail bridge near Hathidah in Patna district and Simaria in Begusarai district was inaugurated in 1959 by Jawaharlal Nehru, prime minister of India, and Shri Krishna Sinha. The bridge was constructed by Braithwaite, Burn & Jessop Construction Company. It is about 2 kilometres (1.2 mi) long and carries a two-lane road and a single-line railway track.

=== Digha- Sonpur Bridge (JP Setu), Patna ===
The Mokama-Simaria rail link was already saturated and become a major bottleneck for increasing the number of trains between North and South Bihar. This has been a great hindrance in the industrialization of North Bihar and Nepal, which have become the important trade centre for consumable goods. Construction of Rail-cum-Road Bridge would remove the bottle-neck and both parts of Bihar will be connected by more number of trains. Trade centers of North Bihar will also be connected with the rest part of Bihar. Power houses at Barauni and Kanti who are undergoing expansion in North Bihar shall also be benefitted due to lessened congestion . The work of Ganga Rail Bridge at Patna was included in 1997–98 when the proposal was only for the Rail bridge but in 2006–07 the scope was increased to Rail cum Road Bridge. It was the longest Rail cum Road bridge. The dilapidated condition of the road bridge connecting North and South Bihar in Patna (Mahatma Gandhi Setu), warrants for immediate arrangement of alternate road bridge. Understanding the problem, in the year 2005, in September 2006 scope of the project was enlarged and Rail bridge was converted into Rail cum Road bridge. The bridge would be second longest Rail-cum-Road Bridge in India with total length of 4556m. The bridge consists of 38 spans. The Road of the bridge is connecting NH-31 of North Bihar to NH-80 of South Bihar. Gladly, work on all the 38 Spans of this mega structure was completed by December 2014. The construction of bridge was completed by 2016 and it was inaugurated by the Honourable Prime Minister of India in March 2016.

=== Shri Krishna Setu, Munger ===
Shri Krishna Setu at Munger has a revised cost of Rs. 2363 crore, in which Rs. 1116 crore share with State Government and Rs. 1247 crore share with Railway. Rail link of the bridge is connecting Jamalpur station of Sahebganj loop (Maldah Division) of Eastern Railway to Sahibpur Kamal station (Barauni-Katihar section) of East Central Railway. The bridge is 3190 m long. All the 31 spans of this bridge have been completed by December 2014. The railway part of the bridge was inaugurated in the year 2016 by the Prime Minister of India but the road took more 6 years and was inaugurated in the 2022. It is named after first chief minister of Bihar Shri Krishna Sinha.

=== Kosi Bridge ===
In the year 1887, a meter gauge rail link between Nirmali and Bhaptiahi (Saraigarh) to Pratapganj up to river Kosi was provided by the Bengal North West Railway. Due to severe Indo-Nepal earthquake on 15 January 1934 (and regular flooding by river Kosi which was changing course towards West) this rail link along with Raharia railway station washed away in heavy flood owing to meandering nature of river Kosi thus from 1934 to 1956 railway section from Supaul-Pratapganj & Nirmali become non existent. (Indian Railway Map of 1942–43) (Indian Railway Map of 1956) And no attempt was made to restore this link for a long period. The Kosi Rail Bridge project included in the budget in the year 2003–04 at an estimated cost of Rs. 323 Crore. After the construction of Kosi Rail Bridge, the distance between Nirmali and Saraigarh (Bhaptiahi) will get reduced to 20.5 km (12.7 mi) from present 299 km (186 mi). It will provide an alternative BG route of length 625 km (388 mi) between Gorakhpur and Katihar via Darbhanga against the existing route of 814 km (506 mi) via Chhapra and Barauni, which at present is a highly saturated corridor. This project gained exceptional significance as Silchar to Porbandar East West Corridor from Muzaffarpur to Purnia (NH 27) of NHAI shares the same location for crossing the river. The bridge is 2,052 metres (6,732 ft) long with 36 spans.

=== New Sone Railway Bridge ===
This bridge was constructed during the year 1898. Due to introduction of clause of MBG-1987 loading, the existing bridge became the major constraint and necessitated the construction of a new alternate bridge. Traffic on this route will increase considerably when the third line between Dehri-On-Sone and Mughalsarai will become operational. The New Sone Bridge between Dehri-on-Sone and Sonenagar which has been successfully commissioned on 16 August 2014, will prove a great help in this regard.

=== Gandak Bridge ===
A new second bridge on river Gandak has been opened (5.5 km [3.4 mi]) between Sonpur and Hajipur for double line traffic for this section.

== See also ==
- All India Station Masters' Association (AISMA)
- Zones and divisions of Indian Railways
