= Umeshnagar railway station =

Railway station in Bihar

Umeshnagar Railway Station

General information
- Location: Rahimpur Village, Khagaria district, Bihar; India
- Coordinates: 25.4677°N 86.4359°E
- Elevation: 31 metres (102 ft)
- Owner: Indian Railways
- Platforms: 3
- Tracks: 6

Construction
- Structure type: Standard on ground

Other information
- Status: Functioning
- Station code: UMNR
- Zone(s): East Central Railway
- Division(s): Sonpur
Location
- Location within Bihar Location within India
- Interactive map

Umeshnagar railway station (station code: UMNR) is a railway station under the Sonpur railway division of East Central Railway. It is located in Rahimpur Panchayat of Khagaria district in the Indian state of Bihar. There are three platforms and 14 halting trains at this station. The station is named after local freedom fighter and Congress politician Umeshwar Prasad singh (son of Babu Tilakdhari Prasad singh).
