= Hamidabad, Anbarabad =

Hamidabad حميداباد
- Village
- Location within Iran
- Coordinates: 28°24′00″N 57°49′12″E
- Country: Iran
- Province: Kerman
- County: Anbarabad
- Bakhsh: Central
- Rural District: Aliabad

Population (2006)
  - Total: 76
- Time zone: UTC+3:30 (IRST)
  - Summer (DST): UTC+4:30 (IRDT)

Hamidabad (Persian: حميداباد, also Romanized as Ḩamīdābād) is a village in Aliabad Rural District, in the Central District of Anbarabad County, Kerman Province, Iran. At the 2006 census, its population was 76, in 17 families.
