= Hamidabad, Sepidan =

Hamidabad حميداباد
- Village
- Location within Iran
- Coordinates: 29°59′52″N 52°22′39″E
- Country: Iran
- Province: Fars
- County: Sepidan
- Bakhsh: Beyza
- Rural District: Beyza

Population (2006)
  - Total: 95
- Time zone: UTC+3:30 (IRST)
  - Summer (DST): UTC+4:30 (IRDT)

Hamidabad (Persian: حميداباد, also Romanized as Ḩamīdābād) is a village in Beyza Rural District, Beyza District, Sepidan County, Fars province, Iran. At the 2006 census, its population was 95, in 26 families.
