= Rahimabad-e Olya =

Rahimabad-e Olya رحيمابادعليا
- Village
- Location within Iran
- Coordinates: 34°25′20″N 46°40′24″E
- Country: Iran
- Province: Kermanshah
- County: Kermanshah
- Bakhsh: Mahidasht
- Rural District: Chaqa Narges

Population (2006)
  - Total: 170
- Time zone: UTC+3:30 (IRST)
  - Summer (DST): UTC+4:30 (IRDT)

Rahimabad-e Olya (Persian: رحيمابادعليا, also Romanized as Raḩīmābād-e ‘Olyā) is a village in Chaqa Narges Rural District, Mahidasht District, Kermanshah County, Kermanshah Province, Iran. At the 2006 census, its population was 170, in 39 families.
