= Rahimabad-e Agah =

Rahimabad-e Agah رحيم اباداگاه
- Village
- Location within Iran
- Coordinates: 30°26′59″N 55°49′30″E
- Country: Iran
- Province: Kerman
- County: Rafsanjan
- Bakhsh: Central
- Rural District: Eslamiyeh

Population (2006)
  - Total: 287
- Time zone: UTC+3:30 (IRST)
  - Summer (DST): UTC+4:30 (IRDT)

Rahimabad-e Agah (Persian: رحيم اباداگاه, also Romanized as Raḩīmābād-e Āgāh; also known as Raḩīmābād) is a village in Eslamiyeh Rural District, in the Central District of Rafsanjan County, Kerman Province, Iran. At the 2006 census, its population was 287, in 67 families.
