= Rahimabad, Miyan Darband =

Rahimabad رحيماباد
- Village
- Location within Iran
- Coordinates: 34°26′38″N 46°59′52″E
- Country: Iran
- Province: Kermanshah
- County: Kermanshah
- Bakhsh: Central
- Rural District: Miyan Darband

Population (2006)
  - Total: 131
- Time zone: UTC+3:30 (IRST)
  - Summer (DST): UTC+4:30 (IRDT)

Rahimabad (Persian: رحيماباد, also Romanized as Raḩīmābād) is a village in Miyan Darband Rural District, in the Central District of Kermanshah County, Kermanshah Province, Iran. At the 2006 census, its population was 131, in 31 families.
