= Madar-e Soleyman Rural District =

Rural district in Fars province, Iran

Madar-e Soleyman Rural District Persian: دهستان مادر سليمان
- Rural District
- Location within Iran
- Coordinates: 30°11′11″N 53°06′06″E
- Country: Iran
- Province: Fars
- County: Pasargad
- District: Pasargad
- Capital: Madar-e Soleyman

Population (2016)
  - Total: 1,876
- Time zone: UTC+3:30 (IRST)

Madar-e Soleyman Rural District (Persian: دهستان مادر سليمان) is in Pasargad District (Note: Formerly Hakhamanish District) of Pasargad County, Fars province, Iran. It is administered from the city of Madar-e Soleyman.

== Demographics ==
=== Population ===
At the time of the 2006 National Census, the rural district's population was 3,720 in 886 households. There were 4,072 inhabitants in 1,111 households at the following census of 2011. The 2016 census measured the population of the rural district as 1,876 in 517 households. The most populous of its 11 villages was Mobarakabad, with 1,204 people.
