= Rahimabad, Fasa =

Rahimabad رحيم اباد
- Village
- Location within Iran
- Coordinates: 28°34′43″N 53°57′25″E
- Country: Iran
- Province: Fars
- County: Fasa
- Bakhsh: Shibkaveh
- Rural District: Miyan Deh

Population (2006)
  - Total: 601
- Time zone: UTC+3:30 (IRST)
  - Summer (DST): UTC+4:30 (IRDT)

Rahimabad (Persian: رحيم اباد, also Romanized as Raḩīmābād) is a village in Miyan Deh Rural District, Shibkaveh District, Fasa County, Fars province, Iran. At the 2006 census, its population was 601, in 124 families.
