= Rahimabad, Khuzestan =

Rahimabad رحيم اباد
- Village
- Location within Iran
- Coordinates: 32°11′42″N 49°31′32″E
- Country: Iran
- Province: Khuzestan
- County: Andika
- Bakhsh: Central
- Rural District: Qaleh-ye Khvajeh

Population (2006)
  - Total: 52
- Time zone: UTC+3:30 (IRST)
  - Summer (DST): UTC+4:30 (IRDT)

Rahimabad (Persian: رحيم اباد, also Romanized as Raḩīmābād) is a village in Qaleh-ye Khvajeh Rural District, in the Central District of Andika County, Khuzestan Province, Iran. At the 2006 census, its population was 52, in 8 families.
