= Rahimpur village, Khagaria =

Village in Bihar

Rahimpur is a village in Khagaria District of the Indian state of Bihar. It is divided into three panchayats, Rahimpur Uttar (Rahimpur North), Rahimpur Madhya (Rahimpur Central) and Rahimpur Dakshin (Rahimpur South). It is situated on NH 31 on side and the riverbeds of Ganga.

== Infrastructure ==
Local infrastructure such as health centres, sanitation, and village roads, is inadequate. Annual floods disrupt services.

== Transport ==
The village is located by National Highway 31. The nearest railway station is Umeshnagar railway station in Durgapur village in Madhya Rahimpur. The nearest major station is the Khagaria Railway station. The Munger rail and road bridge over the Ganga river are nearby.

== Notables ==
Notable people born in Rahimpur include:

- Umeshwar Prasad Singh, a local freedom fighter in the Indian Independence movement and the namesake of the Umeshnagar railway station
- Yogendra Sharma (Parliamentarian)
- Ramendra Kumar (Parliamentarian)
- Abhayanand, the former DGP of Bihar and an educator, is connected to Rahimpur via his mother.
