= Rahimabad, Kurdistan =

Rahimabad رحيم آباد
- Village
- Location within Iran
- Coordinates: 36°20′03″N 46°42′03″E
- Country: Iran
- Province: Kurdistan
- County: Saqqez
- Bakhsh: Ziviyeh
- Rural District: Gol Tappeh

Population (2006)
  - Total: 129
- Time zone: UTC+3:30 (IRST)
  - Summer (DST): UTC+4:30 (IRDT)

Rahimabad (Persian: رحيم آباد, also Romanized as Raḩīmābād) is a village in Gol Tappeh Rural District, Ziviyeh District, Saqqez County, Kurdistan Province, Iran. At the 2006 census, its population was 129, in 22 families. The village is populated by Kurds.
