= Hamidabad, Shush =

Hamidabad حميداباد
- Village
- Location within Iran
- Coordinates: 32°14′27″N 48°19′51″E
- Country: Iran
- Province: Khuzestan
- County: Shush
- Bakhsh: Central
- Rural District: Hoseynabad

Population (2006)
  - Total: 573
- Time zone: UTC+3:30 (IRST)
  - Summer (DST): UTC+4:30 (IRDT)

Hamidabad (Persian: حميداباد, also Romanized as Ḩamīdābād; also known as Mamīdābād and Shahrak-e Shohadā) is a village in Hoseynabad Rural District, in the Central District of Shush County, Khuzestan Province, Iran. At the 2006 census, its population was 573, in 109 families.
