= Rahimabad, Swat =

Rahimabad
- Union Council
- Country: Pakistan
- Province: Khyber Pakhtunkhwa
- District: Swat
- Time zone: UTC+5 (PST)

Rahimabad (also spelled: Rahim Abad) (Pashto: رحيم آباد) is an administrative unit, known as Union council or Wards in Tehsil Babuzai, of Swat District in the Khyber Pakhtunkhwa province of Pakistan.

According to Khyber Pakhtunkhwa Local Government Act 2013. District Swat has 67 Wards, of which total number of Village Councils is 170, and Neighbourhood Council is 44.

Rahimabad is Territorial Ward, which is further divided in two Neighbourhood Councils:

1. Rahim Abad / Rahman Abad (Neighbourhood Council)
2. Rahim Abad / Amankot (Neighbourhood Council)

== See also ==
- Babuzai
- Swat District
