= Rahimabad, Neyriz =

Rahimabad رحيم اباد
- Village
- Location within Iran
- Coordinates: 29°13′28″N 54°13′31″E
- Country: Iran
- Province: Fars
- County: Neyriz
- Bakhsh: Central
- Rural District: Rostaq

Population (2006)
  - Total: 45
- Time zone: UTC+3:30 (IRST)
  - Summer (DST): UTC+4:30 (IRDT)

Rahimabad (Persian: رحيم اباد, also Romanized as Raḩīmābād; also known as Qal‘eh-ye Raḩīmābād) is a village in Rostaq Rural District, in the Central District of Neyriz County, Fars province, Iran. At the 2006 census, its population was 45, in 11 families.
