= Rahimpur Bishdhan =

- Village
- Location in Kanpur, Uttar Pradesh, India Rahimpur Bishdhan (India)
- Coordinates: 26.826490°N 79.908535°E
- Country: India
- State: Uttar Pradesh
- District: Kanpur Nagar

Languages
  - Official: Hindi
- Time zone: UTC+5:30 (IST)
- PIN: 209202
- Vehicle registration: UP-78

Rahimpur Bishdhan is a village in Bilhaur Tehsil, Kanpur Nagar district, Uttar Pradesh, India. It is located 70 kilometers away from Kanpur Central railway station. Its population is 4,772 people as per the 2011 census of India.
