= Hamidabad, Dalgan =

Hamidabad حميداباد
- Village
- Location within Iran
- Coordinates: 27°33′39″N 59°15′53″E
- Country: Iran
- Province: Sistan and Baluchestan
- County: Dalgan
- Bakhsh: Central
- Rural District: Dalgan

Population (2006)
  - Total: 790
- Time zone: UTC+3:30 (IRST)
  - Summer (DST): UTC+4:30 (IRDT)

Hamidabad (Persian: حميداباد, also Romanized as Ḩamīdābād) is a village in Dalgan Rural District, in the Central District of Dalgan County, Sistan and Baluchestan Province, Iran. At the 2006 census, its population was 790, in 150 families.
