= Abu ol Verdi Rural District =

Rural district in Fars province, Iran

Abu ol Verdi Rural District Persian: دهستان ابوالوردئ
- Rural District
- Location within Iran
- Coordinates: 30°16′41″N 53°00′38″E
- Country: Iran
- Province: Fars
- County: Pasargad
- District: Pasargad
- Capital: Abu ol Verdi

Population (2016)
  - Total: 2,739
- Time zone: UTC+3:30 (IRST)

Abu ol Verdi Rural District (Persian: دهستان ابوالوردئ) is in Pasargad District (Note: Formerly Hakhamanish District) of Pasargad County, Fars province, Iran. Its capital is the village of Abu ol Verdi.

== Demographics ==
=== Population ===
At the time of the 2006 National Census, the rural district's population was 2,451 in 574 households. There were 2,455 inhabitants in 640 households at the following census of 2011. The 2016 census measured the population of the rural district as 2,739 in 765 households. The most populous of its five villages was Abu ol Verdi, with 2,601 people.
