= Sahibpur Kamal Junction railway station =

Railway station in Begusarai district, India

Sahibpur Kamal Junction Railway Station

General information
- Location: National Highway 31, Begusarai district, Bihar; India
- Coordinates: 25°25′36.9″N 86°24′01.9″E
- Elevation: 32 metres (105 ft)
- System: Indian Railways station
- Owner: Indian Railways
- Operator: Indian Railways
- Platforms: 2

Construction
- Structure type: Standard (on-ground station)
- Parking: No

Other information
- Status: Functioning
- Station code: SKJ
- Zone(s): East Central Railway
- Division(s): Sonpur Railway Division

History
- Former names: East Indian Railway
Location
- Location within India Location within Bihar

Sahebpur Kamal Junction railway station (station code: SKJ) is a railway station in the Sonpur railway division of East Central Railway. It is located in Sahebpur Kamal Vidhan Sabha Constituency in Begusarai district, of the Indian state of Bihar.
