= Rahimabad (Kuhsabad), Rivand =

Rahimabad رحيم اباد
- Village
- Location within Iran
- Coordinates: 36°12′02″N 58°41′35″E
- Country: Iran
- Province: Razavi Khorasan
- County: Nishapur
- Bakhsh: Central
- Rural District: Rivand

Population (2006)
  - Total: 305
- Time zone: UTC+3:30 (IRST)
  - Summer (DST): UTC+4:30 (IRDT)

Rahimabad (Persian: رحيم اباد, also Romanized as Raḩīmābād; also known as Kūhsābād) is a village in Rivand Rural District, in the Central District of Nishapur County, Razavi Khorasan Province, Iran. At the 2006 census, its population was 305, in 80 families.
