= Sarpaniran Rural District =

Rural district in Fars province, Iran

Sarpaniran Rural District Persian: دهستان سرپنيران
- Rural District
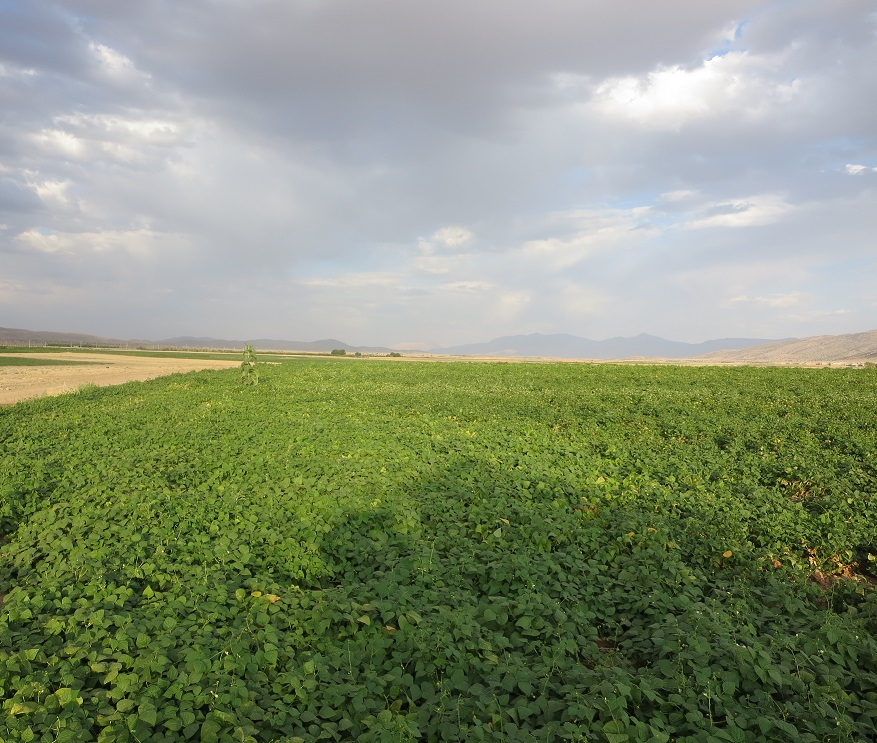

- Location within Iran
- Coordinates: 30°02′15″N 53°21′39″E
- Country: Iran
- Province: Fars
- County: Pasargad
- District: Central
- Capital: Naimabad

Population (2016)
  - Total: 1,425
- Time zone: UTC+3:30 (IRST)

Sarpaniran Rural District (Persian: دهستان سرپنيران) is in the Central District of Pasargad County, Fars province, Iran. Its capital is the village of Naimabad.

== Demographics ==
=== Population ===
At the time of the 2006 National Census, the rural district's population was 2,185 in 558 households. There were 1,857 inhabitants in 475 households at the following census of 2011. The 2016 census measured the population of the rural district as 1,425 in 435 households. The most populous of its 27 villages was Naimabad, with 424 people.
