= Pasargad District =

District in Fars province, Iran

Pasargad District Persian: بخش پاسارگاد
- District
- Location within Iran
- Coordinates: 30°14′09″N 53°04′11″E
- Country: Iran
- Province: Fars
- County: Pasargad
- Capital: Madar-e Soleyman

Population (2016)
  - Total: 6,161
- Time zone: UTC+3:30 (IRST)

Pasargad District (Persian: بخش پاسارگاد) (Note: Formerly Hakhamanish District (بخش هخامنش) Hakhamanish is the modern Persian version of Achaemenes, the founder of the ancient Persian Achaemenid Dynasty.) is in Pasargad County, Fars province, Iran. Its capital is the city of Madar-e Soleyman.

== Demographics ==
=== Population ===
At the time of the 2006 National Census, the district's population was 6,171 in 1,460 households. The following census in 2011 counted 6,527 people in 1,751 households. The 2016 census measured the population of the district as 6,161 inhabitants in 1,734 households.

=== Administrative divisions ===
Pasargad District Population
Administrative Divisions	2006	2011	2016
Abu ol Verdi RD	2,451	2,455	2,739
Madar-e Soleyman RD	3,720	4,072	1,876
Madar-e Soleyman (city)			1,546
Total	6,171	6,527	6,161
RD = Rural District
