= Kamin Rural District =

Rural district in Fars province, Iran

Kamin Rural District Persian: دهستان كمين
- Rural District
- Location within Iran
- Coordinates: 30°04′07″N 53°02′44″E
- Country: Iran
- Province: Fars
- County: Pasargad
- District: Central

Population (2016)
  - Total: 5,399
- Time zone: UTC+3:30 (IRST)

Kamin Rural District (Persian: دهستان كمين) is in the Central District of Pasargad County, Fars province, Iran.

== Demographics ==
=== Population ===
At the time of the 2006 National Census, the rural district's population was 5,522 in 1,268 households. There were 6,229 inhabitants in 1,632 households at the following census of 2011. The 2016 census measured the population of the rural district as 5,399 in 1,622 households. The most populous of its 57 villages was Akbarabad, with 1,886 people.
