= Central District (Pasargad County) =

District in Fars province, Iran

Central District (Pasargad County) Persian: بخش مرکزی شهرستان پاسارگاد
- District
- Location within Iran
- Coordinates: 30°03′54″N 53°12′39″E
- Country: Iran
- Province: Fars
- County: Pasargad
- Capital: Saadat Shahr

Population (2016)
  - Total: 23,955
- Time zone: UTC+3:30 (IRST)

The Central District of Pasargad County (Persian: بخش مرکزی شهرستان پاسارگاد) is in Fars province, Iran. Its capital is the city of Saadat Shahr.

== Demographics ==
=== Population ===
At the time of the 2006 National Census, the district's population was 23,654 in 5,640 households. The following census in 2011 counted 24,962 people in 6,621 households. The 2016 census measured the population of the district as 23,955 inhabitants in 7,078 households.

=== Administrative divisions ===
Central District (Pasargad County) Population
| Administrative Divisions | 2006 | 2011 | 2016 |
|---|---|---|---|
| Kamin RD | 5,522 | 6,229 | 5,399 |
| Sarpaniran RD | 2,185 | 1,857 | 1,425 |
| Saadat Shahr (city) | 15,947 | 16,876 | 17,131 |
| Total | 23,654 | 24,962 | 23,955 |
RD = Rural District
