= Pasargad County =

County in Fars province, Iran

Pasargad County Persian: شهرستان پاسارگاد
- County
- Location of Pasargad County in Fars province (top center, purple)

- Location of Fars province in Iran
- Coordinates: 30°10′N 53°09′E
- Country: Iran
- Province: Fars
- Capital: Saadat Shahr
- Districts: Central, Pasargad

Population (2016)
  - Total: 30,118
- Time zone: UTC+3:30 (IRST)

Pasargad County (Persian: شهرستان پاسارگاد) is in Fars province, Iran. Its capital is the city of Saadat Shahr.

== History ==
After the 2011 National Census, the village of Madar-e-Soleyman was elevated to the status of a city.

== Demographics ==
=== Population ===
At the time of the 2006 census, the county's population was 29,825 in 7,100 households. The following census in 2011 counted 31,504 people in 8,364 households. The 2016 census measured the population of the county as 30,118 in 8,813 households.

=== Administrative divisions ===
Pasargad County's population history and administrative structure over three consecutive censuses are shown in the following table.

Pasargad County Population
Administrative Divisions	2006	2011	2016
Central District	23,654	24,962	23,955
Kamin RD	5,522	6,229	5,399
Sarpaniran RD	2,185	1,857	1,425
Saadat Shahr (city)	15,947	16,876	17,131
Pasargad District (Note: Formerly Hakhamanish District)	6,171	6,527	6,161
Abu ol Verdi RD	2,451	2,455	2,739
Madar-e Soleyman RD	3,720	4,072	1,876
Madar-e Soleyman (city)			1,546
Total	29,825	31,504	30,118
RD = Rural District

== See also ==
Media related to Pasargad County at Wikimedia Commons
