= Jannatabad =

Jannatabad or Jenatabad may refer to:

== Bengal ==
- Jannatabad, a historical town also called Gauḍa, in Bengal

== Iran ==
=== Hamadan Province ===
- Jannatabad, Hamadan, a village in Asadabad County

=== Hormozgan Province ===
- Jannatabad, Hormozgan

=== Kerman Province ===
- Jannatabad, Arzuiyeh, a village in Arzuiyeh County
- Jannatabad, Manujan, a village in Manujan County
- Jannatabad, Narmashir, a village in Narmashir County
- Jannatabad, Rafsanjan, a village in Rafsanjan County
- Jannatabad, Ferdows, a village in Rafsanjan County
- Jannatabad, Rigan, a village in Rigan County
- Jannatabad 1, a village in Sirjan County

=== Qazvin Province ===
- Jannatabad, Buin Zahra, Qazvin Province
- Jannatabad, Qazvin

=== Qom Province ===
- Jannatabad, Qom

=== Razavi Khorasan Province ===
- Jannatabad, Khoshab, a village in Khoshab County
- Jannatabad, Mahvelat, a village in Mahvelat County
- Jannatabad-e Jangal, a village in Rashtkhvar County
- Jannatabad, Torbat-e Jam, a village in Torbat-e Jam County
- Jannatabad Rural District, an administrative subdivision of Torbat-e Jam County

=== Semnan Province ===
- Jannatabad, Semnan, a village in Garmsar County

=== South Khorasan Province ===
- Jannatabad, Qaen, South Khorasan Province
- Jannatabad, Sarbisheh, South Khorasan Province
- Jannatabad, Mud, South Khorasan Province

=== Tehran Province ===
- Jannat Abad, a neighbourhood of Tehran
