= Shojaabad =

Shojaabad or Shojaʽabad (Persian: شجاع‌آباد) may refer to:

- Shojaabad, East Azerbaijan
- Shojaabad, Golestan
- Shojaabad, Kashan, Isfahan Province
- Shojaabad, Kerman
- Shojaabad, Rafsanjan, Kerman Province
- Shojaabad-e Mohammad Ali, Kerman Province
- Shojaabad-e Pain
- Shojaabad, Kurdistan
- Shojaabad, Kurdistan (second village)
- Shojaabad, Lorestan
