= Qaemiyeh (disambiguation) =

Qaemiyeh is a city in Fars Province, Iran.

Qaemiyeh (Persian: قائميه) may refer to:

- Qaemiyeh, Anbarabad, Kerman Province
- Qaemiyeh, Rafsanjan, Kerman Province
- Qaemiyeh-ye Do, Rafsanjan County, Kerman Province
- Qaemiyeh, Mazandaran
- Qaemiyeh-ye Olya, Mazandaran Province
- Qaemiyeh-ye Sofla, Mazandaran Province
- Qaemiyeh, Yazd
