= Mortazavi =

Mortazavi (Persian: مرتضوی) may refer to:

== People ==
- Bijan Mortazavi (b. 1957), Iranian musician
- Negar Mortazavi (b. 1981), Iranian-American journalist
- Saeed Mortazavi, (b. 1967), Iranian judge and politician
- Sowlat Mortazavi (b. 1955), Iranian politician
- Taha Mortazavi (b. 1988), Iranian futsal player
- Yadollah Mortazavi (b. 1958), Iranian professor and researcher

== Places ==
- Jannat-e Mortazavi, a village in Kerman province, Iran
- Javadiyeh-ye Mortazavi, a village in Kerman province, Iran
- Mortazavi, Iran, a village in Razavi Khorasan Province, Iran
