= Mahmudiyeh =

Mahmudiyeh (Persian: محموديه) may refer to:

- Mahmudiyeh, Hamadan
- Mahmudiyeh, Bardsir, Kerman Province
- Mahmudiyeh, Rafsanjan, Kerman Province
- Mahmudiyeh, Azadegan, Rafsanjan County, Kerman Province
- Mahmudiyeh, Ferdows, Rafsanjan County, Kerman Province
- Mahmudiyeh, Rigan, Kerman Province
- Mahmudiyeh, Markazi

== See also ==
- Mahmoudiyah (disambiguation)
- Mahmoudieh (disambiguation)
- Mahmoodieh, residential area in Tehran
