= Jannat (disambiguation) =

Jannat is a Moroccan singer. Jannat may also refer to:

- Jannah, Muslim concept of paradise
- Jannat, alternate name of Jannatabad, Rafsanjan, village in Iran
- Jannat, South Khorasan, village in Iran
- Jannat: In Search of Heaven..., 2008 Indian film by Kunal Deshmukh
  - Jannat 2, 2012 Indian film by Kunal Deshmukh, sequel to the 2008 film
- Jannat (2018 film), Bangladeshi film
- Jannat (Indian TV series), 2001 Indian television series

People

- Jannat Al Ghezi, Iraqi activist, awarded the Woman of Courage in 2017
- Jannat Jalil, British journalist
- Jannat Zubair Rahmani (born 2001), Indian actress

== See also ==
- Jannat al-Mu'alla, cemetery in Mecca, Saudi Arabia
- Jannat al-Baqi, cemetery in Medina, Saudi Arabia
- Jannat District, an administrative division of Darab County, Fars province, Iran
- Jannat Shahr, city in Iran
- Jannat-e Mortazavi, village in Iran
- Jannatabad (disambiguation)
