= Mohammadabad-e Herati =

Mohammadabad-e Herati محمدابادهراتي
- Village
- Location within Iran
- Coordinates: 30°50′06″N 55°48′04″E
- Country: Iran
- Province: Kerman
- County: Rafsanjan
- Bakhsh: Ferdows
- Rural District: Ferdows

Population (2006)
  - Total: 282
- Time zone: UTC+3:30 (IRST)
  - Summer (DST): UTC+4:30 (IRDT)

Mohammadabad-e Herati (Persian: محمدابادهراتي, also Romanized as Moḩammadābād-e Herātī and Moḩammadābād-e Harātī; also known as Moḩammadābād and Muhammadābād) is a village in Ferdows Rural District, Ferdows District, Rafsanjan County, Kerman Province, Iran. At the 2006 census, its population was 282, in 70 families.
