= Fathabad, Ferdows, Rafsanjan =

Fathabad فتح اباد
- Village
- Location within Iran
- Coordinates: 30°48′51″N 55°48′26″E
- Country: Iran
- Province: Kerman
- County: Rafsanjan
- Bakhsh: Ferdows
- Rural District: Ferdows

Population (2006)
  - Total: 147
- Time zone: UTC+3:30 (IRST)
  - Summer (DST): UTC+4:30 (IRDT)

Fathabad (Persian: فتح اباد, also Romanized as Faţḩābād and Fatḩābād) is a village in Ferdows Rural District, Ferdows District, Rafsanjan County, Kerman Province, Iran. At the 2006 census, its population was 147, in 37 families.
