= Aliabad-e Herati =

Aliabad-e Herati علي ابادهراتي
- Village
- Location within Iran
- Coordinates: 30°49′43″N 55°47′15″E
- Country: Iran
- Province: Kerman
- County: Rafsanjan
- Bakhsh: Ferdows
- Rural District: Ferdows

Population (2006)
  - Total: 196
- Time zone: UTC+3:30 (IRST)
  - Summer (DST): UTC+4:30 (IRDT)

Aliabad-e Herati (Persian: علي ابادهراتي, also Romanized as ‘Alīābād-e Herātī and ‘Alīābād-e Harātī; also known as ‘Alīābād) is a village in Ferdows Rural District, Ferdows District, Rafsanjan County, Kerman Province, Iran. At the 2006 census, its population was 196, in 49 families.
