= Roknabad, Rafsanjan =

Roknabad رکن‌آباد
- Village
- Location within Iran
- Coordinates: 30°50′30″N 55°44′22″E
- Country: Iran
- Province: Kerman
- County: Rafsanjan
- Bakhsh: Ferdows
- Rural District: Ferdows

Population (2006)
  - Total: 755
- Time zone: UTC+3:30 (IRST)
  - Summer (DST): UTC+4:30 (IRDT)

Roknabad (Persian: رکن‌آباد, also Romanized as Roknābād; also known as Rokn Abad Nogh) is a village in Ferdows Rural District, Ferdows District, Rafsanjan County, Kerman Province, Iran. At the 2006 census, its population was 755, in 197 families.
