= Javadiyeh-ye Mortazavi =

Javadiyeh-ye Mortazavi جواديه مرتضوي
- Village
- Location within Iran
- Coordinates: 30°49′07″N 55°46′17″E
- Country: Iran
- Province: Kerman
- County: Rafsanjan
- Bakhsh: Ferdows
- Rural District: Ferdows

Population (2006)
  - Total: 364
- Time zone: UTC+3:30 (IRST)
  - Summer (DST): UTC+4:30 (IRDT)

Javadiyeh-ye Mortazavi (Persian: جواديه مرتضوي, also Romanized as Javādīyeh-ye Mortaz̤avī; also known as Javādīyeh) is a village in Ferdows Rural District, Ferdows District, Rafsanjan County, Kerman Province, Iran. At the 2006 census, its population was 364, in 92 families.
