= Mahmudiyeh, Ferdows =

Mahmudiyeh محموديه
- Village
- Location within Iran
- Coordinates: 30°46′25″N 55°51′04″E
- Country: Iran
- Province: Kerman
- County: Rafsanjan
- Bakhsh: Ferdows
- Rural District: Rezvan

Population (2006)
  - Total: 120
- Time zone: UTC+3:30 (IRST)
  - Summer (DST): UTC+4:30 (IRDT)

Mahmudiyeh (Persian: محموديه, also Romanized as Maḩmūdīyeh) is a village in Rezvan Rural District, Ferdows District, Rafsanjan County, Kerman Province, Iran. At the 2006 census, its population was 120, in 31 families.
