= Esmailabad, Ferdows =

Village in Kerman province, Iran

Esmailabad Persian: اسماعيل اباد
- Village
- Location within Iran
- Coordinates: 30°45′58″N 55°53′46″E
- Country: Iran
- Province: Kerman
- County: Rafsanjan
- District: Ferdows
- Rural District: Rezvan

Population (2016)
  - Total: 4,201
- Time zone: UTC+3:30 (IRST)

Esmailabad (Persian: اسماعيل اباد) (Note: Also romanized as Esmā‘īlābād; also known as Esma’il Abad Olya) is a village in, and the capital of, Rezvan Rural District of Ferdows District, Rafsanjan County, Kerman province, Iran.

== Demographics ==
=== Population ===
At the time of the 2006 National Census, the village's population was 3,034 in 765 households. The following census in 2011 counted 3,021 people in 839 households. The 2016 census measured the population of the village as 4,201 people in 1,238 households. It was the most populous village in its rural district.
