= Nasehabad, Kerman =

Nasehabad ناصح اباد
- Village
- Location within Iran
- Coordinates: 30°48′03″N 55°49′19″E
- Country: Iran
- Province: Kerman
- County: Rafsanjan
- Bakhsh: Ferdows
- Rural District: Ferdows

Population (2006)
  - Total: 302
- Time zone: UTC+3:30 (IRST)
  - Summer (DST): UTC+4:30 (IRDT)

Nasehabad (Persian: ناصح اباد, also Romanized as Nāşeḩābād) is a village in Ferdows Rural District, Ferdows District, Rafsanjan County, Kerman Province, Iran. At the 2006 census, its population was 302, in 75 families.
