= Qaemiyeh, Rafsanjan =

Qaemiyeh قائميه
- Village
- Location within Iran
- Coordinates: 30°47′06″N 55°49′15″E
- Country: Iran
- Province: Kerman
- County: Rafsanjan
- Bakhsh: Ferdows
- Rural District: Ferdows

Population (2006)
  - Total: 186
- Time zone: UTC+3:30 (IRST)
  - Summer (DST): UTC+4:30 (IRDT)

Qaemiyeh (Persian: قائميه, also Romanized as Qā’emīyeh) is a village in Ferdows Rural District, Ferdows District, Rafsanjan County, Kerman Province, Iran. At the 2006 census, its population was 186, in 48 families.
