= Shujaabad =

Shujaabad may refer to:

- Shujabad, Pakistan
- Shojaabad (disambiguation), places in Iran
