= Nasehabad =

Nasehabad (Persian: ناصح اباد) may refer to:

- Nasehabad, Hamadan
- Nasehabad, Kerman
