= Mehdiabad, Rafsanjan =

Village in Kerman province, Iran

Mehdiabad Persian: مهدي اباد
- Village
- Location within Iran
- Coordinates: 30°47′19″N 55°49′43″E
- Country: Iran
- Province: Kerman
- County: Rafsanjan
- District: Ferdows
- Rural District: Ferdows

Population (2016)
  - Total: 1,590
- Time zone: UTC+3:30 (IRST)

Mehdiabad (Persian: مهدي اباد) (Note: Also romanized as Mehdīābād; also known as Mihdīābād) is a village in Ferdows Rural District of Ferdows District, Rafsanjan County, Kerman province, Iran.

== Demographics ==
=== Population ===
At the time of the 2006 National Census, the village's population was 1,177 in 319 households. The following census in 2011 counted 1,388 people in 423 households. The 2016 census measured the population of the village as 1,590 people in 476 households. It was the most populous village in its rural district.
