= Ahmad Tafazzoli =

Iranian academic (1937–1997)

- Persian: احمد تفضلی
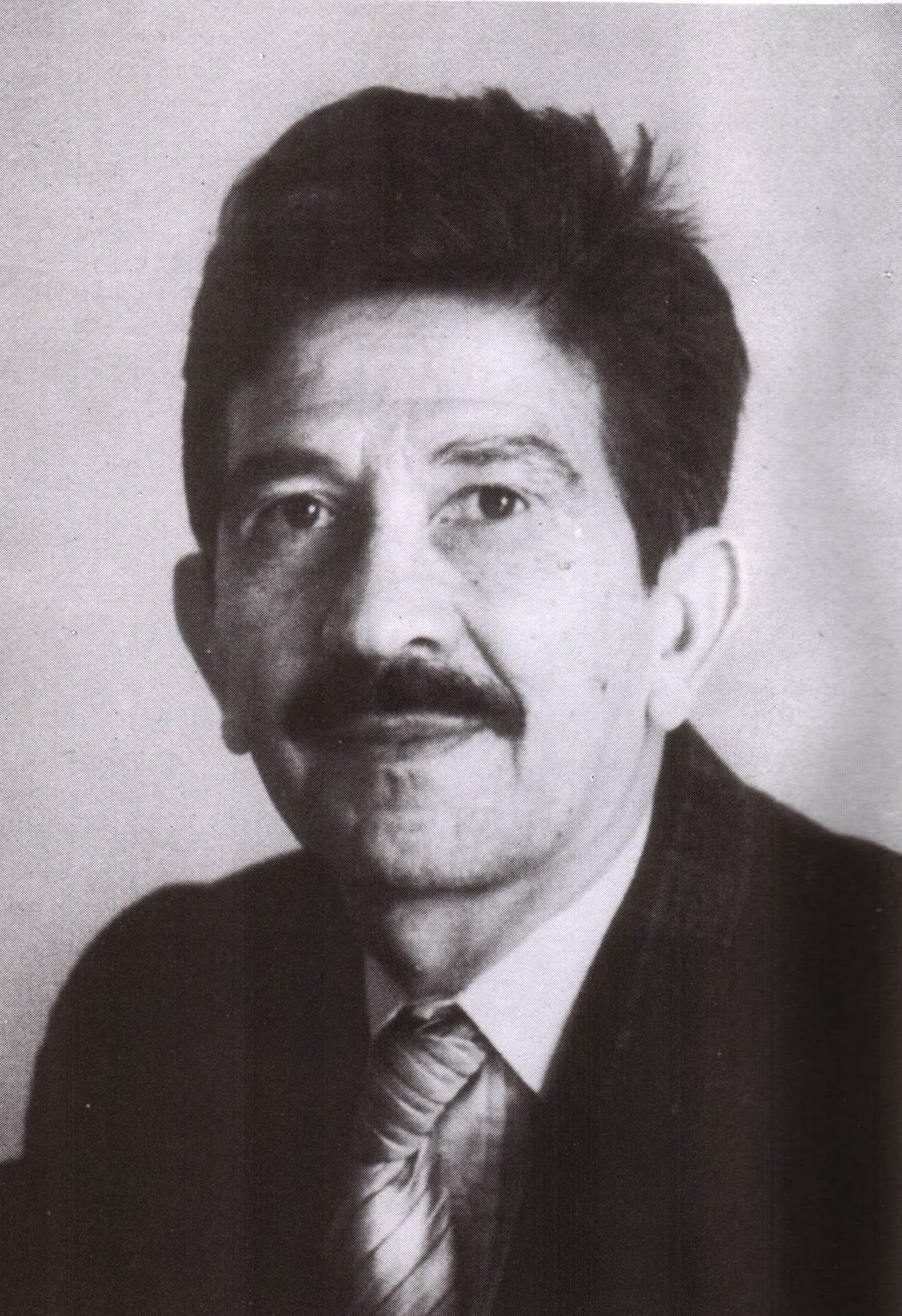
- Prominent Iranian Iranist
- Born: December 16, 1937; Isfahan
- Died: January 1997 (aged 60)
- Occupations: Writer, Iranologist

Ahmad Tafazzoli (December 16, 1937, Isfahan – January 15, 1997, Tehran) (Persian: احمد تفضلی) was an Iranian Iranist and professor of ancient Iranian languages and culture at Tehran University.

One of his most important books is Pre-Islamic Persian Literature. Jaleh Amouzegar contributed in editing it.

In January 1997, Ahmad Tafazzoli was found dead in Punak, a suburb northwest of Tehran near Jannat Abad. He was known to have contacts with Iranian academics working abroad, and many of his colleagues believed that the authorities were behind his death, as part of the chain murders of Iran. While the precise circumstances remained unclear, Tafazzoli's death created a climate of fear at the university and discouraged criticism of the government.

== See also ==
- List of unsolved murders (1980–1999)
- Persian literature

Other notable Iranologists:

- Abdolhossein Zarrinkoub
- Alireza Shapour Shahbazi
- Richard Nelson Frye
- Ehsan Yarshater
- Mehrdad Bahar
