= Shojaabad-e Pain =

Shojaabad-e Pain شجاع ابادپايين
- Village
- Location within Iran
- Coordinates: 30°46′58″N 55°50′20″E
- Country: Iran
- Province: Kerman
- County: Rafsanjan
- Bakhsh: Ferdows
- Rural District: Rezvan

Population (2006)
  - Total: 158
- Time zone: UTC+3:30 (IRST)
  - Summer (DST): UTC+4:30 (IRDT)

Shojaabad-e Pain (Persian: شجاع ابادپايين, also Romanized as Shojā‘ābād-e Pā’īn; also known as Shojā‘ābād and Shujā‘ābād) is a village in Rezvan Rural District, Ferdows District, Rafsanjan County, Kerman Province, Iran. At the 2006 census, its population was 158, in 43 families.
