= Mahmoudiyah =

Mahmoudiyah may refer to:

- Mahmoudiyah, Iraq
- Mahmoudiyah, Egypt
- Mahmoudiyah canal, a branch of the river Nile in Egypt

== See also ==
- Mahmudiyeh (disambiguation), places in Iran
