= Jaleh Amouzgar =

Iranian Iranologist and university professor

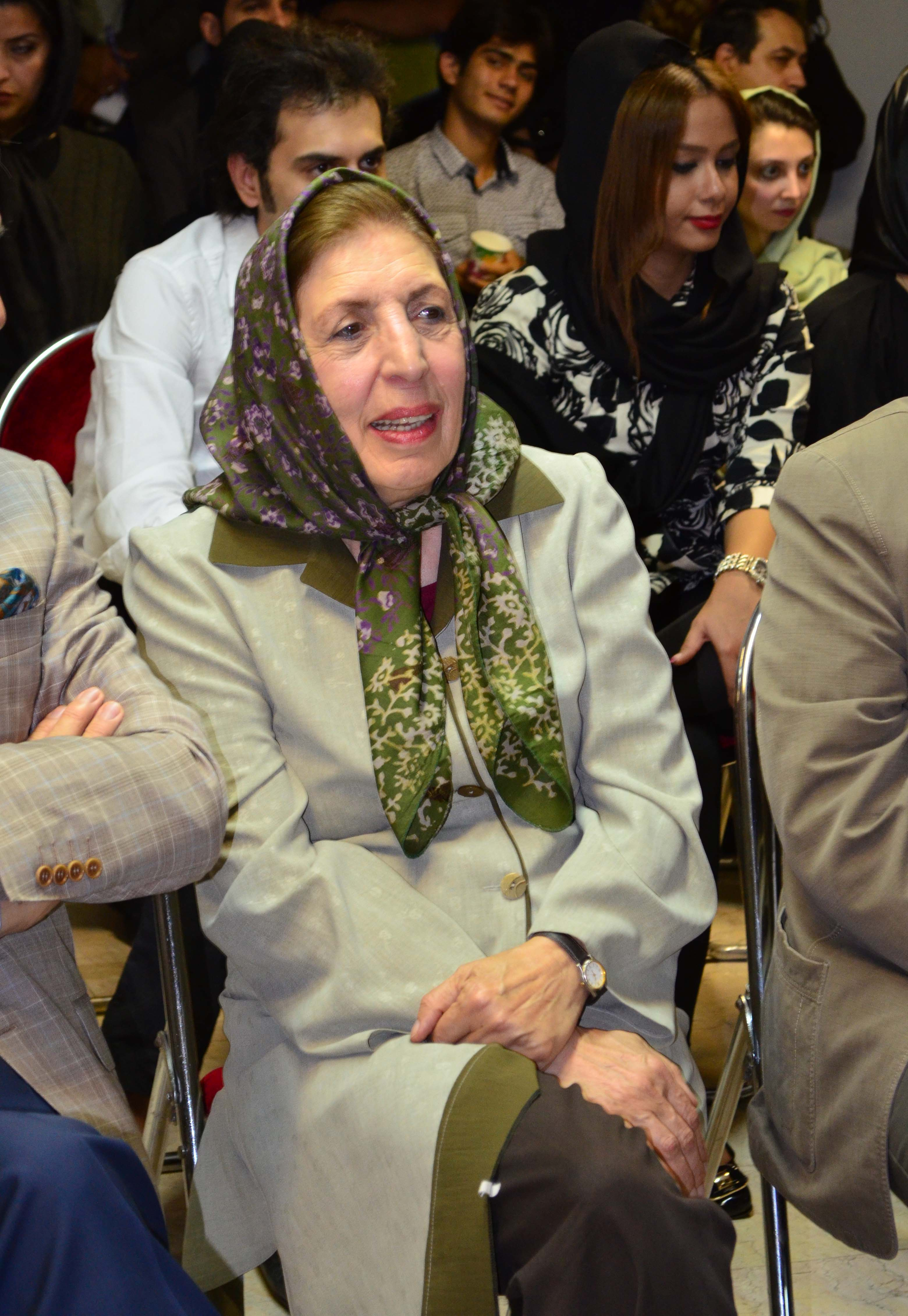
- Amouzgar in Tehran, 2013
- Born: Jaleh Amouzgar Yeganeh ژاله آموزگار یگانه; 4 December 1939 (age 86) Khoy, Iran
- Occupation: Writer, University professor
- Notable awards: Chevalier of the Legion of Honor and Persian Cypress Award

Jaleh Amouzgar L.d'H. (Persian: ژاله آموزگار; born December 4, 1939) is an Iranologist, an expert of the Middle Persian language, and a university professor.

== Life ==
Amouzgar holds a Ph.D. from Sorbonne University in Iranistics (Iranian linguistics). She was as of 2010 chairman of the department of Ancient Iranian Culture and Languages at the Tehran University.

Amouzgar, in collaboration with Ahmad Tafazzoli, has contributed significantly to Ancient Iranian studies and the history of literature in ancient Iran. She has also associated with the Encyclopædia Iranica project at Columbia University.

She has been awarded the Chevalier of the Legion of Honor and Persian Cypress Award (an Iranian Cultural Heritage Prize) in 2016.

== Works ==
- Zoroastrian myth of life
- Pahlavi language, literature and instructions
- Mythological history of Iran
- The first samples and the first man on legendary Iranian Shahriyar (translation)
- Le Cinquième Livre Du Denkard, Ahmad Tafazzuli (Translator), Peeters, 2001-01-01, ISBN 978-2-910640-09-5
