= Mahmoudieh =

Mahmoudieh (Persian: محمودیه) may refer to:

- Yasmine Mahmoudieh, Iranian architect
- Mahmoodieh, a neighbourhood in Tehran
- Al-Mirr, Ma'moudieh was the old name of this village

== See also ==
- Mahmoudiyeh F.C., a football team in Afghanistan
- Mahmud (disambiguation)
