= Safayyeh =

City in Kerman province, Iran

Safayyeh Persian: صفائیه
- City
- Location within Iran
- Coordinates: 30°49′38″N 55°48′45″E
- Country: Iran
- Province: Kerman
- County: Rafsanjan
- District: Ferdows

Population (2016)
  - Total: 2,478
- Time zone: UTC+3:30 (IRST)

Safayyeh (Persian: صفائیه) (Note: Formerly the village of Ferdowsīyeh) is a city in, and the capital of, Ferdows District of Rafsanjan County, Kerman province, Iran. It also serves as the administrative center for Ferdows Rural District.

== Demographics ==
=== Population ===
At the time of the 2006 National Census, the population was 1,961 in 499 households, when it was the village of Ferdowsiyeh in Ferdows Rural District. The following census in 2011 counted 2,233 people in 615 households, by which time the village had been elevated to city status as Safayyeh. The 2016 census measured the population of the city as 2,478 people in 758 households.
