= Jannat-e Mortazavi =

Jannat-e Mortazavi جنت مرتضوی
- Village
- Location within Iran
- Coordinates: 30°49′58″N 55°45′07″E
- Country: Iran
- Province: Kerman
- County: Rafsanjan
- Bakhsh: Ferdows
- Rural District: Ferdows

Population (2006)
  - Total: 163
- Time zone: UTC+3:30 (IRST)
  - Summer (DST): UTC+4:30 (IRDT)

Jannat-e Mortazavi (Persian: جنت مرتضوی, also Romanized as Jannat-e Mortaz̤avī; also known as Jannat and Jannatābād) is a village in Ferdows Rural District, Ferdows District, Rafsanjan County, Kerman Province, Iran. At the 2006 census, its population was 163, in 41 families.
