= Jannatabad, Buin Zahra =

Jannatabad جنت‌آباد
- Village
- Location within Iran
- Coordinates: 35°52′10″N 49°59′37″E
- Country: Iran
- Province: Qazvin
- County: Buin Zahra
- Bakhsh: Central
- Rural District: Zahray-ye Bala

Population (2006)
  - Total: 205
- Time zone: UTC+3:30 (IRST)
  - Summer (DST): UTC+4:30 (IRDT)

Jannatabad (Persian: جنت‌آباد, also Romanized as Jannatābād and Jennatābād) is a village in Zahray-ye Bala Rural District, in the Central District of Buin Zahra County, Qazvin Province, Iran. At the 2006 census, its population was 205, in 41 families.
