= Qaemiyeh-ye Sofla =

Qaemiyeh-ye Sofla قائميه سفلي
- Village
- Location within Iran
- Coordinates: 36°33′26″N 52°46′24″E
- Country: Iran
- Province: Mazandaran
- County: Amol
- Bakhsh: Dabudasht
- Rural District: Dabuy-ye Jonubi

Population (2006)
  - Total: 304
- Time zone: UTC+3:30 (IRST)
  - Summer (DST): UTC+4:30 (IRDT)

Qaemiyeh-ye Sofla (Persian: قائميه سفلي, also romanized as Qā’emīyeh-ye Soflá; also known as Qā’emīyeh) is a village in Dabuy-ye Jonubi Rural District, Dabudasht District, Amol County, Mazandaran Province, Iran. At the 2006 census, its population was 304, in 75 families.
