= Al-Mirr =

Al-Mirr المرّ / المحمودية Molendina desubter Mirabellum
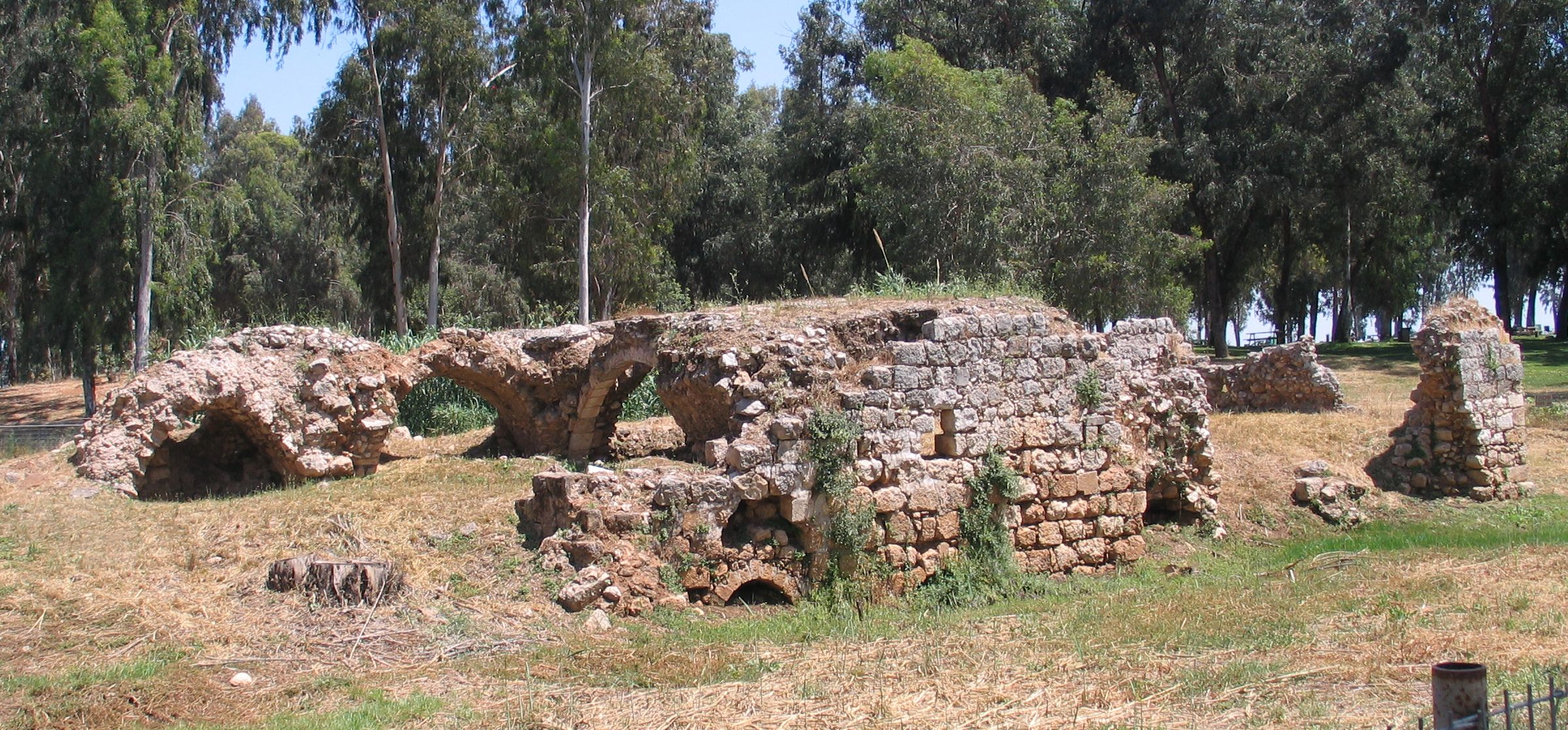
- Remains of Mill building
- Etymology: "The passage".
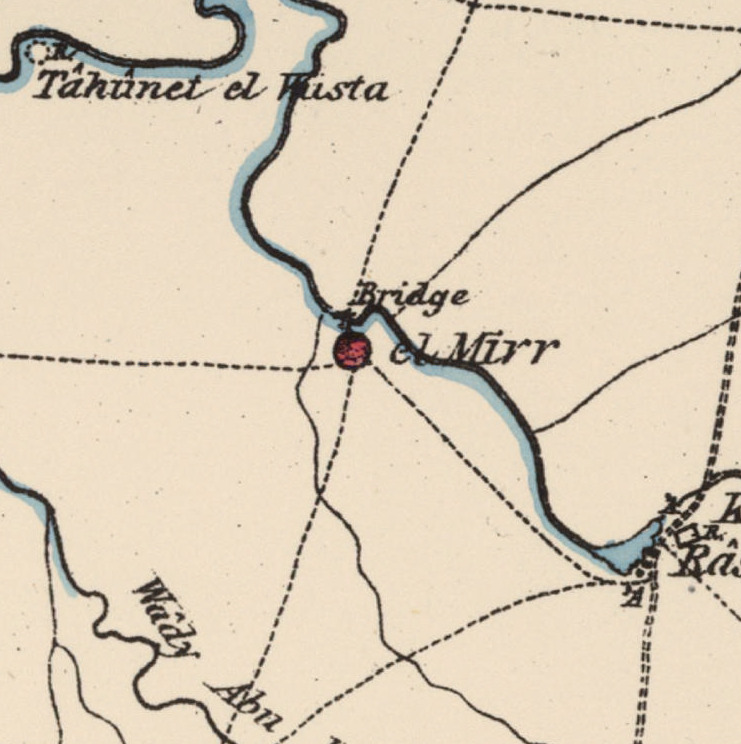
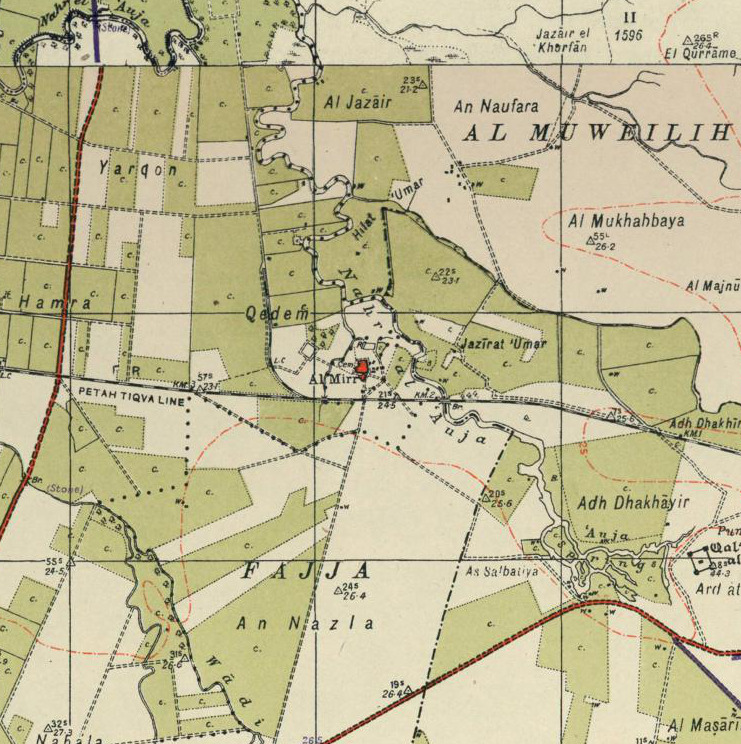
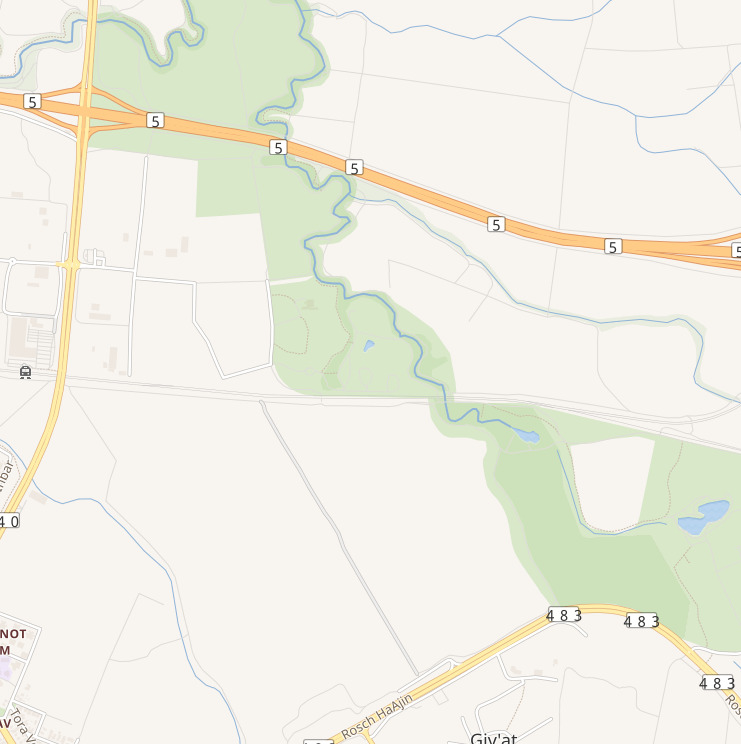
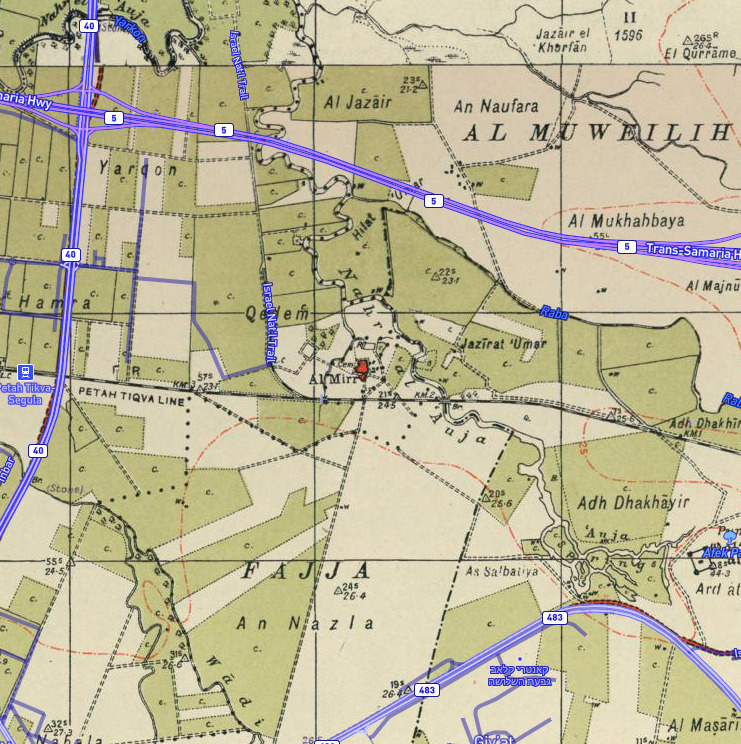
- 1870s map 1940s map modern map 1940s with modern overlay map A series of historical maps of the area around Al-Mirr (click the buttons)

- Location within Mandatory Palestine
- Coordinates: 32°06′43″N 34°54′57″E
- Palestine grid: 142/168
- Geopolitical entity: Mandatory Palestine
- Subdistrict: Jaffa
- Date of depopulation: February or March, 1948

Area
  - Total: 51 dunams (5.1 ha; 13 acres)

Population (1945)
  - Total: 170
- Cause(s) of depopulation: Fear of being caught up in the fighting

Al-Mirr, also named Mahmudiyeh ("the property of Mahmud"), was a Palestinian Arab village in the Jaffa Subdistrict, which was depopulated during the 1947–1948 Civil War in Mandatory Palestine on February 1, 1948.

== Location ==
The village was located 16.5 kilometers (10.3 mi) northeast of Jaffa, on the southern bank of the al-'Awja river. A short, secondary track linked it to the railway line running between Ras al-Ayn and Petah Tikva.

== History ==
A mill and dam built at this site in late Roman/early Byzantine period were repaired in Crusader times. The mill was mentioned in Crusader sources in 1158/9 C.E.

Excavations of the mill have recovered several 14th-century coins, which indicate that it was in use in the Mamluk period.

=== Ottoman era ===
The modern village was founded during the reign of the Mahmud II (1808–39), the Sultan of the Ottoman Empire, and was also known as "Al Mahmudiyya". In 1856 the village was named el Mir on Kiepert's map of Palestine published that year.

In 1870 Victor Guérin visited and described the village (which he called Ma'moudieh): "It contains at most two hundred inhabitants, who live in houses built of adobe. Several mills are set in motion by the cascading waterfalls along the Nahr el-A'oudjeh. A small bridge over the river makes it possible to cross it at this point". An Ottoman village list from about the same year indicated 30 houses and a population of 69, though the population count included men only.

The PEF's Survey of Western Palestine in 1882 described al-Mirr as "a small mud village, with mills close to the river."

=== British Mandate era ===
During the British Mandate for Palestine, the population was recorded as 75 Muslims in the 1922 census, and the village was classified as a hamlet in the Palestine Index Gazetteer. In the 1931 census Mahmudiya had 101 inhabitants, still all Muslims, in 25 houses.

In the 1945 statistics the population numbered 170 Muslims, who worked in agriculture and with transportation. Cultivated lands in the village in 1944-45 included 2 dunums planted with citrus and bananas, and 31 dunums planted with cereals. 2 dunams were classified as built-up areas.

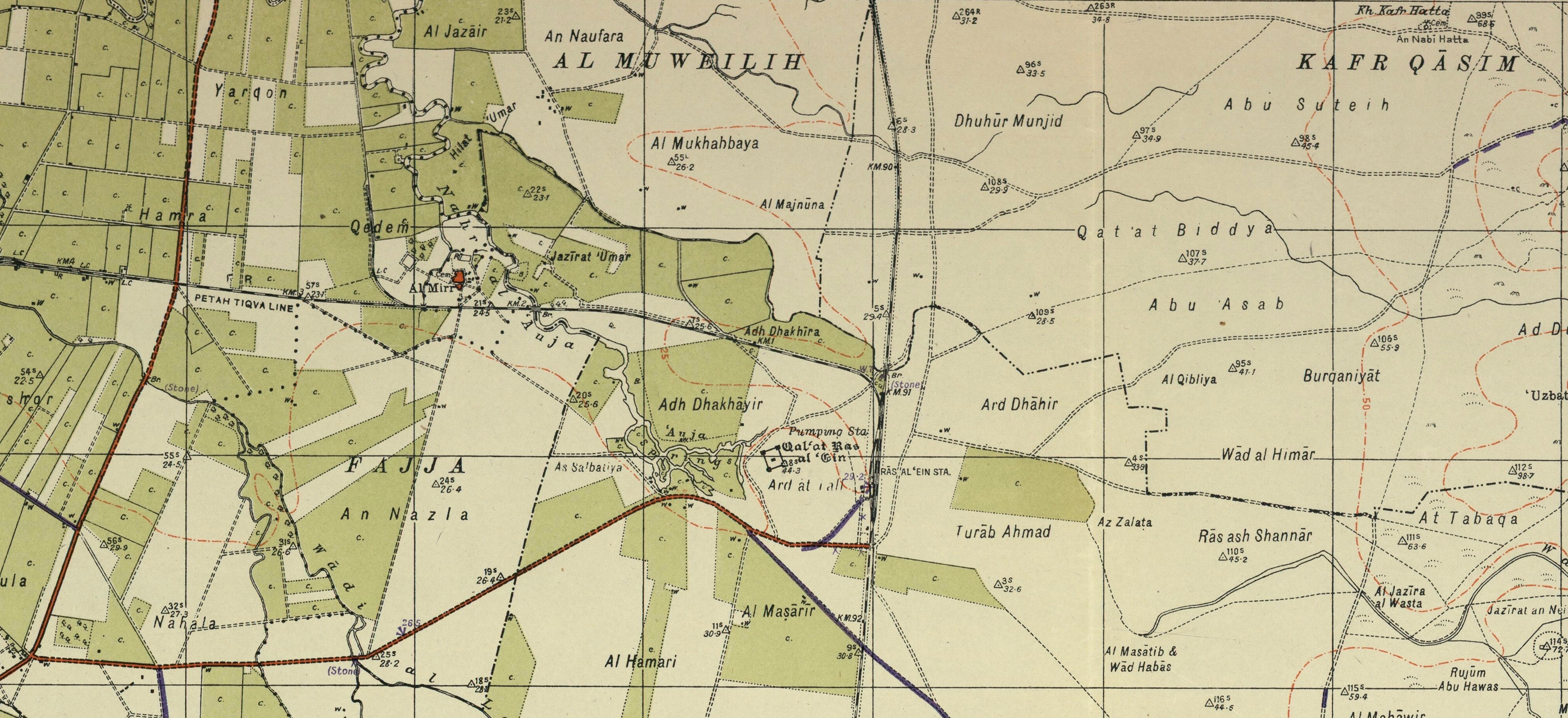
Al-Mirr 1941 1:20,000

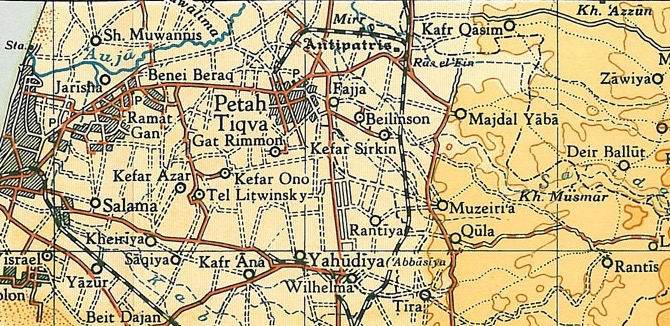
Al-Mirr 1945 1:250,000 (top centre)

=== 1948, and aftermath ===
Before the outbreak of the 1948 Arab-Israeli war, al-Mirr's inhabitants left on February 3, 1948, out of fear of Jewish attack. According to Benny Morris, some of the inhabitants returned on February 15, but fled for the final time one month later. However, according to Walid Khalidi, citing The New York Times, the villagers apparently returned yet again, as Jewish forces attacked the village in mid-May. The 13 May attack would have occurred around the same time as an attack into the area by Irgun.

The remains of a Turkish bridge lies where the village was.

Andrew Petersen, an archaeologist specializing in Islamic architecture, visited the mill in 1991. He found that it had probably been built in several phases. Presently, it consists of a rectangular building, 60 m. NS x 10 m EW, on two levels. At the lower level are at least 13 parallel water inlets. These inlets are of two different types, (indicating different construction date); a flat slab roof, and pointed vaulted roof. Between the two levels are holes in the floor, presumably this is where the millstones were connected to the turbines.

== See also ==
Old mill of Al-Mirr, presently in Yarkon-Tel Afek Park
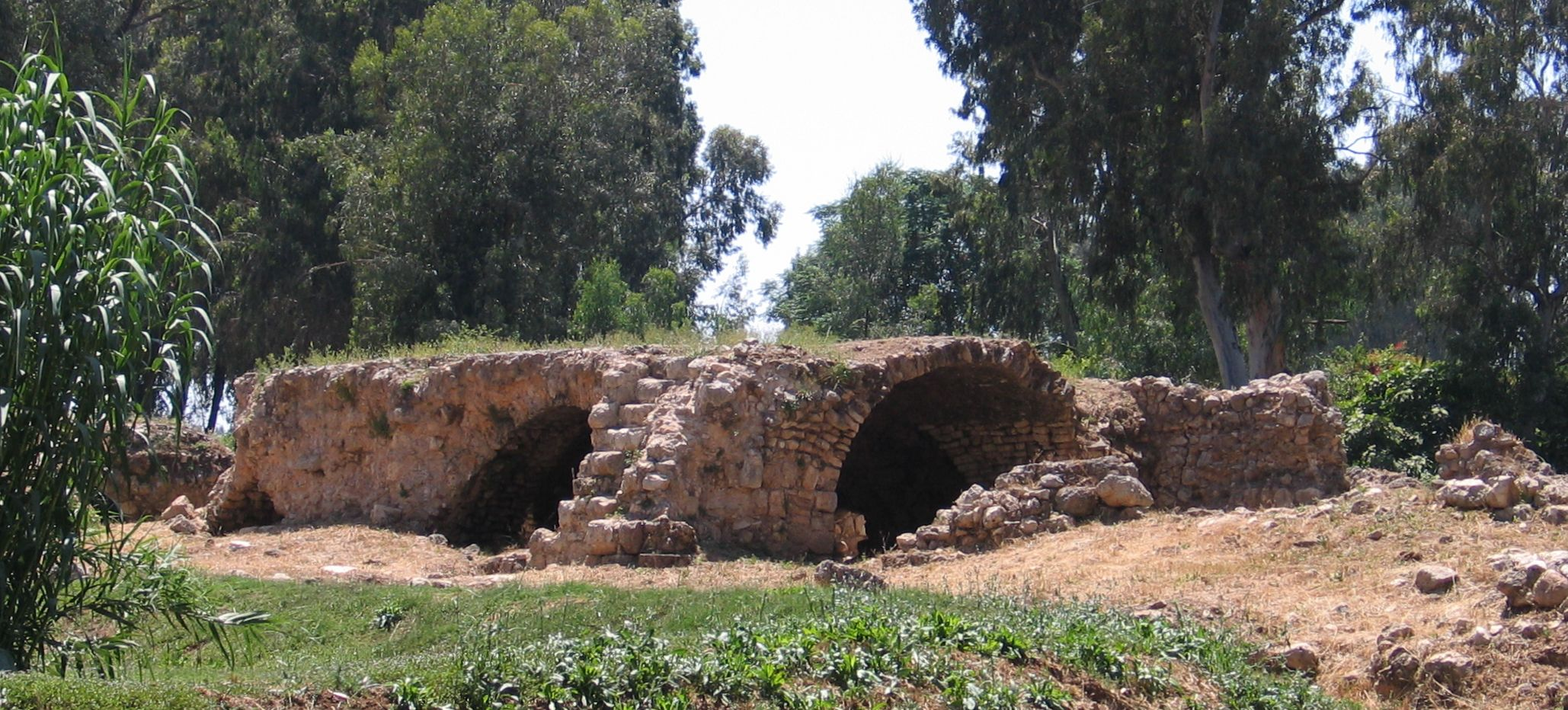

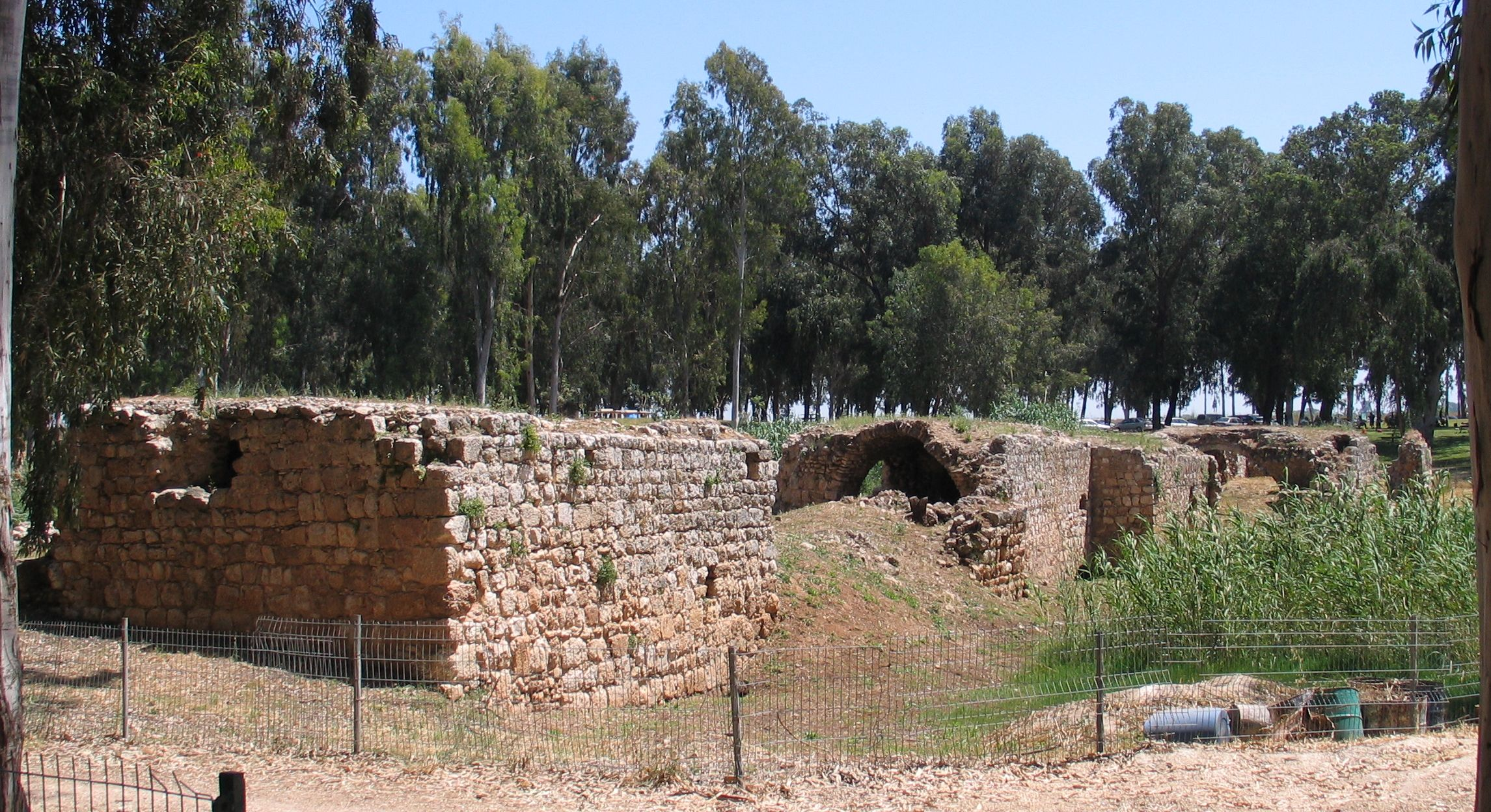

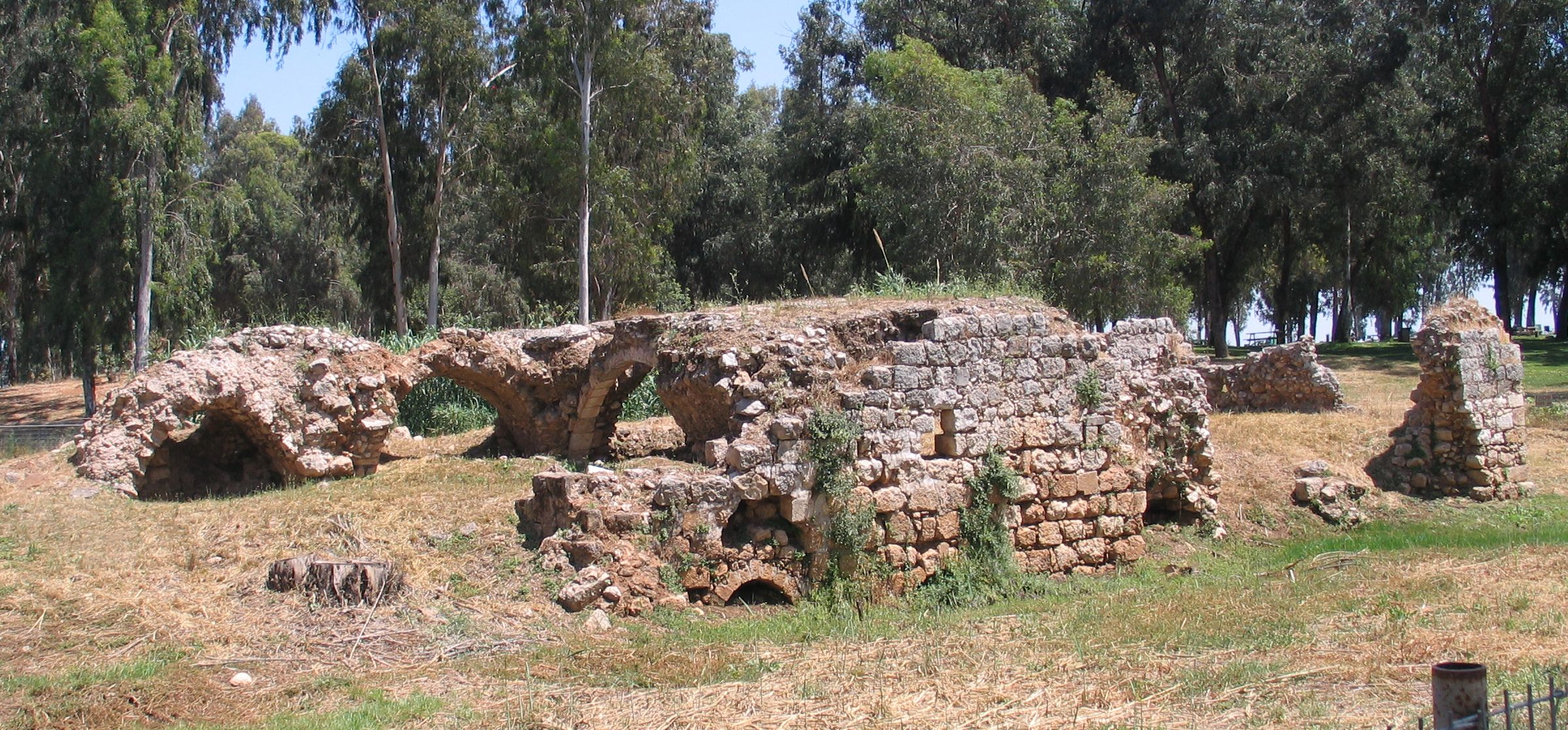

== Bibliography ==
- Barron, J.B., ed. (1923). Palestine: Report and General Abstracts of the Census of 1922. Government of Palestine.
- Clermont-Ganneau, C.S. (1895). Études d'archéologie orientale (in French). Paris: E. Bouillon. (pp. 192−196: "Les Trois−Ponts, Jorgilia")
- Conder, C.R.; Kitchener, H.H. (1882). The Survey of Western Palestine: Memoirs of the Topography, Orography, Hydrography, and Archaeology. Vol. 2. London: Committee of the Palestine Exploration Fund.
- Government of Palestine, Department of Statistics (1945). Village Statistics, April, 1945.
- Guérin, V. (1875). Description Géographique Historique et Archéologique de la Palestine (in French). Vol. 2: Samarie, pt. 2. Paris: L'Imprimerie Nationale.
- Hadawi, S. (1970). Village Statistics of 1945: A Classification of Land and Area ownership in Palestine. Palestine Liberation Organization Research Center. Archived from the original on 2018-12-08.
- Hartmann, M. (1883). "Die Ortschaftenliste des Liwa Jerusalem in dem türkischen Staatskalender für Syrien auf das Jahr 1288 der Flucht (1871)". Zeitschrift des Deutschen Palästina-Vereins. 6: 102–149.
- Khalidi, W. (1992). All That Remains: The Palestinian Villages Occupied and Depopulated by Israel in 1948. Washington D.C.: Institute for Palestine Studies. ISBN 0-88728-224-5. ISBN 0-88728-224-5.
- Morris, B. (2004). The Birth of the Palestinian Refugee Problem Revisited. Cambridge University Press. ISBN 0-521-00967-7.
- Mills, E., ed. (1932). Census of Palestine 1931. Population of Villages, Towns and Administrative Areas. Jerusalem: Government of Palestine.
- Palmer, E.H. (1881). The Survey of Western Palestine: Arabic and English Name Lists Collected During the Survey by Lieutenants Conder and Kitchener, R. E. Transliterated and Explained by E.H. Palmer. Committee of the Palestine Exploration Fund.
- Petersen, Andrew (2001). A Gazetteer of Buildings in Muslim Palestine (British Academy Monographs in Archaeology). Vol. 1. Oxford University Press. ISBN 978-0-19-727011-0. Archived from the original on 2021-05-28.
- Pringle, D. (1997). Secular buildings in the Crusader Kingdom of Jerusalem: an archaeological Gazetter. Cambridge University Press. ISBN 0521-46010-7.
- Röhricht, R. (1893). (RRH) Regesta regni Hierosolymitani (MXCVII-MCCXCI) (in Latin). Berlin: Libraria Academica Wageriana.
- Shkolnik, Y. (1994); Urban River, EGMI, 34, March–April, pp. 16–34, 71. Cited in Petersen, 2001.
- Socin, A. (1879). "Alphabetisches Verzeichniss von Ortschaften des Paschalik Jerusalem". Zeitschrift des Deutschen Palästina-Vereins. 2: 135–163.
