= Negar Mortazavi =

Iranian-American journalist (born 1981)

- Born: 1981 (age 44–45); Tehran, Iran
- Education: University of Massachusetts; Brandeis University
- Occupations: Journalist, political analyst

Negar Mortazavi (Persian: نگار مرتضوی; born 1981) is an Iranian-American journalist and political analyst based in Washington, D.C. She is the editor and host of The Iran Podcast and a senior non-resident fellow at the Center for International Policy, and writes and comments on Iranian politics and United States foreign policy towards the Middle East.

== Early life and education ==
Mortazavi was born in Tehran and has lived in the United States since 2002, having moved there as a student. She received a bachelor's degree from the University of Massachusetts and a master's degree in international development from Brandeis University. She has not returned to Iran since 2009, and has said that she is unable to do so because of her work as a journalist.

== Career ==
Early in her career Mortazavi worked for the United Nations Development Programme in New York and for the International Center for Journalists in Washington, D.C. From 2010 to 2014 she was a television reporter and presenter for the Persian and English services of Voice of America, where she hosted Straight Talk (Rooye Khat), a daily interactive current affairs programme. Her interviewees included the United States Under Secretary of the Treasury David S. Cohen and the State Department's Persian-language spokesman Alan Eyre.

In January 2014 Mortazavi joined the National Iranian American Council as director of Persian and new media, a post she held for several months. Later that year she crowdfunded a reporting trip to Brazil, where she covered the Iran national football team at the 2014 FIFA World Cup on Twitter.

In 2020 she launched The Iran Podcast, a series of interviews on Iranian politics, society and culture, which is produced as a programme of the Center for International Policy, where she is a senior non-resident fellow.

She has commented widely on the Israeli and American strikes on Iran of June 2025 and on the wider war that began in February 2026. She told Al Jazeera in July 2025 that Benjamin Netanyahu had "found a formula where it is able to attack Iran with impunity despite pushback from Donald Trump", and, speaking on Democracy Now!, described the attack of February 2026 as "another regime change war in the Middle East", begun without a vote of the United States Congress.

== Harassment and threats ==
Press freedom organisations have reported that Mortazavi has been the subject of sustained online harassment. The Committee to Protect Journalists (CPJ) and the Coalition For Women In Journalism have described campaigns of abuse, defamation and threats directed at her and at other women journalists and analysts in the Iranian diaspora, originating both from supporters of the Iranian government and from some opposition groups abroad.

In 2019 Mortazavi examined a recently created Twitter account, Iran Disinfo, that was attacking Iranian and Iranian-American journalists, academics and analysts, among them Mortazavi herself, and established that the project behind it was funded by the Global Engagement Center of the United States Department of State. She wrote that the account was using "my own tax money to attack and smear me". The State Department suspended the project's funding at the end of May 2019, and by early June the remainder of its $1.5 million grant had been terminated.

In October 2022 a University of Chicago Institute of Politics panel on the protests in Iran at which Mortazavi was to speak was moved online after the institute received a bomb threat; it had previously received telephone calls and emails accusing her of ties to the Iranian government, which she denied. CPJ condemned the threat as "a crude attempt at censorship", said that the accusations sent to the institute were false, and called on the authorities to investigate.

== Recognition ==
The Center for Strategic and International Studies included Mortazavi in its 2021 United States national security and foreign affairs leadership list, and she appeared the same year in a Forbes feature on inspirational women. She was named a next-generation leader in foreign policy and national security by the New America Foundation in 2020, and a European Young Leader by the Brussels think tank Friends of Europe in 2017. In 2014 The Guardian named her one of ten people to follow on Twitter for news and commentary on Iran. The Middle East Policy Council has also listed her among forty leaders under forty shaping United States–Middle East relations.
