= Jannatabad, Arzuiyeh =

Jannatabad جنت‌آباد
- Village
- Location within Iran
- Coordinates: 28°20′06″N 56°25′53″E
- Country: Iran
- Province: Kerman
- County: Arzuiyeh
- Bakhsh: Central
- Rural District: Arzuiyeh

Population (2006)
  - Total: 345
- Time zone: UTC+3:30 (IRST)
  - Summer (DST): UTC+4:30 (IRDT)

Jannatabad (Persian: جنت‌آباد, also Romanized as Jannatābād and Jenatābād) is a village in Arzuiyeh Rural District, in the Central District of Arzuiyeh County, Kerman Province, Iran. At the 2006 census, its population was 345, in 80 families.
