= Mahmudiyeh, Bardsir =

Mahmudiyeh محموديه
- Village
- Location within Iran
- Coordinates: 29°57′00″N 56°34′00″E
- Country: Iran
- Province: Kerman
- County: Bardsir
- Bakhsh: Central
- Rural District: Negar

Population (2006)
  - Total: 8
- Time zone: UTC+3:30 (IRST)
  - Summer (DST): UTC+4:30 (IRDT)

Mahmudiyeh (Persian: محموديه, also Romanized as Maḩmūdīyeh; also known as Mahmū’īyeh) is a village in Negar Rural District, in the Central District of Bardsir County, Kerman Province, Iran. At the 2006 census, its population was 8, in 6 families.
