= Yadollah Mortazavi =

Professor in chemical engineering

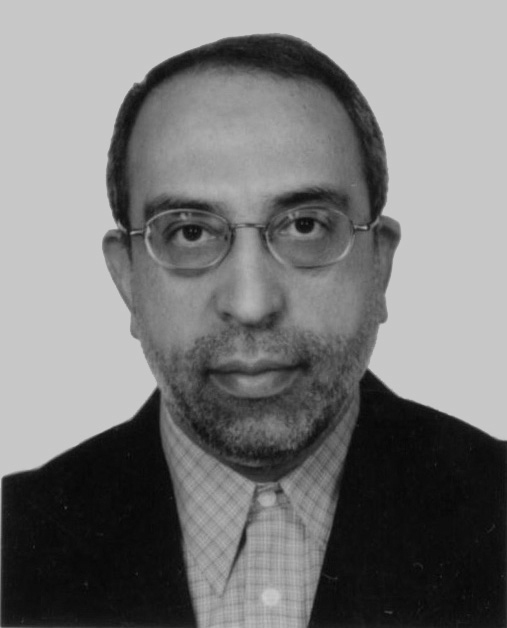
- Born: March 21, 1958 (age 68); Touyserkan, Hamedan, Iran
- Education: Shiraz University; University of Waterloo
- Known for: Catalysis; Reaction engineering Chemical gas-sensors
- Scientific career
- Fields: Chemical Engineering
- Workplaces: University of Tehran
- Doctoral advisor: P. L. Silveston; R. R. Hudgins
- Website: cans.ut.ac.ir

Yadollah Mortazavi (born 21 March 1958) is a professor of chemical engineering at the University of Tehran and is a leading researcher in the field of reaction engineering and heterogeneous catalysis.
