= Jannatabad, Narmashir =

Jannatabad جنت‌آباد
- Village
- Location within Iran
- Coordinates: 28°54′37″N 58°41′30″E
- Country: Iran
- Province: Kerman
- County: Narmashir
- Bakhsh: Central
- Rural District: Azizabad

Population (2006)
  - Total: 792
- Time zone: UTC+3:30 (IRST)
  - Summer (DST): UTC+4:30 (IRDT)

Jannatabad (Persian: جنت‌آباد, also Romanized as Jannatābād) is a village that is located in the Azizabad Rural District, in the Central District of Narmashir County, Kerman Province, Iran. At the 2006 census, its population was 792, in 158 families.
