= Qaemiyeh-ye Do =

Qaemiyeh-ye Do قايميه 2
- Village
- Location within Iran
- Coordinates: 30°29′12″N 56°02′54″E
- Country: Iran
- Province: Kerman
- County: Rafsanjan
- Bakhsh: Central
- Rural District: Azadegan

Population (2006)
  - Total: 188
- Time zone: UTC+3:30 (IRST)
  - Summer (DST): UTC+4:30 (IRDT)

Qaemiyeh-ye Do (Persian: قايميه 2, also Romanized as Qā’emīyeh-ye Do; also known as Kāmiāb and Qā’emīyeh) is a village in Azadegan Rural District, in the Central District of Rafsanjan County, Kerman Province, Iran. At the 2006 census, its population was 188, in 43 families.
