= Jannatabad-e Yek =

Jannatabad-e Yek جنت‌آباد 1
- Village
- Location within Iran
- Coordinates: 29°07′21″N 55°44′43″E
- Country: Iran
- Province: Kerman
- County: Sirjan
- Bakhsh: Central
- Rural District: Golestan

Population (2006)
  - Total: 91
- Time zone: UTC+3:30 (IRST)
  - Summer (DST): UTC+4:30 (IRDT)

Jannatabad-e Yek (Persian: جنت‌آباد 1, also Romanized as Jannatābād-e Yek; also known as Jannatābād-e Nāderī) is a village in Golestan Rural District, in the Central District of Sirjan County, Kerman Province, Iran. At the 2006 census, its population was 91, in 29 families.
