= Jannatabad, Mud =

Jannatabad جنت‌آباد
- Village
- Location within Iran
- Coordinates: 32°24′54″N 59°37′44″E
- Country: Iran
- Province: South Khorasan
- County: Sarbisheh
- Bakhsh: Mud
- Rural District: Naharjan

Population (2006)
  - Total: 44
- Time zone: UTC+3:30 (IRST)
  - Summer (DST): UTC+4:30 (IRDT)

Jannatabad (Persian: جنت‌آباد, also Romanized as Jannatābād; also known as Kalāt-e Jadīd, Kalāteh Jadīd, Kalāteh Jadīn, Kalāteh-ye Jadīd, Kalāteh-ye Jadīn, and Kalkastūn) is a village in Naharjan Rural District, Mud District, Sarbisheh County, South Khorasan Province, Iran. At the 2006 census, its population was 44, in 12 families.
