= Shojaabad, Lorestan =

Shojaabad شجاع‌آباد
- Village
- Location within Iran
- Coordinates: 33°35′57″N 48°20′44″E
- Country: Iran
- Province: Lorestan
- County: Khorramabad
- Bakhsh: Central
- Rural District: Robat

Population (2006)
  - Total: 278
- Time zone: UTC+3:30 (IRST)
  - Summer (DST): UTC+4:30 (IRDT)

Shojaabad (Persian: شجاع‌آباد, also Romanized as Shojā‘ābād) is a village in Robat Rural District, in the Central District of Khorramabad County, Lorestan Province, Iran. At the 2006 census, its population was 278, in 56 families.
