= Shojaabad, East Azerbaijan =

Shojaabad شجاع‌آباد
- Village
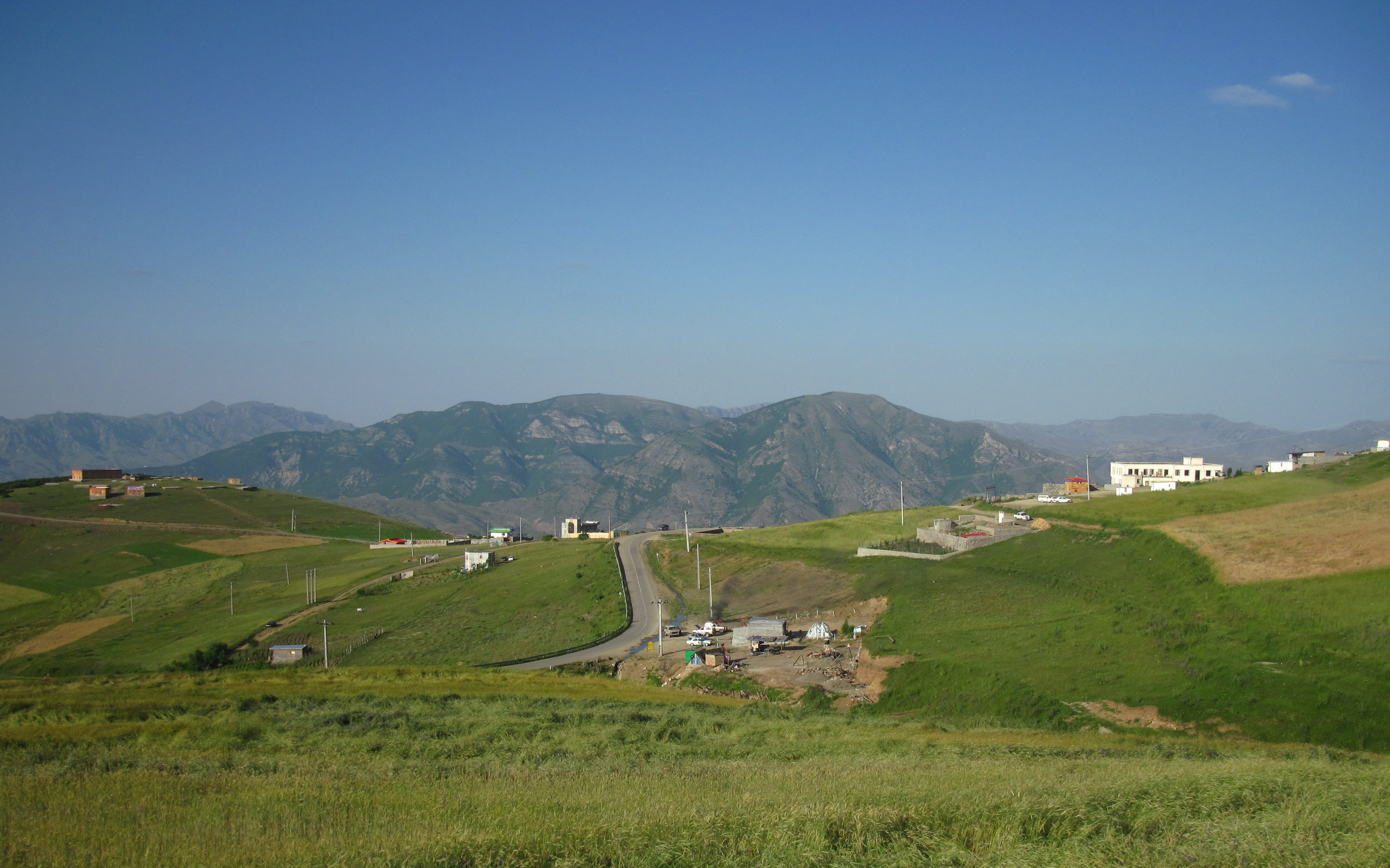
- Village view in July 2013

- Location within Iran
- Coordinates: 38°51′47″N 46°57′54″E
- Country: Iran
- Province: East Azerbaijan
- County: Kaleybar
- Bakhsh: Central
- Rural District: Misheh Pareh

Population (2006)
  - Total: 73
- Time zone: UTC+3:30 (IRST)
  - Summer (DST): UTC+4:30 (IRDT)

Shojaabad (Persian: شجاع‌آباد, also Romanized as Shojā‘ābād) is a village in Misheh Pareh Rural District, in the Central District of Kaleybar County, East Azerbaijan Province, Iran. At the 2006 census, its population was 73, in 21 families.

== Situation ==
Online edition of the Dehkhoda Dictionary, quoting Iranian Army files, reports a population of 67 people in late 1940s. At the 2006 census, its population was 73, in 21 families. According to a more recent statistics (2012) the population is 80 people in 22 families.

Due to the proximity to Babak Fort the village is already experiencing a rapid growth.
