= Shojaabad-e Mohammad Ali =

Shojaabad-e Mohammad Ali شجاع ابادمحمدعلي
- Village
- Location within Iran
- Coordinates: 30°29′50″N 57°48′18″E
- Country: Iran
- Province: Kerman
- County: Kerman
- Bakhsh: Shahdad
- Rural District: Takab

Population (2006)
  - Total: 221
- Time zone: UTC+3:30 (IRST)
  - Summer (DST): UTC+4:30 (IRDT)

Shojaabad-e Mohammad Ali (Persian: شجاع ابادمحمدعلي, also Romanized as Shojā‘ābād-e Moḩammad ʿAlī; also known as Seh Jāābād, Shojā‘ābād-e Moḩammad Qolī, and Shojā‘ābād-e Shomālī) is a village in Takab Rural District, Shahdad District, Kerman County, Kerman Province, Iran. At the 2006 census, its population was 221, in 53 families.
