= Qaemiyeh-ye Olya =

Qaemiyeh-ye Olya قائميه عليا
- Village
- Location within Iran
- Coordinates: 36°33′26″N 52°30′05″E
- Country: Iran
- Province: Mazandaran
- County: Amol
- Bakhsh: Dabudasht
- Rural District: Dabuy-ye Jonubi

Population (2006)
  - Total: 439
- Time zone: UTC+3:30 (IRST)
  - Summer (DST): UTC+4:30 (IRDT)

Qaemiyeh-ye Olya (Persian: قائميه عليا, also Romanized as Qā’emīyeh-ye ‘Olyā; also known as Qā’emīyeh) is a village in Dabuy-ye Jonubi Rural District, Dabudasht District, Amol County, Mazandaran Province, Iran. At the 2006 census, its population was 439, in 112 families.
