= Shojaabad, Kerman =

Shojaabad شجاع‌آباد
- Village
- Location within Iran
- Coordinates: 30°27′43″N 57°49′03″E
- Country: Iran
- Province: Kerman
- County: Kerman
- Bakhsh: Shahdad
- Rural District: Takab

Population (2006)
  - Total: 94
- Time zone: UTC+3:30 (IRST)
  - Summer (DST): UTC+4:30 (IRDT)

Shojaabad (Persian: شجاع‌آباد, also Romanized as Shojā‘ābād; also known as Shojā‘ābād-e Jonūbī) is a village in Takab Rural District, Shahdad District, Kerman County, Kerman Province, Iran. At the 2006 census, its population was 94, in 25 families.
