= Rezvan Rural District (Rafsanjan County) =

Rural district in Kerman province, Iran

Rezvan Rural District Persian: دهستان رضوان
- Rural District
- Location within Iran
- Coordinates: 30°43′53″N 55°52′03″E
- Country: Iran
- Province: Kerman
- County: Rafsanjan
- District: Ferdows
- Capital: Esmailabad

Population (2016)
  - Total: 4,201
- Time zone: UTC+3:30 (IRST)

Rezvan Rural District (Persian: دهستان رضوان) is in Ferdows District of Rafsanjan County, Kerman province, Iran. Its capital is the village of Esmailabad.

== Demographics ==
=== Population ===
At the time of the 2006 National Census, the rural district's population was 8,070 in 2,044 households. There were 8,068 inhabitants in 2,343 households at the following census of 2011. The 2016 census measured the population of the rural district as 10,668 in 3,327 households. The most populous of its 53 villages was Esmailabad, with 4,201 people.
