= Jannat Abad =

Jannat Abad جنت‌آباد
- District
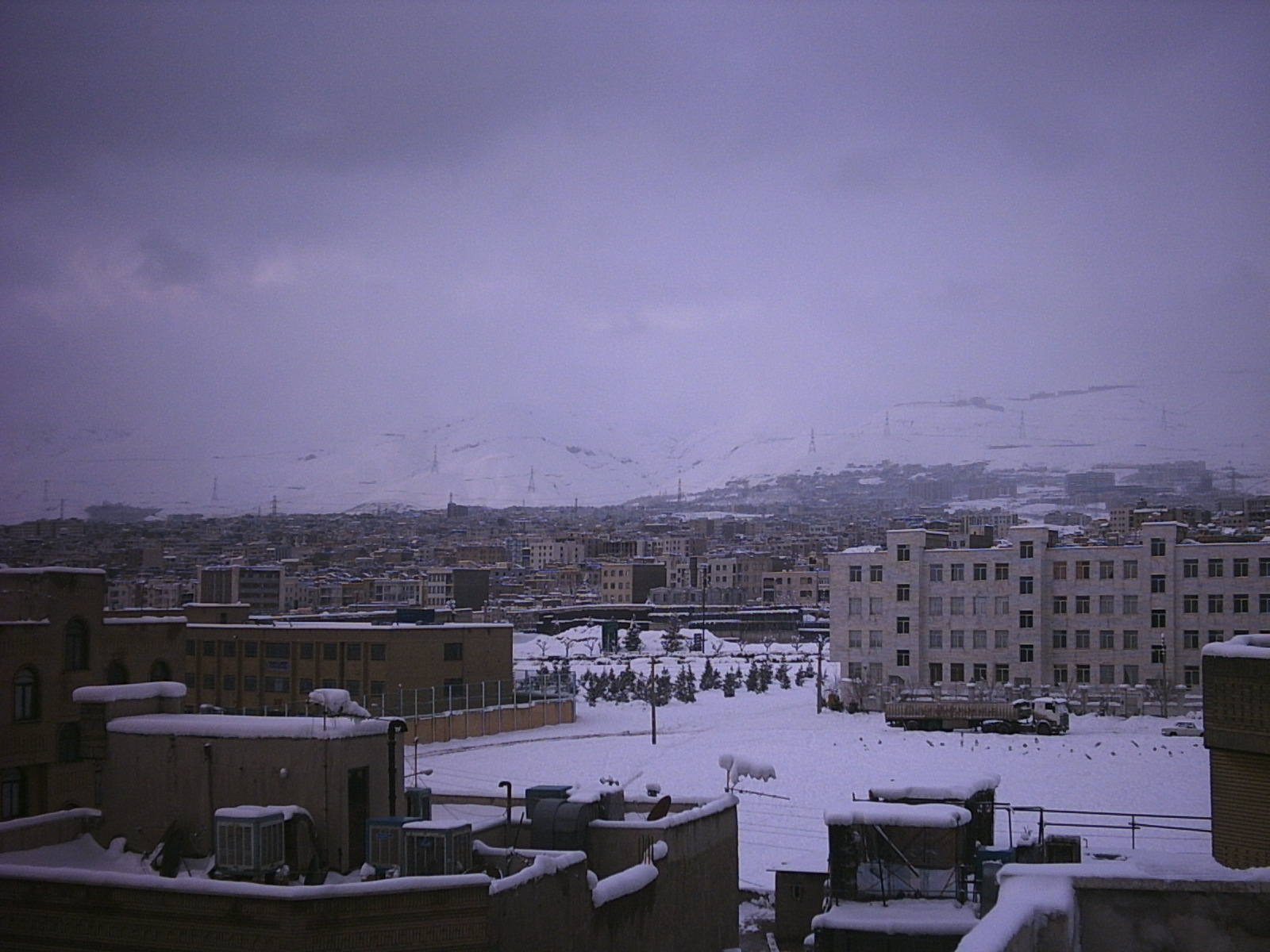

- Location within Iran
- Coordinates: 35°45′9″N 51°18′17″E
- Increase of apartments in North Jannat Abad: 1990

Government
  - Manager (District 5): Mr. Mahmoud Kalohori (2020)

Population (2021)
  - Total: 78,759 about

Jannat Abad (Persian: جنت‌آباد) is a large neighbourhood in Tehran, Iran. It is an area around the Jannat Abad Street located in North West Tehran. Jannat Abad street starts from Ayatollah Kashani Freeway. It has several squares. The most famous one is Chahar Bagh. Jannat Abad Blvd has a South segment that is below the cross with Hemmat Freeway and North part that is located upon Hemmat and links to the Marzdaran Freeway.

== Reason for naming Janat Abad ==
Janatabad was known by this name in the past because of its heavenly climate. The rivers Kan, Sulqan, Wardavard, the springs of Bagh Feyz and several aqueducts passed through Janatabad and made this area one of the suburbs of Tehran. Pomegranate and cherry trees, which are the heritage of gardens of many years, are still visible in the back alleys of this neighborhood.

In the past, there were several rivers in the neighborhood that were used by the residents of the surrounding gardens for water and irrigation. Due to the abundance of water and the natural irrigation of the gardens, this neighborhood had greenery and a good climate, which is why it was named Jannat. Later it was renamed "Janatabad" meaning the paradise area, which is still This area due to its distance from the city center and the lack of high traffic and not being in charge of important government organs; It is a quiet, habitable and calming area with pleasant weather that even in the most polluted days of Tehran, Janatabad has a relatively clean air than other areas.

Most of the lands and gardens of this neighborhood belonged to a famous person named "Nizam Mafi" whose school and mosque are among his relics. He transferred the ownership of these lands to government organizations and the people. At first, this neighborhood was inhabited. There were workers who worked in factories in the west of Tehran, but with the Islamic Revolution, the growth of construction in this area began in earnest, and the houses in this neighborhood, due to their cheapness, attracted the attention of new immigrants to the capital. The multi-storey apartments replaced the cherry orchards and dried up the rivers far from the neighborhood, and by 2016, due to the suitability of the houses, many immigrants from all over Tehran and Iran entered the neighborhood, but after It was controlled by adjusting the population price.
