= Jannatabad, Rafsanjan =

Jannatabad جنت‌آباد
- Village
- Location within Iran
- Coordinates: 30°24′19″N 55°52′13″E
- Country: Iran
- Province: Kerman
- County: Rafsanjan
- Bakhsh: Central
- Rural District: Eslamiyeh

Population (2006)
  - Total: 328
- Time zone: UTC+3:30 (IRST)
  - Summer (DST): UTC+4:30 (IRDT)

Jannatabad (Persian: جنت‌آباد, also Romanized as Jannatābād; also known as Bahrābād, Jannat, Jannatābād-e Hūmeh, and Jannat Abad Hoomeh) is a village in Eslamiyeh Rural District, in the Central District of Rafsanjan County, Kerman Province, Iran. At the 2006 census, its population was 328, in 82 families.
