= Ferdows Rural District (Rafsanjan County) =

Rural district in Kerman province, Iran

Ferdows Rural District Persian: دهستان فردوس
- Rural District
- Location within Iran
- Coordinates: 30°48′55″N 55°46′41″E
- Country: Iran
- Province: Kerman
- County: Rafsanjan
- District: Ferdows
- Capital: Safayyeh

Population (2016)
  - Total: 5,874
- Time zone: UTC+3:30 (IRST)

Ferdows Rural District (Persian: دهستان فردوس) is in Ferdows District of Rafsanjan County, Kerman province, Iran. It is administered from the city of Safayyeh. (Note: Formerly the village of Ferdowsiyeh)

== Demographics ==
=== Population ===
At the time of the 2006 National Census, the rural district's population was 6,889 in 1,785 households. There were 5,517 inhabitants in 1,641 households at the following census of 2011. The 2016 census measured the population of the rural district as 5,874 in 1,812 households. The most populous of its 47 villages was Mehdiabad, with 1,590 people.
