= Ferdows District =

District in Kerman province, Iran

Ferdows District Persian: بخش فردوس
- District
- Location within Iran
- Coordinates: 30°46′16″N 55°48′37″E
- Country: Iran
- Province: Kerman
- County: Rafsanjan
- Capital: Safayyeh

Population (2016)
  - Total: 19,020
- Time zone: UTC+3:30 (IRST)

Ferdows District (Persian: بخش فردوس) is in Rafsanjan County, Kerman province, Iran. Its capital is the city of Safayyeh. (Note: Formerly the village of Ferdowsiyeh)

== History ==
After the 2006 National Census, the village of Ferdowsiyeh was elevated to city status as Safayyeh.

== Demographics ==
=== Population ===
At the time of the 2006 National Census, the district's population was 14,959 in 3,829 households. The following census in 2011 counted 15,818 people in 4,599 households. The 2016 census measured the population of the district as 19,020 inhabitants in 5,897 households.

=== Administrative divisions ===
Ferdows District Population
Administrative Divisions	2006	2011	2016
Ferdows RD	6,889	5,517	5,874
Rezvan RD	8,070	8,068	10,668
Safayyeh (city)		2,233	2,478
Total	14,959	15,818	19,020
RD = Rural District
