= Kazkan =

Village in South Khorasan, Iran

Kazkan كازكان
- Village
- Location within Iran
- Coordinates: 33°23′24″N 60°04′48″E
- Country: Iran
- Province: South Khorasan
- County: Zirkuh
- Bakhsh: Central
- Rural District: Zirkuh

Population (2006)
  - Total: 33
- Time zone: UTC+3:30 (IRST)
  - Summer (DST): UTC+4:30 (IRDT)

Kazkan (Persian: كازكان, also Romanized as Kāzkān and Gāzgān; also known as Kāzgūn and Qal‘eh Khājgau) is a village in Zirkuh Rural District, Central District, Zirkuh County, South Khorasan Province, Iran. At the 2006 census, its population was 33, in 10 families. It is an isolated village in the desert, north of Manvand and Gomenj and west of Dezg-e Bala, but has a small green area under cultivation to provide for the villagers.
