= Manavand, Zirkuh =

Manavand مناوند
- Village
- Location within Iran
- Coordinates: 33°21′58″N 60°02′59″E
- Country: Iran
- Province: South Khorasan
- County: Zirkuh
- Bakhsh: Central
- Rural District: Zirkuh

Population (2006)
  - Total: 91
- Time zone: UTC+3:30 (IRST)
  - Summer (DST): UTC+4:30 (IRDT)

Manavand (Persian: مناوند, also Romanized as Manāvand and Menāvand; also known as Manāwād and Mīnābād) is a village in Zirkuh Rural District, Central District, Zirkuh County, South Khorasan Province, Iran. At the 2006 census, its population was 91, in 24 families. It is an isolated village in the desert, north of Gomenj and west of Dezg-e Bala, but has a small green area under cultivation to provide for the villagers.
