= Nezumand =

Nezumand نزومند
- Village
- Location within Iran
- Coordinates: 33°18′00″N 60°04′09″E
- Country: Iran
- Province: South Khorasan
- County: Zirkuh
- Bakhsh: Central
- Rural District: Zirkuh

Population (2006)
  - Total: 185
- Time zone: UTC+3:30 (IRST)
  - Summer (DST): UTC+4:30 (IRDT)

Nezumand (Persian: نزومند, also Romanized as Nez̧ūmand and Nez̧āmand) is a village in Zirkuh Rural District, Central District, Zirkuh County, South Khorasan Province, Iran. As of the 2006 census, its population was 185, in 52 families.
