= Ardakul =

Village in South Khorasan province, Iran

Ardakul Persian: اردكول
- Village
- Location within Iran
- Coordinates: 33°29′11″N 60°02′36″E
- Country: Iran
- Province: South Khorasan
- County: Zirkuh
- District: Central
- Rural District: Zirkuh

Population (2016)
  - Total: 355
- Time zone: UTC+3:30 (IRST)

Ardakul (Persian: اردكول) (Note: Also romanized as Ardakool, Ardakūl, and Ardekūl; also known as Adkalā, Ardehkūl, and Qalat Atkhul) is a village in Zirkuh Rural District of the Central District in Zirkuh County, South Khorasan province, Iran.

== Demographics ==
=== Population ===
At the time of the 2006 National Census, the village's population was 445 in 126 households, when it was in the former Zirkuh District of Qaen County. The following census in 2011 counted 382 people in 121 households. The 2016 census measured the population of the village as 355 people in 110 households, by which time the district had been separated from the county in the establishment of Zirkuh County. The rural district was transferred to the new Central District.
