= Hoseynabad-e Pain, South Khorasan =

Village in South Khorasan province, Iran

Hoseynabad-e Pain Persian: حسين ابادپائين
- Village
- Location within Iran
- Country: Iran
- Province: South Khorasan
- County: Zirkuh
- District: Central
- Rural District: Zirkuh

Population (2016)
  - Total: 127
- Time zone: UTC+3:30 (IRST)

Hoseynabad-e Pain (Persian: حسين ابادپائين) (Note: Also romanized as Ḩoseynābād-e Pā’īn; also known as Ḩoseynābād) is a village in Zirkuh Rural District of the Central District in Zirkuh County, South Khorasan province, Iran.

== Demographics ==
=== Population ===
At the time of the 2006 National Census, the village's population was 125 in 36 households, when it was in Shaskuh Rural District of the former Zirkuh District in Qaen County. The following census in 2011 counted 126 people in 38 households. The 2016 census measured the population of the village as 127 people in 37 households, by which time the district had been separated from the county in the establishment of Zirkuh County. The rural district was transferred to the new Shaskuh District, and the village was transferred to Zirkuh Rural District in the new Central District.
