= Moinabad, South Khorasan =

Moinabad معين اباد
- Village
- Location within Iran
- Coordinates: 33°20′34″N 60°07′37″E
- Country: Iran
- Province: South Khorasan
- County: Zirkuh
- Bakhsh: Central
- Rural District: Zirkuh

Population (2006)
  - Total: 17
- Time zone: UTC+3:30 (IRST)
  - Summer (DST): UTC+4:30 (IRDT)

Moinabad (Persian: معين اباد, also Romanized as Mo‘īnābād; also known as Bonyābād, Meynābād, and Qal‘eh Mainābād) is a village in Zirkuh Rural District, Central District, Zirkuh County, South Khorasan Province, Iran. At the 2006 census, its population was 17, in 4 families.
