= Mohammadabad, Zirkuh =

Village in South Khorasan province, Iran

Mohammadabad Persian: محمداباد
- Village
- Location within Iran
- Coordinates: 33°28′17″N 60°07′35″E
- Country: Iran
- Province: South Khorasan
- County: Zirkuh
- District: Central
- Rural District: Zirkuh

Population (2016)
  - Total: 367
- Time zone: UTC+3:30 (IRST)

Mohammadabad (Persian: محمداباد) (Note: Also romanized as Moḩammadābād; also known as Mahmūdābād) is a village in Zirkuh Rural District of the Central District in Zirkuh County, South Khorasan province, Iran.

== Demographics ==
=== Population ===
At the time of the 2006 National Census, the village's population was 852 in 198 households, when it was in the former Zirkuh District of Qaen County. The following census in 2011 counted 423 people in 102 households. The 2016 census measured the population of the village as 367 people in 98 households, by which time the district had been separated from the county in the establishment of Zirkuh County. The rural district was transferred to the new Central District.
