= Dustabad-e Bala =

Village in South Khorasan province, Iran

Dustabad-e Bala Persian: دوست ابادبالا
- Village
- Location within Iran
- Country: Iran
- Province: South Khorasan
- County: Zirkuh
- District: Central
- Rural District: Zirkuh

Population (2016)
  - Total: 100
- Time zone: UTC+3:30 (IRST)

Dustabad-e Bala (Persian: دوست ابادبالا) (Note: Also romanized as Dūstābād-e Bālā; also known as Dūstābād) is a village in Zirkuh Rural District of the Central District in Zirkuh County, South Khorasan province, Iran.

== Demographics ==
=== Population ===
At the time of the 2006 National Census, the village's population was 95 in 30 households, when it was in Shaskuh Rural District of the former Zirkuh District in Qaen County. The following census in 2011 counted 108 people in 35 households. The 2016 census measured the population of the village as 100 people in 37 households, by which time the district had been separated from the county in the establishment of Zirkuh County. The rural district was transferred to the new Shaskuh District, and the village was transferred to Zirkuh Rural District in the new Central District.
