= Sij-e Jadid =

Village in South Khorasan province, Iran

Sij-e Jadid Persian: سيج جديد
- Village
- Location within Iran
- Country: Iran
- Province: South Khorasan
- County: Zirkuh
- District: Central
- Rural District: Zirkuh

Population (2016)
  - Total: 60
- Time zone: UTC+3:30 (IRST)

Sij-e Jadid (Persian: سيج جديد) (Note: Also romanized as Sīj-e Jadīd; also known as Sīch) is a village in Zirkuh Rural District of the Central District in Zirkuh County, South Khorasan province, Iran.

== Demographics ==
=== Population ===
At the time of the 2006 National Census, the village's population was 87 in 24 households, when it was in Shaskuh Rural District of the former Zirkuh District in Qaen County. The following census in 2011 counted 86 people in 25 households. The 2016 census measured the population of the village as 60 people in 17 households, by which time the district had been separated from the county in the establishment of Zirkuh County. The rural district was transferred to the new Shaskuh District, and the village was transferred to Zirkuh Rural District in the new Central District.
