= Hasanabad, Zirkuh =

Village in South Khorasan province, Iran

Hasanabad Persian: حسن‌آباد
- Village
- Location within Iran
- Coordinates: 33°29′23″N 60°06′14″E
- Country: Iran
- Province: South Khorasan
- County: Zirkuh
- District: Central
- Rural District: Zirkuh

Population (2016)
  - Total: 574
- Time zone: UTC+3:30 (IRST)

Hasanabad (Persian: حسن اباد) (Note: Also romanized as Ḩasanābād) is a village in Zirkuh Rural District of the Central District in Zirkuh County, South Khorasan province, Iran.

== Demographics ==
=== Population ===
At the time of the 2006 National Census, the village's population was 664 in 147 households, when it was in the former Zirkuh District of Qaen County. The following census in 2011 counted 665 people in 169 households. The 2016 census measured the population of the village as 574 people in 147 households, by which time the district had been separated from the county in the establishment of Zirkuh County. The rural district was transferred to the new Central District.
