= Bamrud =

Village in South Khorasan province, Iran

Bamrud Persian: بمرود
- Village
- Location within Iran
- Coordinates: 33°38′24″N 60°04′44″E
- Country: Iran
- Province: South Khorasan
- County: Zirkuh
- District: Central
- Rural District: Zirkuh

Population (2016)
  - Total: 1,195
- Time zone: UTC+3:30 (IRST)

Bamrud (Persian: بمرود) (Note: Also romanized as Bamrūd and Bemrood; also known as Banamrūd) is a village in Zirkuh Rural District of the Central District in Zirkuh County, South Khorasan province, Iran.

== Demographics ==
=== Population ===
At the time of the 2006 National Census, the village's population was 961 in 198 households, when it was in the former Zirkuh District of Qaen County. The following census in 2011 counted 922 people in 228 households. The 2016 census measured the population of the village as 1,195 people in 314 households, by which time the district had been separated from the county in the establishment of Zirkuh County. The rural district was transferred to the new Central District. Bamrud was the most populous village in its rural district.
