= Pishbar =

Village in South Khorasan province, Iran

Pishbar Persian: پيشبر
- Village
- Location within Iran
- Coordinates: 33°23′19″N 59°58′44″E
- Country: Iran
- Province: South Khorasan
- County: Zirkuh
- District: Central
- Rural District: Zirkuh

Population (2016)
  - Total: 374
- Time zone: UTC+3:30 (IRST)

Pishbar (Persian: پيش بر) (Note: Also romanized as Pīshbar) is a village in Zirkuh Rural District of the Central District in Zirkuh County, South Khorasan province, Iran.

== Demographics ==
=== Population ===
At the time of the 2006 National Census, the village's population was 575 in 136 households, when it was in the former Zirkuh District of Qaen County. The following census in 2011 counted 717 people in 201 households. The 2016 census measured the population of the village as 374 people in 126 households, by which time the district had been separated from the county in the establishment of Zirkuh County. The rural district was transferred to the new Central District.
