= Gozokht =

Village in South Khorasan province, Iran

Gozokht Persian: گزخت
- Village
- Location within Iran
- Coordinates: 33°14′49″N 60°19′42″E
- Country: Iran
- Province: South Khorasan
- County: Zirkuh
- District: Central
- Rural District: Zirkuh

Population (2016)
  - Total: 854
- Time zone: UTC+3:30 (IRST)

Gozokht (Persian: گزخت) (Note: Also romanized as Gazokht; also known as Kozokht and Qalat Gujat) is a village in Zirkuh Rural District of the Central District in Zirkuh County, South Khorasan province, Iran.

== Demographics ==
=== Population ===
At the time of the 2006 National Census, the village's population was 699 in 135 households, when it was in the former Zirkuh District of Qaen County. The following census in 2011 counted 828 people in 207 households. The 2016 census measured the population of the village as 854 people in 196 households, by which time the district had been separated from the county in the establishment of Zirkuh County. The rural district was transferred to the new Central District.
