= Kalateh-ye Naser =

Kalateh-ye Naser كلاته ناصر
- Village
- Location within Iran
- Coordinates: 33°19′36″N 60°08′51″E
- Country: Iran
- Province: South Khorasan
- County: Zirkuh
- Bakhsh: Central
- Rural District: Zirkuh

Population (2006)
  - Total: 12
- Time zone: UTC+3:30 (IRST)
  - Summer (DST): UTC+4:30 (IRDT)

Kalateh-ye Naser (Persian: كلاته ناصر, also Romanized as Kalāteh-ye Nāşer; also known as Nāşer and Qal‘eh Nasir) is a village in Zirkuh Rural District, Central District, Zirkuh County, South Khorasan Province, Iran. At the 2006 census, its population was 12, in 5 families.
