= Taj Kuh, Zirkuh =

Taj Kuh تاجكوه
- Village
- Location within Iran
- Coordinates: 33°30′47″N 60°03′14″E
- Country: Iran
- Province: South Khorasan
- County: Zirkuh
- Bakhsh: Central
- Rural District: Zirkuh

Population (2006)
  - Total: 188
- Time zone: UTC+3:30 (IRST)
  - Summer (DST): UTC+4:30 (IRDT)

Taj Kuh (Persian: تاجكوه, also Romanized as Tāj Kūh) is a village in Zirkuh Rural District, Central District, Zirkuh County, South Khorasan Province, Iran. At the 2006 census, its population was 188, in 39 families.
