= Darj =

Darj may refer to:

- Darj-e Olya, a village in Zirkuh Rural District, South Khorasan Province, Iran
- Darj-e Sofla, another village in Zirkuh Rural District, South Khorasan Province, Iran
- Max Darj (born 1991), Swedish handball player
