= Shushk, Zirkuh =

Shushk شوشك
- Village
- Location within Iran
- Coordinates: 33°18′20″N 60°09′18″E
- Country: Iran
- Province: South Khorasan
- County: Zirkuh
- Bakhsh: Central
- Rural District: Zirkuh

Population (2006)
  - Total: 49
- Time zone: UTC+3:30 (IRST)
  - Summer (DST): UTC+4:30 (IRDT)

Shushk (Persian: شوشك, also Romanized as Shūshk; also known as Qal‘eh Sūsak and Shūshak) is a village in Zirkuh Rural District, Central District, Zirkuh County, South Khorasan Province, Iran. At the 2006 census, its population was 49, in 14 families.
