= Shushk =

Shushk (Persian: شوشك) may refer to:

- Shushk, Khusf, South Khorasan
- Shushk, Zirkuh, South Khorasan
