= Jimabad, Zirkuh =

Jimabad جيم اباد
- Village
- Location within Iran
- Coordinates: 33°27′55″N 59°57′42″E
- Country: Iran
- Province: South Khorasan
- County: Zirkuh
- Bakhsh: Central District
- Rural District: Zirkuh

Population (2006)
  - Total: 94
- Time zone: UTC+3:30 (IRST)
  - Summer (DST): UTC+4:30 (IRDT)

Jimabad (Persian: جيم اباد, also Romanized as Jīmābād) is a village in Zirkuh Rural District, Central District, Zirkuh County, South Khorasan Province, Iran. At the 2006 census, its population was 94, in 29 families.
