= Kortabad, South Khorasan =

Kortabad كرت اباد
- Village
- Location within Iran
- Coordinates: 33°24′06″N 60°11′37″E
- Country: Iran
- Province: South Khorasan
- County: Zirkuh
- Bakhsh: Central
- Rural District: Zirkuh

Population (2006)
  - Total: 207
- Time zone: UTC+3:30 (IRST)
  - Summer (DST): UTC+4:30 (IRDT)

Kortabad (Persian: كرت اباد, also Romanized as Kortābād and Kartābād) is a village in Zirkuh Rural District, Central District, Zirkuh County, South Khorasan Province, Iran. At the 2006 census, its population was 207, in 43 families.
