= Daraj-e Sofla =

Daraj-e Sofla (Persian: دارج سفلی or دراج سفلی) may refer to:

- Daraj-e Sofla, East Azerbaijan (دراج سفلی - Darāj-e Soflá)
- Daraj-e Sofla, South Khorasan (دارج سفلی - Dāraj-e Soflá)
