= Jimabad =

Jimabad (Persian: جيم اباد) may refer to:

- Jimabad, Razavi Khorasan
- Jimabad, Birjand, South Khorasan Province
- Jimabad, Zirkuh, South Khorasan Province
