= Kartabad =

Kartabad or Kortabad (Persian: كرت اباد) may refer to:

- Kartabad, Lorestan, Iran
- Kortabad, South Khorasan, Iran
