= Daraj-e Bala =

Daraj-e Bala may refer to:

- Daraj
- Darj-e Bala
