= Darj-e Olya =

Darj-e Olya دارج عليا
- Village
- Location within Iran
- Coordinates: 33°23′40″N 60°10′17″E
- Country: Iran
- Province: South Khorasan
- County: Zirkuh
- Bakhsh: Central District
- Rural District: Zirkuh

Population (2006)
  - Total: 98
- Time zone: UTC+3:30 (IRST)
  - Summer (DST): UTC+4:30 (IRDT)

Darj-e Olya (Persian: دارج عليا, also Romanized as Dārj-e ‘Olyā and Dāraj-e ‘Olyā; also known as Dārīj-e Bālā, Dāraj-e Bālā, Darj Bālā, and Qal‘eh Dārīj Bāla) is a village in Zirkuh Rural District, Central District, Zirkuh County, South Khorasan Province, Iran. At the 2006 census, its population was 98, in 25 families.
