= Gomenj =

Gomenj گمنج
- Village
- Location within Iran
- Coordinates: 33°18′43″N 60°05′13″E
- Country: Iran
- Province: South Khorasan
- County: Zirkuh
- Bakhsh: Central District
- Rural District: Zirkuh

Population (2006)
  - Total: 101
- Time zone: UTC+3:30 (IRST)
  - Summer (DST): UTC+4:30 (IRDT)

Gomenj (Persian: گمنج, also Romanized as Kowmenj and Gowmenj; also known as Gomīn, Gūmeh, and Gūmī) is a village in Zirkuh Rural District, Central District, Zirkuh County, South Khorasan Province, Iran. At the 2006 census, its population was 101, in 30 families.
