= Taj Kuh =

Taj Kuh (Persian: تاج كوه) may refer to:

- Taj Kuh, Birjand, South Khorasan Province
- Taj Kuh, Zirkuh, South Khorasan Province
- Taj Kuh, Yazd
