= Nina Aleshina =

Russian architect

Nina Alexandrovna Aleshina
- circa 1980
- Born: 17 July 1924; Moscow, Russian Soviet Federative Socialist Republic, Soviet Union
- Died: 17 November 2012 (aged 88); Moscow, Russia
- Other names: Nina Alexandrovna Alyoshina, Nina Alyoshina, Nina Aleshina
- Occupation: architect
- Years active: 1950-2012
- Known for: Moscow Metro

Nina Aleksandrovna Aleshina (Russian: Нина Александровна Алёшина, pronounced [ˈnʲinɐ ɐlʲɪˈksandrəvnɐ ɐˈlʲɵʂɨnə]; July 17, 1924 – November 17, 2012) was a Russian architect and head of the design department Metrogiprotrans for the Moscow Metro for a decade. Nineteen stations of the subway system were projects she participated in or led. She was honored with many awards during her career, including the designation in 1985 of Honored Architect of the Russian Soviet Federative Socialist Republic

== Early life ==
Nina Aleksandrovna was born on 17 July 1924 in Moscow, Russian Soviet Federative Socialist Republic, Soviet Union. She was the granddaughter of the Archpriest of the Church of the Resurrection of Christ at Tarusa, Nikolai Uspensky, (Russian: Николай Успенский) and his wife Nadezhda Danilovna Yakhontova (Russian: Надежда Даниловна Яхонтова), whose children became intellectuals and musicians. She graduated from music school in the same year that the German invasion of Russia occurred. She studied piano, before studying architecture at the Moscow Institute of Architecture under the tutelage of Boris Mezentsev, graduating in 1950.

== Career ==
Aleshina began her career in the workshop of Alexey Dushkin, working on drawings for the renovation of the Novoslobodskaya station, which had been completed years before. She focused on wall and pylon treatments, while her husband, the artist Nikolai Aleshin worked in their home sketching images for stained glass. She designed the vestibule of the station, which led into two lobbies. It was the first project of twenty she was involved in for the Moscow subway system.

At the end of the Khrushchev era, Aleshina almost quit working on the metro, but changed her mind. From 1981 to 1991, Aleshina served as the chief architect of the Institute of Metrogiprotrans. It was difficult, as she was serving as the head of the design department for the entire metro system, while still completing her own designs. Aleshina visited construction sites daily to keep the architects and the builders working together and she had a reputation as a perfectionist, who insisted on performance, but who was also highly respected by the engineers and foremen she worked with.

In her later career, Aleshina wrote a history, documenting design details, and the unique features of each station in the subway system for the Moscow Heritage Committee.

== Death and recognition ==
Aleshina died in Moscow on 17 November 2012 and was buried on Vvedenskoye Cemetery next to her husband and daughter. In addition to prizes recognizing her work, she was honored as a Knight of the Order of the Badge of Honour and received the Medal "For Labour Valour".

== Projects ==
The Moscow Metro Station project began in 1931 and the challenge was given to designers to plan spaces which overcame the feeling of being underground and instead managed to artistically provide a space which was functional and able to move trains and people efficiently, yet aesthetically pleasing. Initially, natural materials were predominant, but after 1958, Metrogiprotrans turned to concrete, paint and tile. In the early period, most of the lobby entrances were through larger buildings, but in the austerity movement of the 1950s, a change was made to smaller, pavilion structures. Throughout the 1960s, utilitarian prefabricated structures dominated, but their size increased as the 1970s dawned. The shallow column design, nicknamed the "centipede" because of its ribbed beam ceilings across a central hall with two rows of columns, was the typical design style of most of the stations. Though Aleshina changed the shapes of the columns and decorative treatments in the stations she designed, it was a challenge to make each station original, as upon descending the entrance to the platform the 150-meter-long ribbed ceiling was always what first caught passengers' eyes.

=== 1950s and 1960s projects ===
1962, Leninsky Prospekt station, was a collaboration by Aleshina with lead architect Aleksandr Strelkov and Yury Vdovin, Valentina Polikarpova (Russian: В. Г. Поликарпова), and Anna Marova (Russian: А. А. Марова). The design was simple, featuring an above ground pavilion made completely of glass, shaded by a wide eave above which was a decorative concrete lattice. Descending into the deep covered escalator, the design used an overlapping step technique rather than a curved cylindrical vault keeping with the step design of the platform area. Pillars, which widened as they ascended, flanked the hallway. The square columns were faced with light colored marble and were narrower on the sides running the length of the hall than on the wider sides facing the platforms. Underneath each pillar was a yellowish-brown "mat" of marble. The walls were tiled in a diamond shaped grid with light colored ceramic tiles. The floor was composed of gray and brown granite of intentionally irregular shape.

1962, Oktyabrskaya station, also known as the "October" station, was another joint design project by Aleshina with Strelkov and Vdovin. The design was reflective of Soviet Modernism in the 1960s. The station featured a wide, sloping canopy over the glass entrance. The front façade was divided into the glassed area and an open brickwork lattice with alternating vertical and horizontal holes. The pylons of the platform hall, which sloped and widened near the top, were lined with light-colored marble. Above the posts were cornices, where the lighting fixtures were mounted. Tiled walls of black and white lined the track and the flooring was tiled with gray and red granite.

1962, Profsoyuznaya station, also known as the "Trade Union" station teamed Aleshina and Nikolai I. Demchinskii for the project. There was no above ground lobby built. Access came through descending from either Profsoyuznaya Street or Nakhimovsky Prospekt Avenue. It was a prefabricated structure built to a standard design plan. The hallway featured 40 columns faced with wavy, blue-gray marble. The platform walls along the tracks were made of white glazed ceramic tiles set on a diagonal above a black base of horizontal tiles. The floor was paved with red and gray granite.

1966, Ryazansky Prospekt station was a collaboration by Aleshina and Yury Vdovin, which had a two small lobbies on Ryazan Avenue. It was not precast to the standard specifications, but instead was a narrower version of the typical station. Square columns, lined with blue-gray marble from Ufaley flanked the hallway. Around each column was a "mat" of red marble, but the rest of the floor was paved with gray granite. The track walls were covered in white ceramic tiles above a black base and were capped with red ornamentation which reflected a typical pattern used on doilies or woven work from the Ryazan region.

1966, Taganskaya station was a joint design project by Aleshina with Yury Vdovin and sculptor Eduard M. Ladygin (Russian: Эдуард Михайлович Ладыгин). The columns in the hallway were lined with light-colored marble, bordered in red marble, with walls of black and white ceramic tiles. Lighting was hidden behind the eaves. Embossed panels on the walls, made by Ladigin represented the theme of "The Conquest of Space". The floor paving was gray and red granite.

1969, Varshavskaya station, also known as the "Warsaw" station, teamed Aleshina and Natalya K. Samoilova (Russian: Наталья Константиновна Самойлова). Construction began in 1969 and extensively utilized Gazgan marble, which naturally transitions in color gradation from cream to black, to create a polychrome expanse, which was broken by rows of columns that were wide at the header and tapered, diminishing in size toward the base.

=== 1970s projects ===
1972, Oktyabrskoye Pole station, also known as the "October field" station, was a collaboration by Aleshina with L. N. Zaytseva (Russian: Л. Н.Зайцева) and Latvian sculptors Džems Bodnieks and Heim M. Rysin. The underground passages were accessed from People's Militia and Marshal Birjuzova streets. The hallway featured fluted columns encased in aluminum, which were set atop a gray granite flooring strip. The rest of the floor paving was white marble. Walls along the track were black marble at the base and transitioned to a light gray marble for the main surface. Affixed to the walls were inserts sculpted in anodized aluminum by Bodniek and Rysin featuring Soviet themes.

1975, Kuznetsky Most station was another joint design project with Samoilova, as well as with the artist Mikhail N. Alekseev (Russian: Михаил Н. Алексеев). The station design utilized arcades of columns and arches, evoking supports on a viaduct, formed of blue-gray, grained marble. The walls on the accompanying track were decorated with inlays of wrought aluminum depicting blacksmithing, such as sparks flying from an anvil, the tongs and hammer of the forge, weapons and tools which a smith might use or create in his work. Soft fluorescent lighting in a ribbed rhomboid structure were placed in the ceiling arch to illuminate the walkways, The architects were awarded the Prize of the USSR by the Council of Ministers, in 1977.

1975, Lubyanka station was a renovation of a project originally completed in 1935 by Nikolai Ladovsky. Aleshina and Strelkov were hired to reconstruct "Dzerzhinskaya" station, connecting it to the new Kuznetsky Most station and creating an actual station with a central hall. Because of the degraded conditions of the original site, the two circular concrete cylinders which had been built for the trains, were replaced with steel tubing. The soil surrounding the site was a type of quicksand which required the engineers to freeze it to a depth of thirty meters before construction could begin. Though criticized for not remaining true to the original design, Aleshina explained that the original barrel shape of the station was impractical and the tunnel diameters were too small to join with the more modern stations. She also explained that the style of it would not have worked well with the addition of a central hall. The grey marble, which had originally lined the cylinders was replaced with white tiling, though a fragment of the former tunnel was retained. The pillars of the station were lined in white marble and the flooring was paved with black and red granite.

1975, Shchukinskaya station, like Kuznetsky Most station, teamed Aleshina with Samoilova and Alekseev. The design featured fluted columns of yellowish Gazgan marble in which the vertical grooves were filled with an anodized aluminum and bronze alloy. The floor detailing featured a gray granite in an open chain traveling the length of the hallway and the walls were lined with red Ukrainian marmor. Affixed to the walls were corrugated aluminum panels of the same anodized aluminum and bronze. It was the first time the material had been used on such a large scale, as previously, it was used to prohibit corrosion on helicopter blades.

1978, Medvedkovo station was another collaboration of Aleshina and Natalya K. Samoilova and with participation by V. S. Volovich (Russian: В. С. Волович) and again featured artworks by M. N. Alekseev. The prefabricated structure featured rows of 26 columns, lined in yellow and pink grained marble which had stainless steel inserts. Track walls were lined with red marble and featured anodized aluminum and bronze panels with pyramid-shaped forms to signify ice. The theme of the station was northern nature and decorative inserts in the metal panels depicted scenes of the environment. Alekseev's sculpted inserts showed various images including geese in flight, a hunter taking aim at geese and another hunting bear, a polar bear on an ice floe, a sled pulled by reindeer, and other images. The flooring was gray and black granite paving.

1979, Marksistskaya station also known as the "Marxist" station was a joint design project with Volovich and Samoilova with participation by R. P. Tkacheva (Russian: Р. П. Ткачёва) and the artist Alekseev. The station was one of Aleshina's personal favorites and she described it as the "most beautiful subway in the world". The design of the station was supposed to convey the strength and purity of Marxist ideology. In that vein, the hall of the station was faced with red Burovshina marble on the columns and a pink Gazgan marble on the walls with black granite at the base. The pink and red marble came from the area near Lake Baikal. Alekseev created panels on the end wall and above the passageways in the style of Florentine mosaic which depict Marxist themes. The chandeliers were made of optical glass which had to be reduced in thickness because of the weight of the spiral fixtures.

1979, Perovo station, like the Marxist station, teamed Aleshina and Volovich, with participation by Samoilova and Tkachev. The station was poured concrete with a shallow vaulted ceiling, featuring arts and crafts as a theme. On the walls, white marble slabs alternated with carved stone compositions, united by floral motifs, adorning the walls. The carved stones feature mythological creatures including a gamayun, a phoenix, a winged horse, other birds and both a happy and sad sun. The floors were made of black and brown granite. The lighting was inset into the ceiling in a pointed zig-zag design feature. Along the length, the middle of the station featured five marble clustered pillars surrounded by bench seating. In 1980, the design was awarded a certificate from the Union of Architects.

=== 1980s and 1990s projects ===
1983, Serpukhovskaya station was a collaboration by Aleshina with Leonid N. Pavlov and Lydia Y. Gonchar (Russian: Лидия Юрьевна Гончар). The columns of the central hall were faced with Gazgan marble in warm tones and had metallic accents. The hall was tubular in shape and was the first of the Metro stations to use fiber optic lighting on a message board. The platform lighting was traditional fluorescent bulbs. Walls on the track were faced with white marble. The station was decorated in themes based on ancient cities near Moscow by the painter Lyubov A. Novikova (Russian: Л. A. Новиковa) and the sculptor T. B. Taborovskaya.

1983, Chertanovskaya station was a solo shallow column project designed by Aleshina. It was constructed of precast, reinforced concrete for which Aleshina personally oversaw the concrete and finishing work. The 26 star-shaped columns on each side of the central hallway were joined by arches. Pyramid-shaped crystal chandeliers provided the lighting. Both the columns and track walls were faced with white marble. Walls featured metal inlays designed by Alekseev and Novikova, who also created mosaics on the southern entrance lobby based on the theme "Constructing a new Moscow". The floor was paved with a geometric pattern of red and black granite.

1985, Domodedovskaya station was another collaborative design between Aleshina and Samoilova, with the artist Mikhail Alekseev. The theme of the station was aviation and it was built on the standard plan of two tracks flanking a column-lined central hallway. Columns and walls were faced with white and gray grained marble and copper insets depicting aircraft adorned the walls. The floor featured a geometric pattern of alternating gray and black granite. The lighting mimicked that found in the passenger cabin of an airplane.

1988, Mendeleyevskaya station was a joint design project of Aleshina and Samoilova using columns connected by arches to form an arcade in a traditional Russian style. Columns were faced in white marble and the walls along the track were made of grey marble with reddish veining. The theme of the station was Dmitri Mendeleev's scientific works and at one end of the central hall was a portrait of Mendeleev and his periodic table. Inserted into the walls were decorations created by L. Kremnevoy (Russian: Л.Кремневой) of stylized depictions of atoms and molecular structures. The lighting utilized balls of varying sizes fixed inside a structure resembling a molecular lattice. The floor was paved with gray granite.

1990, Podbelskogo Street station returned to the team of Aleshina, Samoilova and Alekseev. The station was named after Vadim Podbelsky, a twentieth century statesman and party leader and featured a sculpted bust of Podbelsky created by Alekseev. A standard reinforced concrete project, the design had two rows of 26 columns faced with white marble. Affixed to the walls were striped metal panels and the floor was gray granite with narrow strips of red and black detailing. In 2014, the station was renamed to the Bulvar Rokossovskogo station, as the street on which its primary entrance was located had been renamed in 1994.

1995, Chkalovskaya station was a collaborative effort between Aleshina, Leonid L. Borzenkov (Russian: Л. Л. Борзенков), and Aleksandr L. Vigdorov with assistance by T. V. Chistyakova (Russian: Т. В. Чистякова). The station was dedicated to the pilot Valery Chkalov and based on an aviation theme. The lobby featured stylized welded metal elements resembling aircraft. The ceiling arches and pylon designs were created to resemble the shape of an airplane wing and fuselage. Station columns were made of a blue-gray veined marble reminiscent of the sky with decorative shiny metallic elements. At the ends of the hall ceramic panels designed by Mikhail Alekseev and L. A. Novikova depicted clouds swirling around the globe. The walls of the tracks were faced with light colored marble at the top and a dark marble at the bottom, while the floor was paved with black and gray granite.

== See also ==
Zarema Nagayeva

== Photo gallery ==
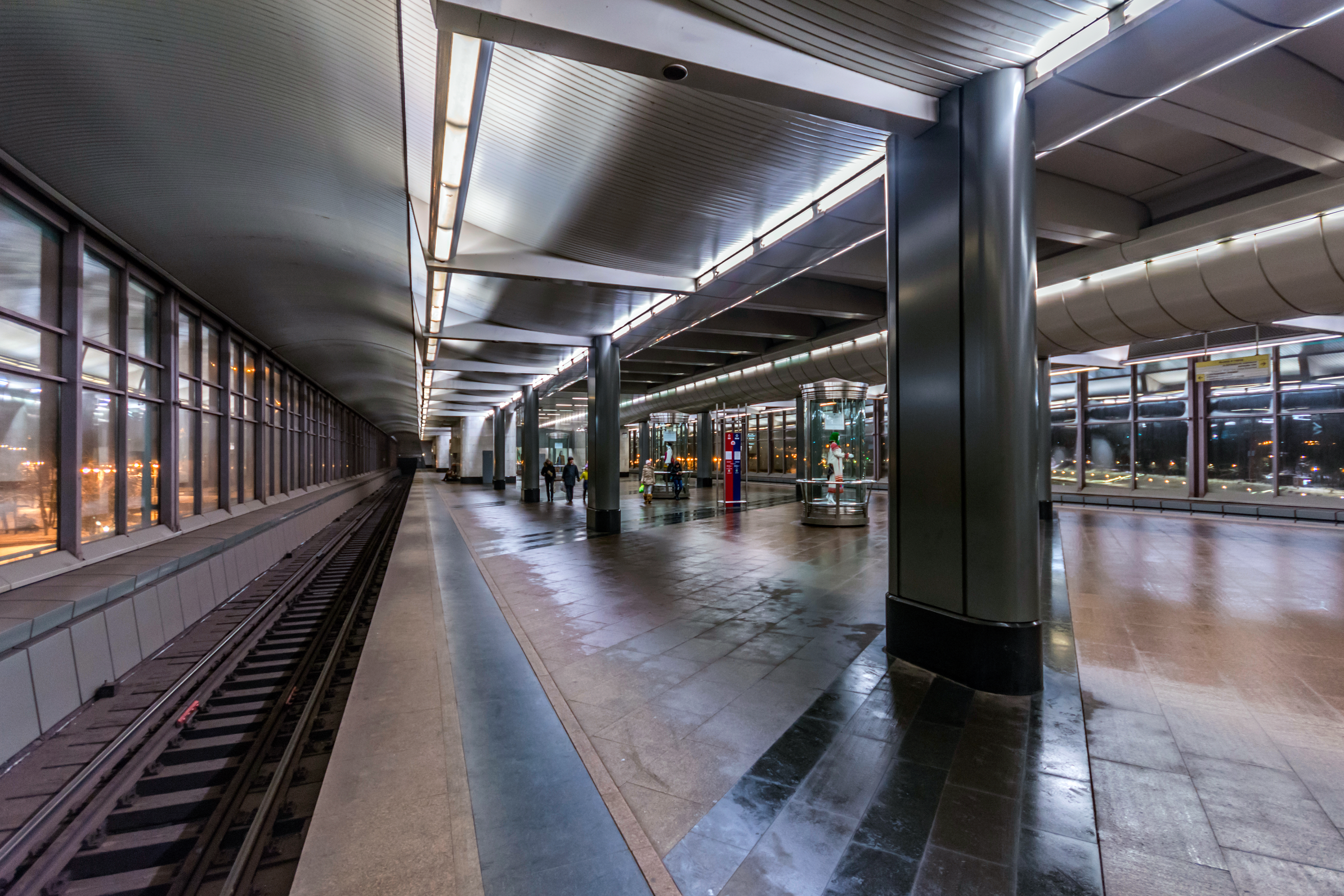
Vorobyovy Gory station

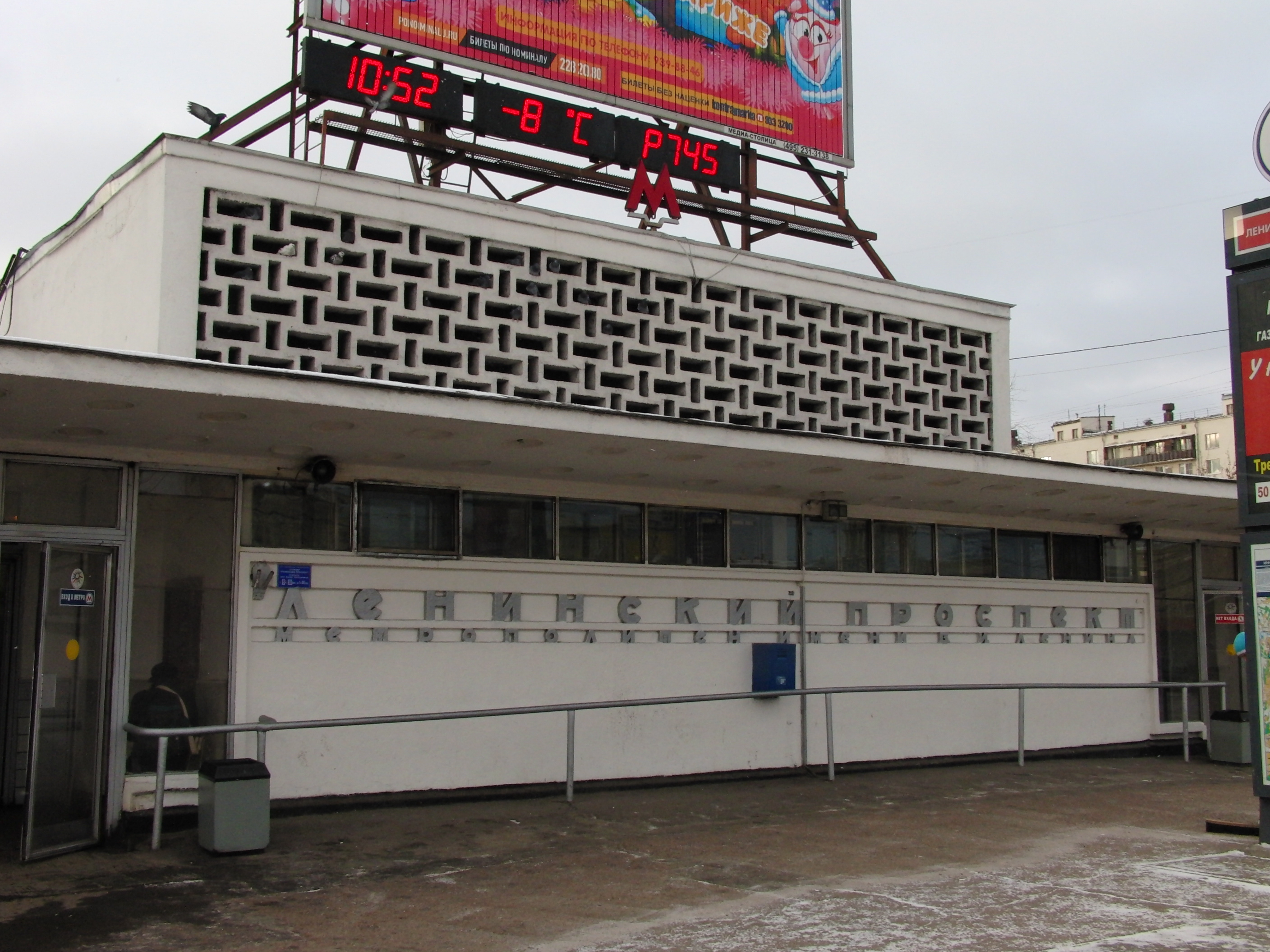
Leninsky Prospekt station

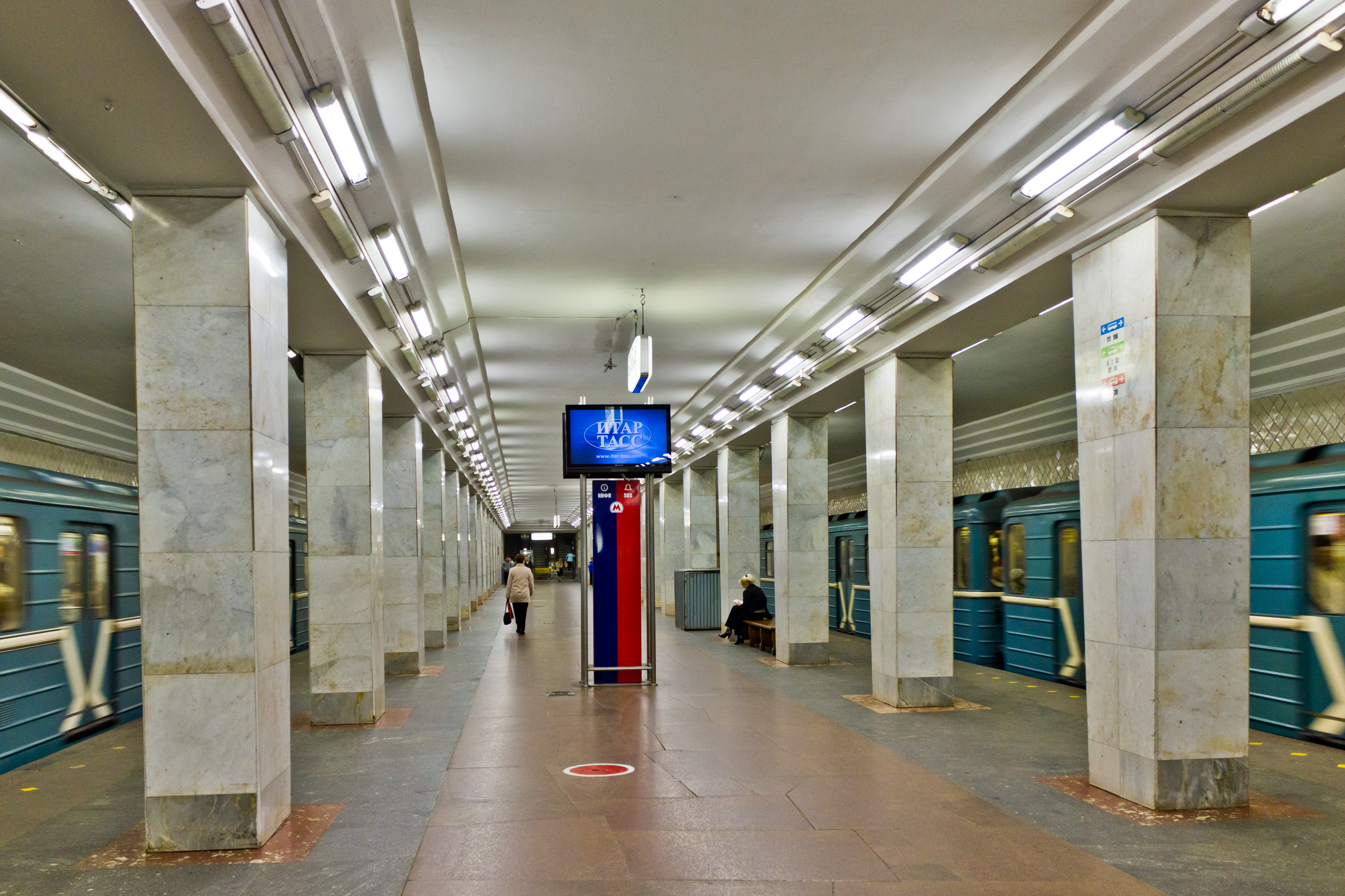
Leninsky Prospekt platform

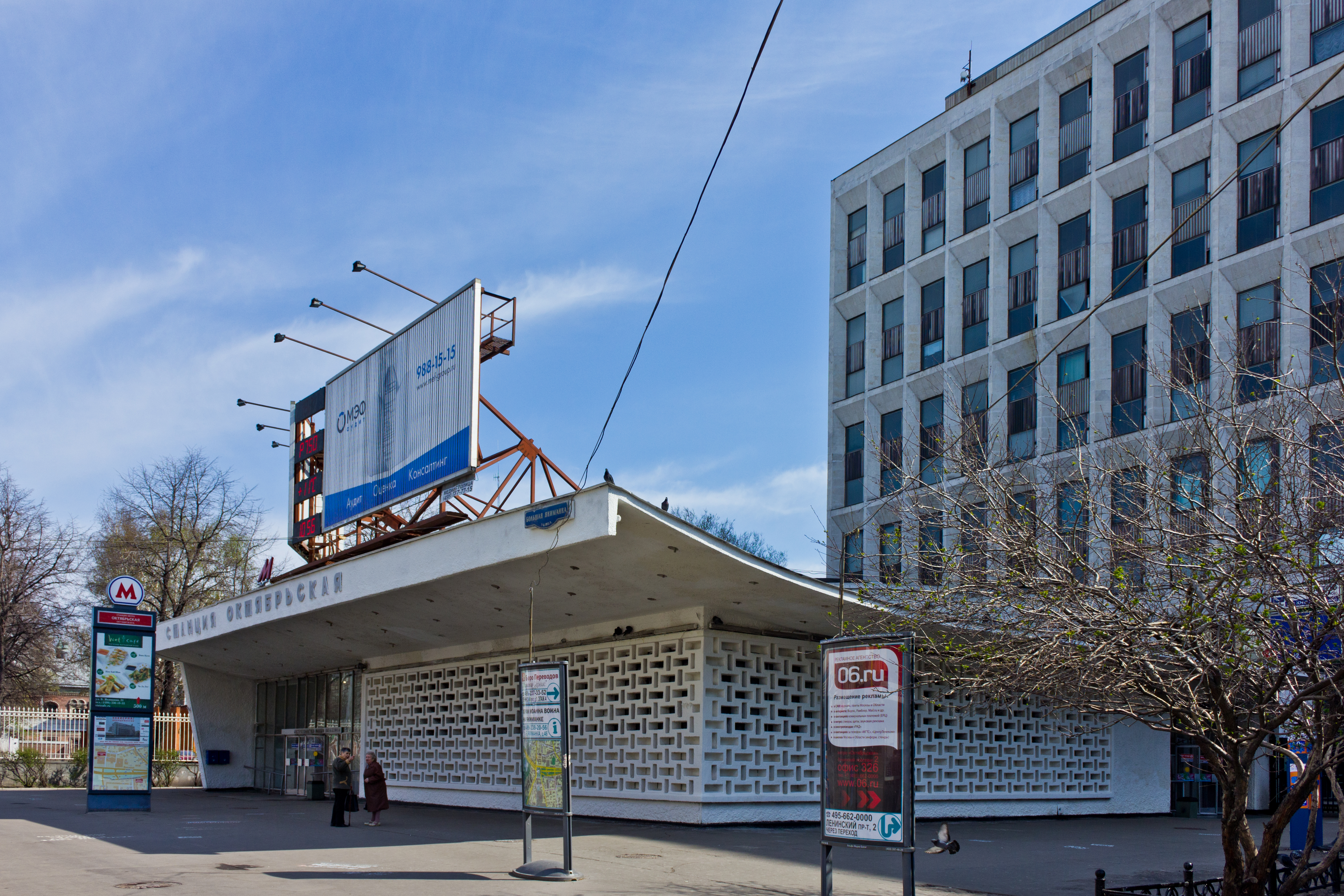
Oktyabrskaya station

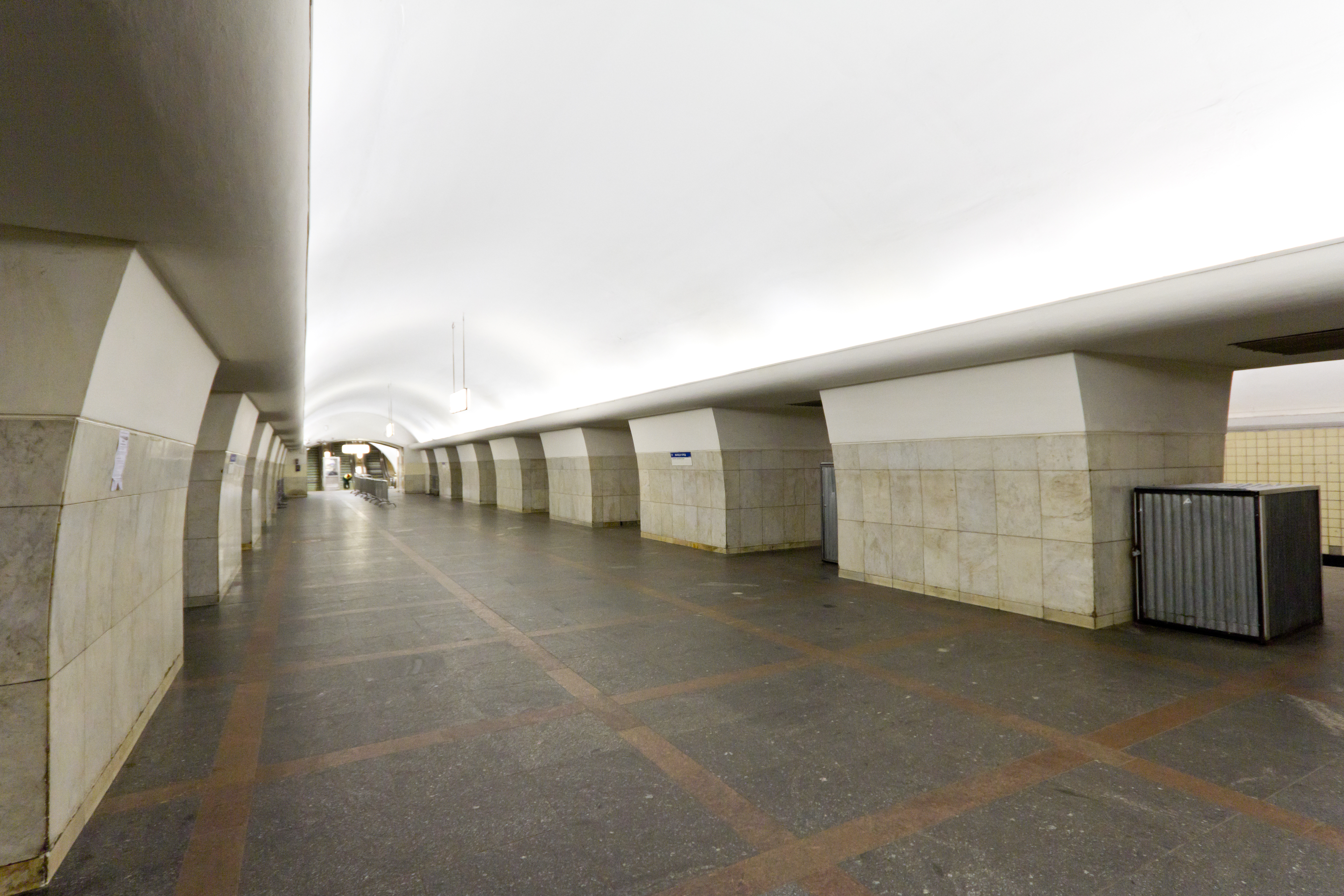
Oktyabrskaya platform

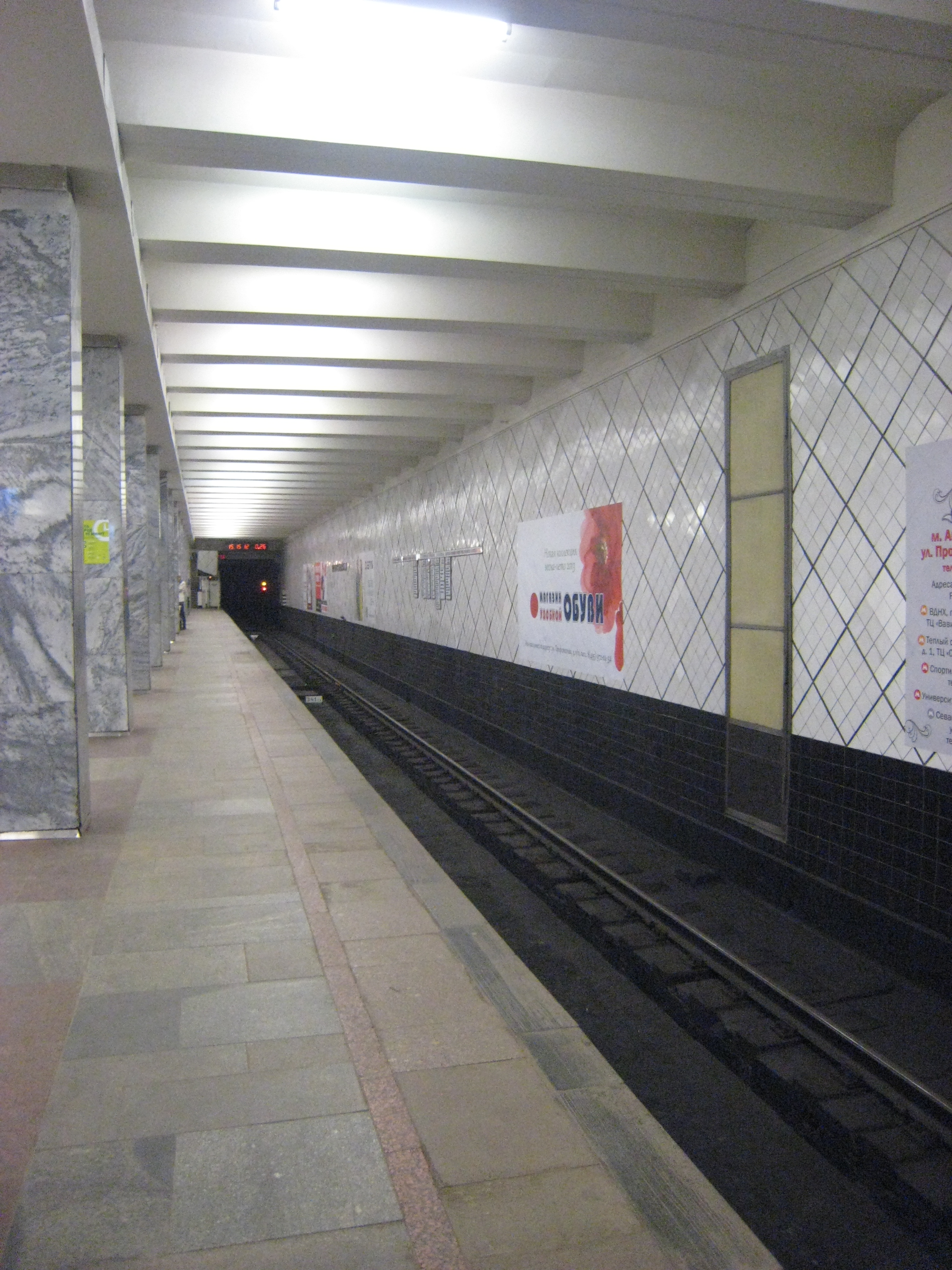
Profsoyuznaya station

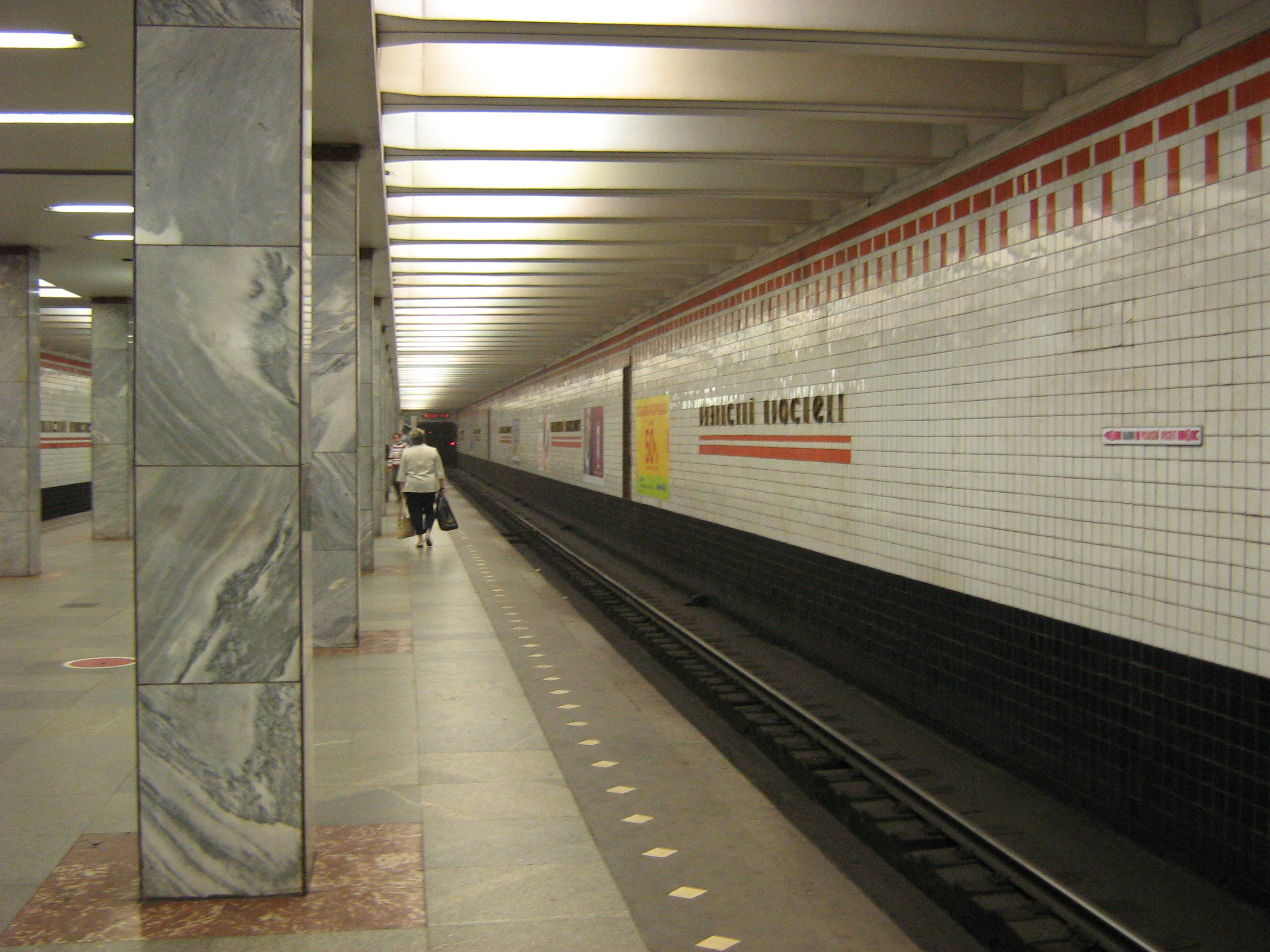
Ryazansky Prospekt station

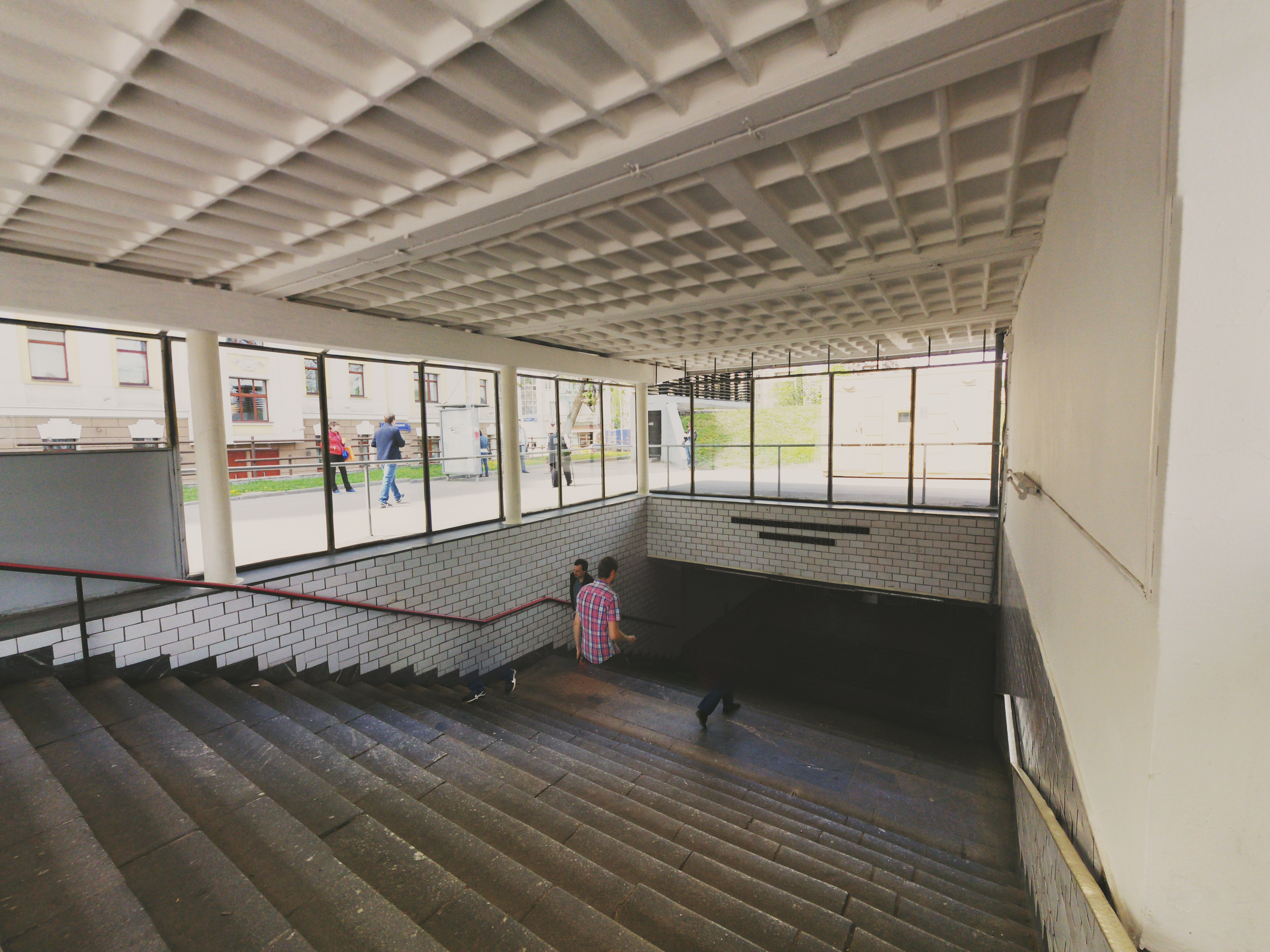
Taganskaya station entrance

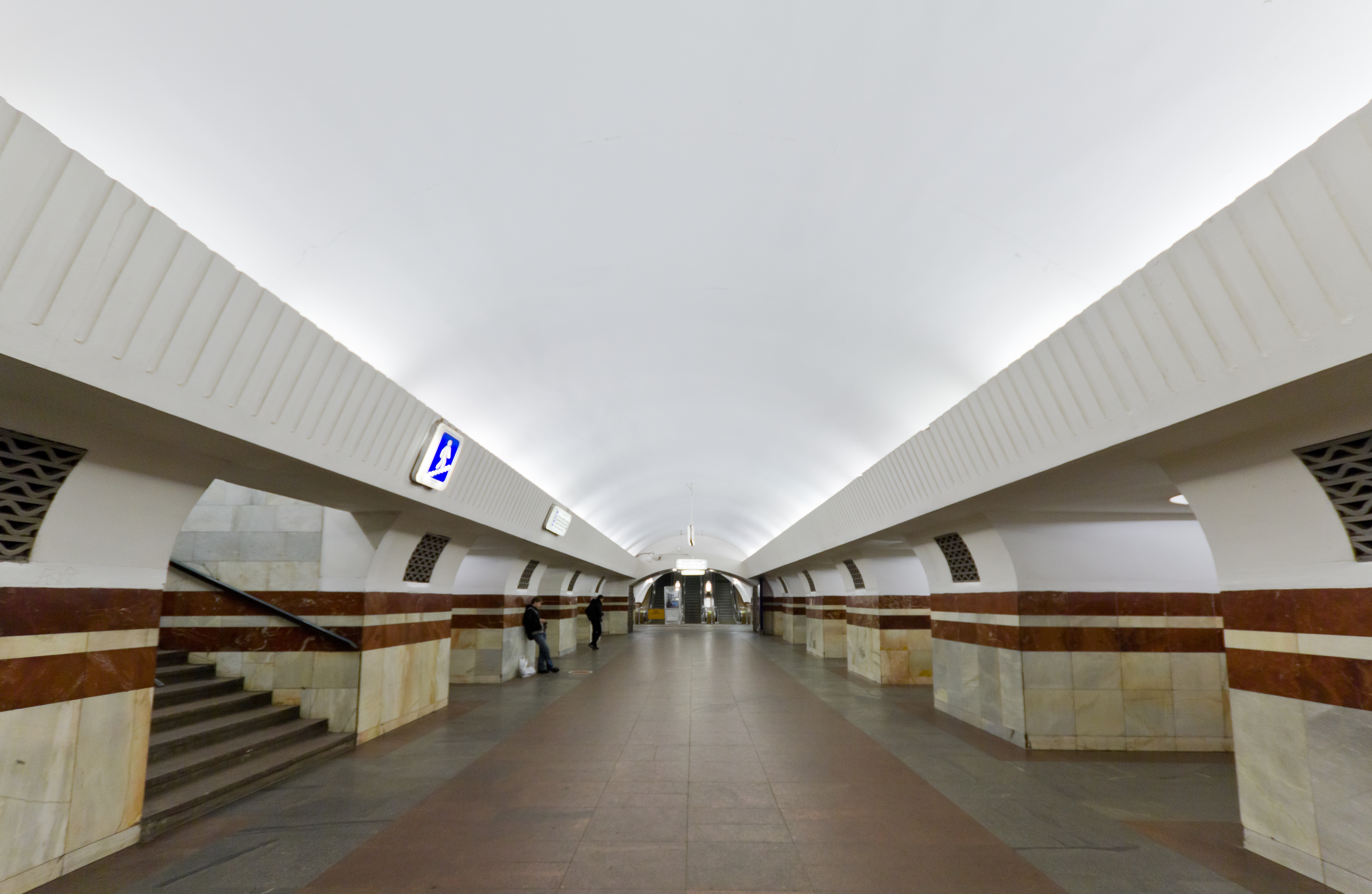
Taganskaya station

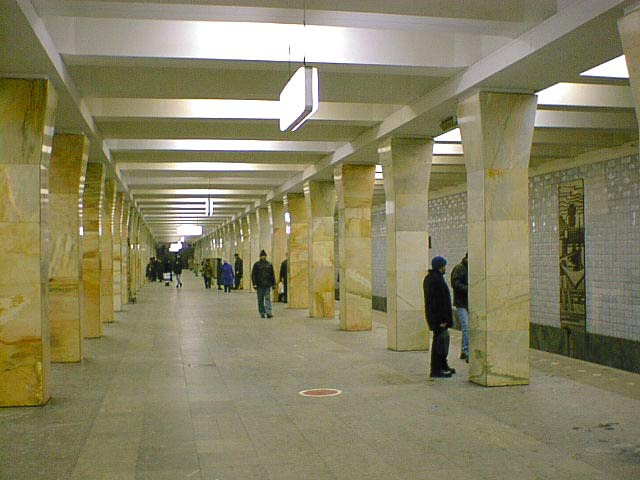
Varshavskaya station

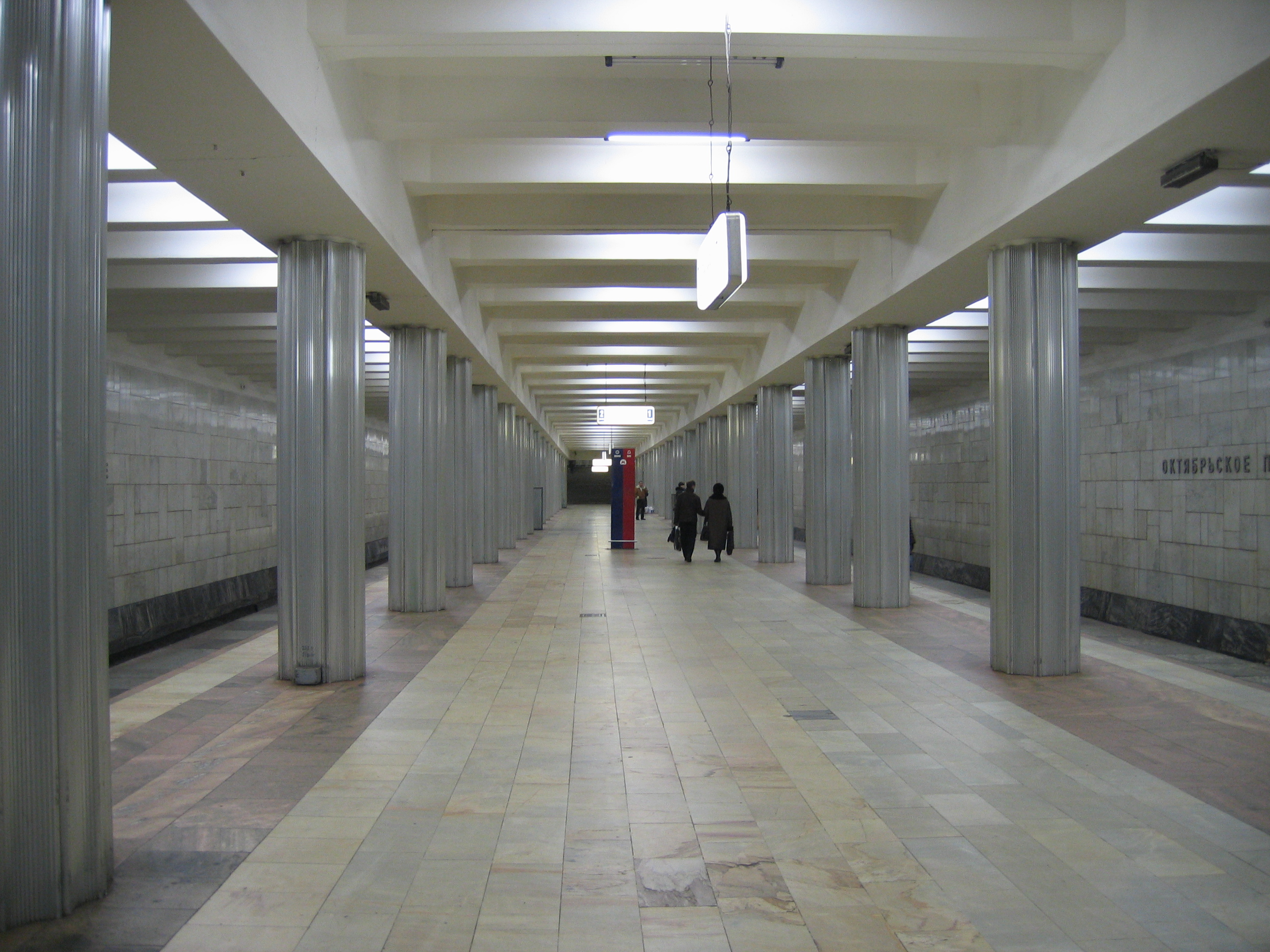
Oktyabrskoye Pole station

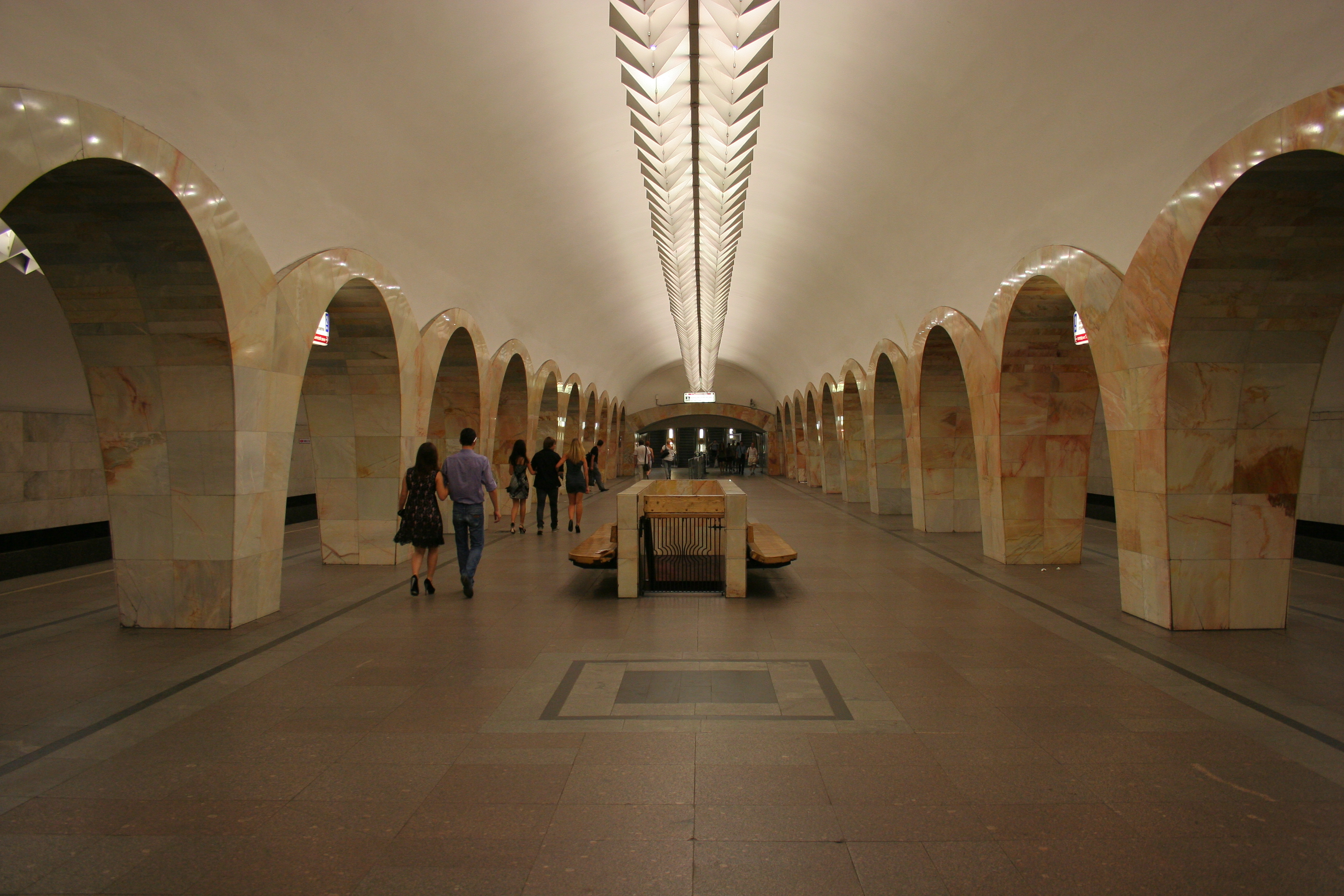
Kuznetsky Most station

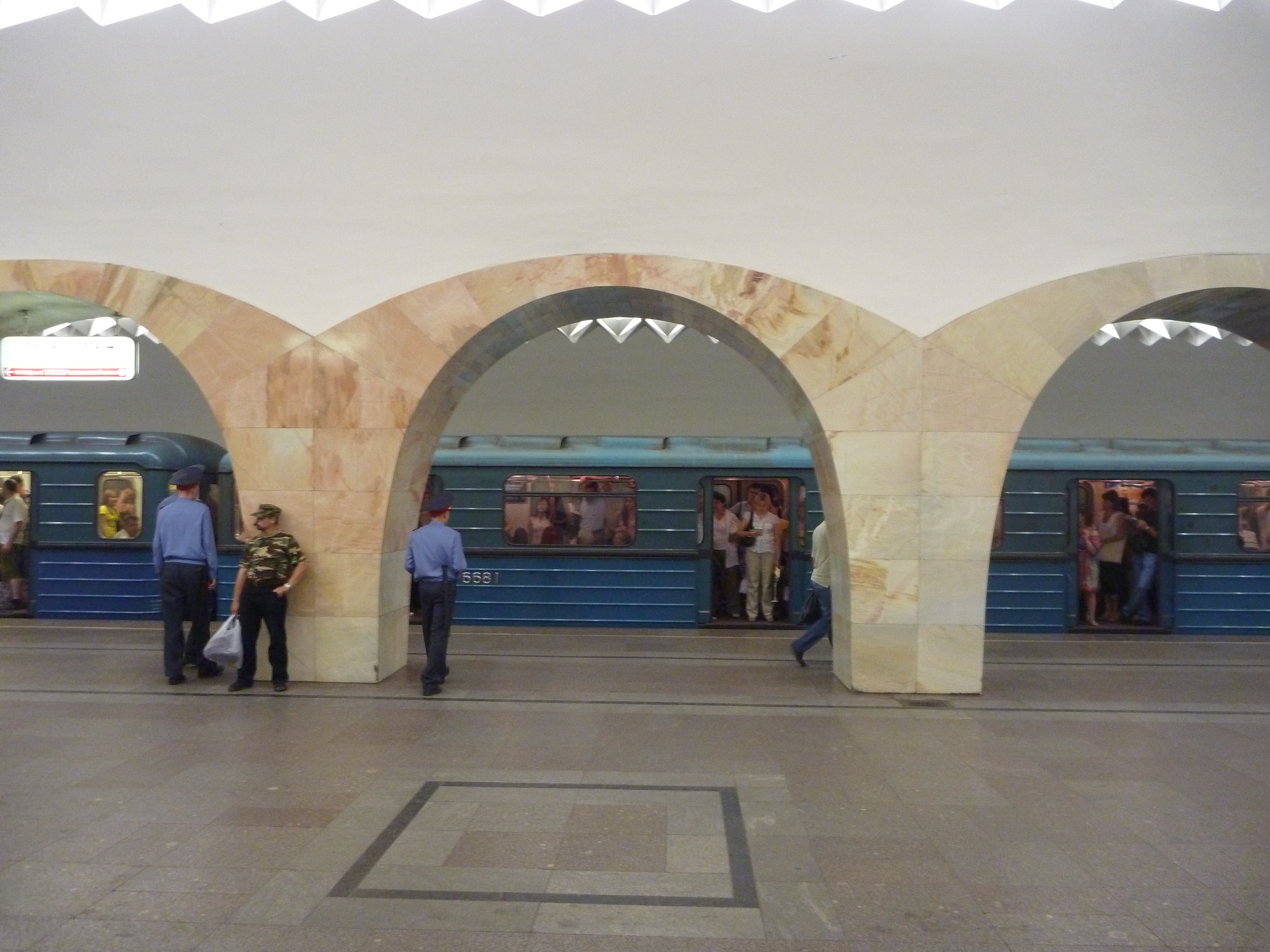
Kuznetsky Most station columns

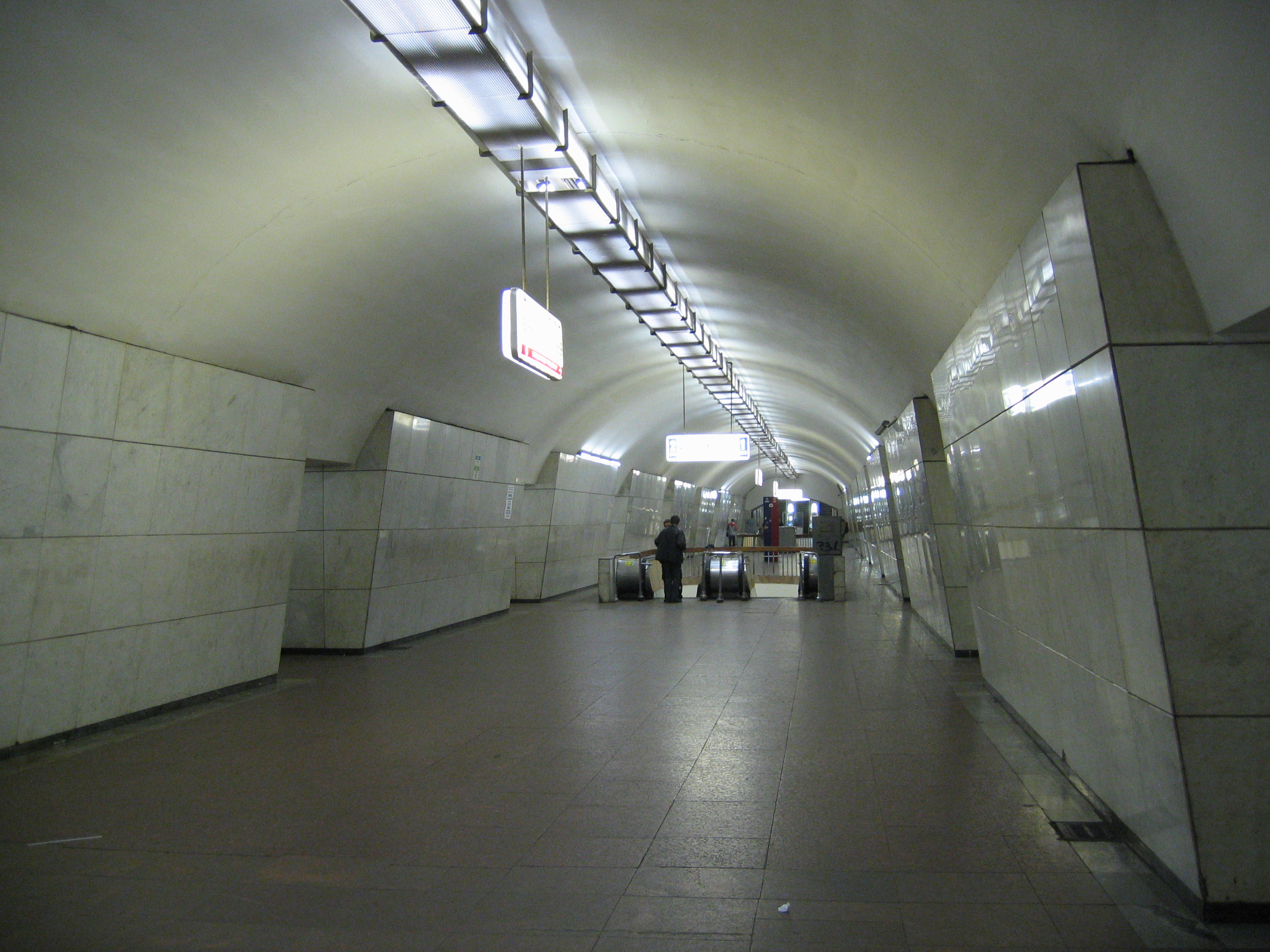
Lubyanka station

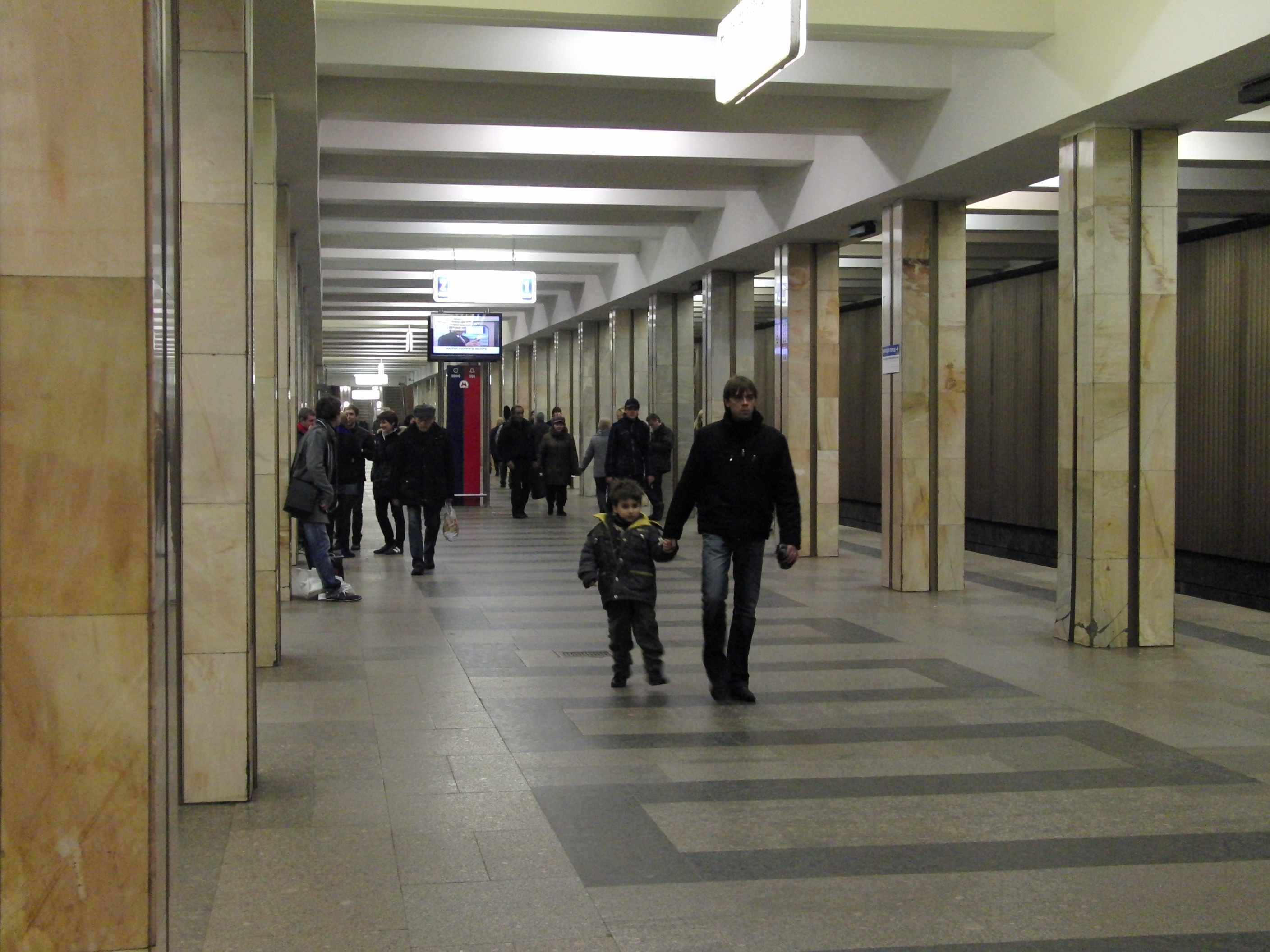
Shchukinskaya station

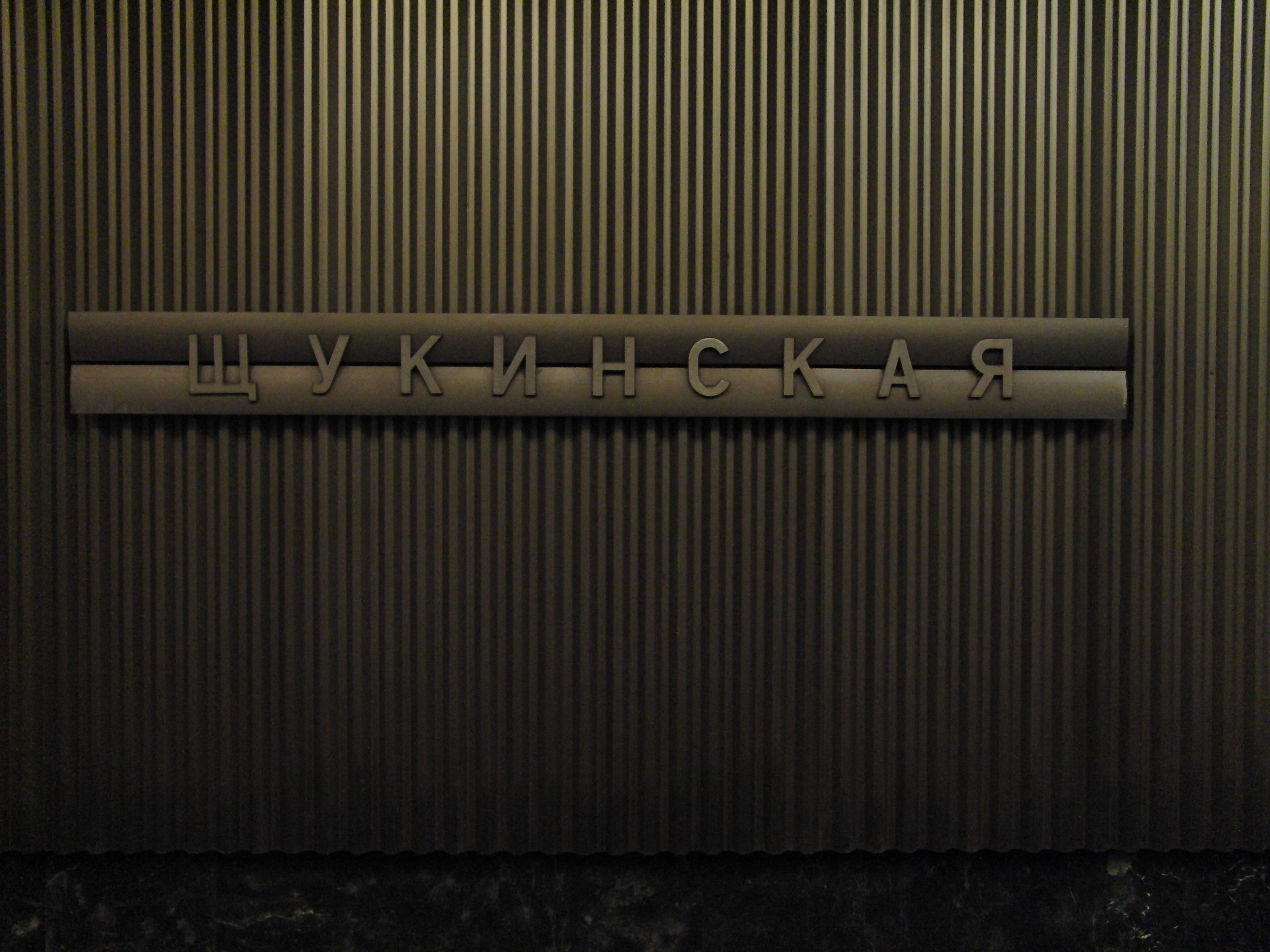
Shchukinskaya platform

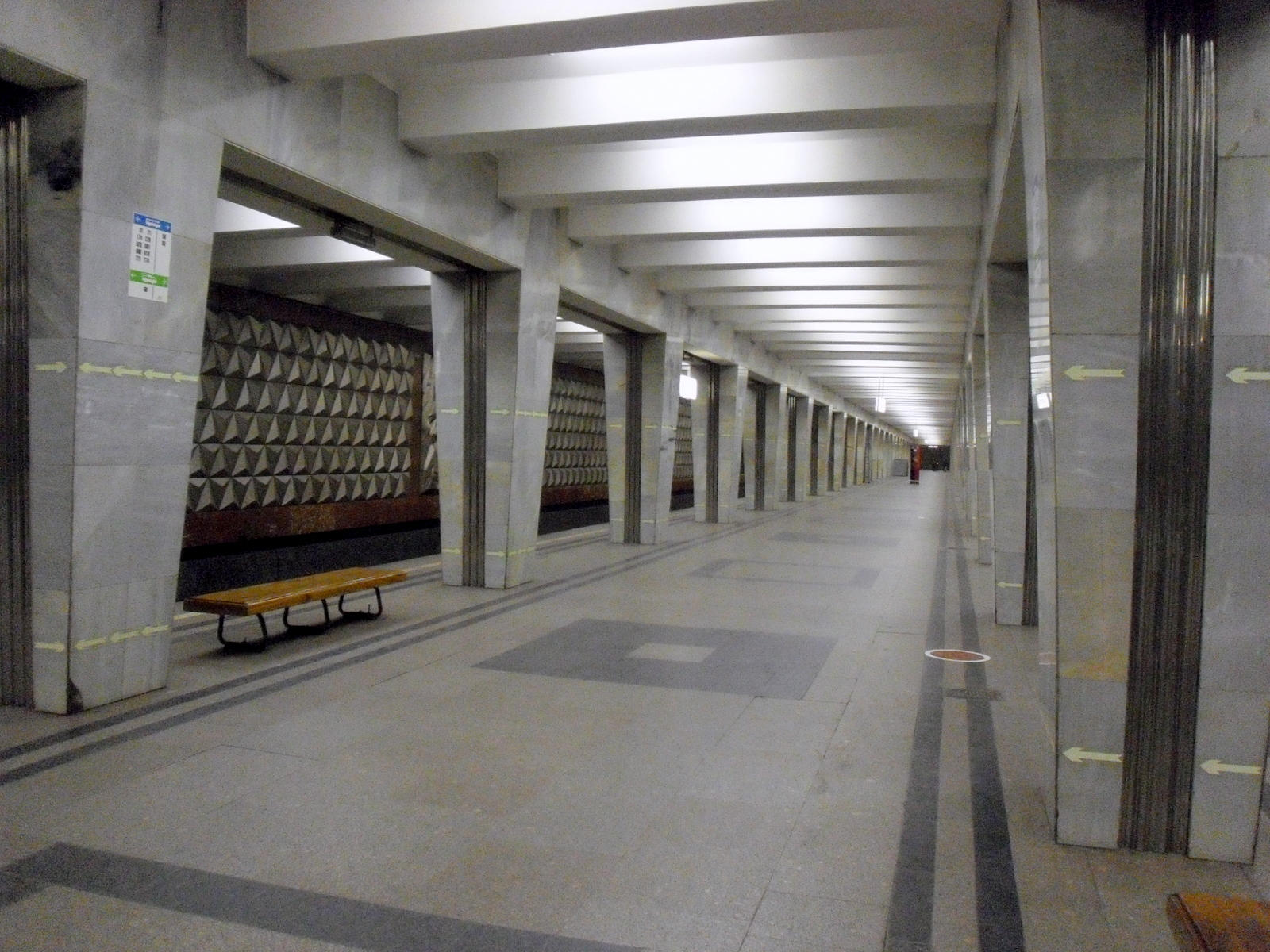
Medvedkovo station

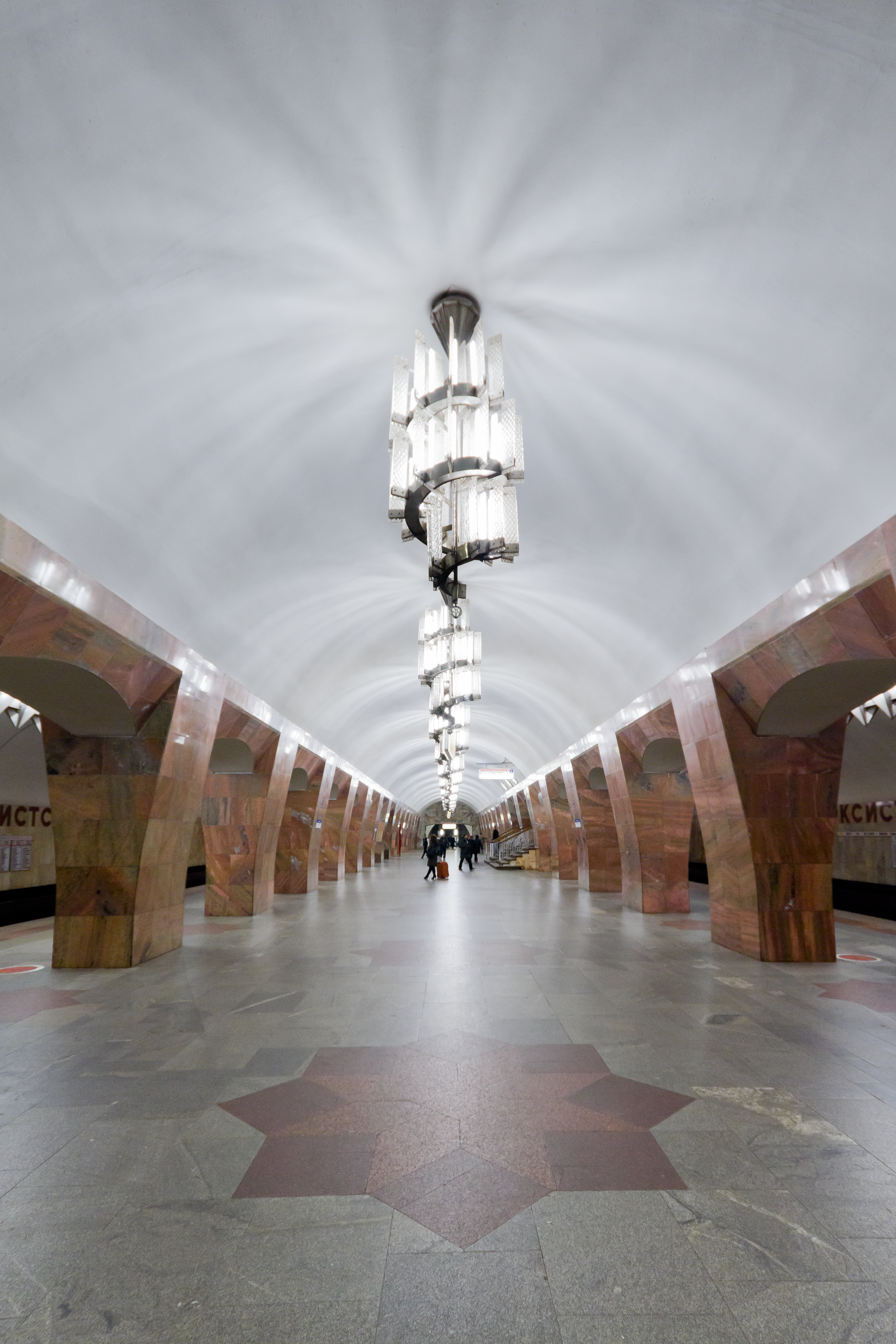
Marksistskaya station

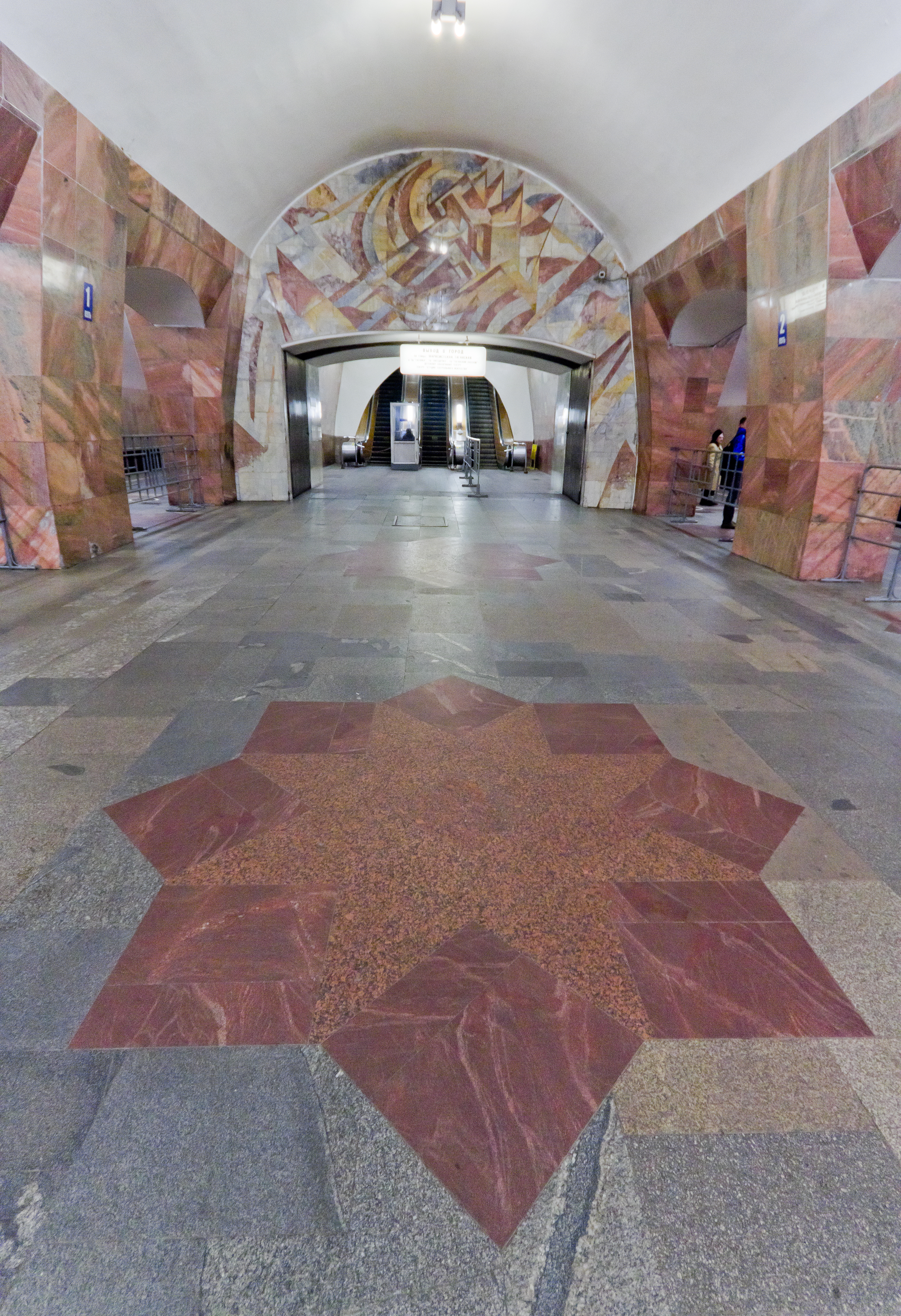
Marksistskaya station

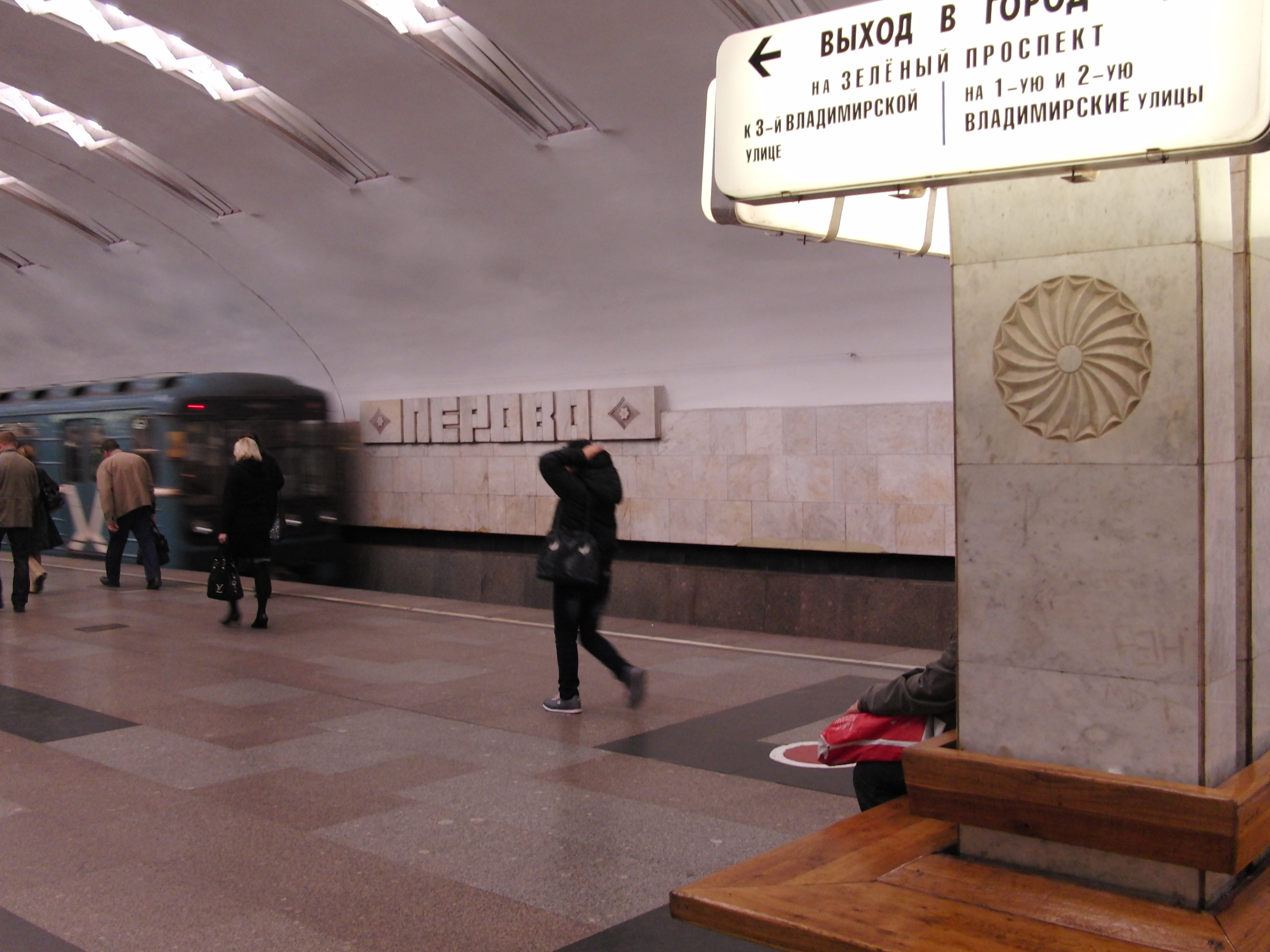
Perovo station

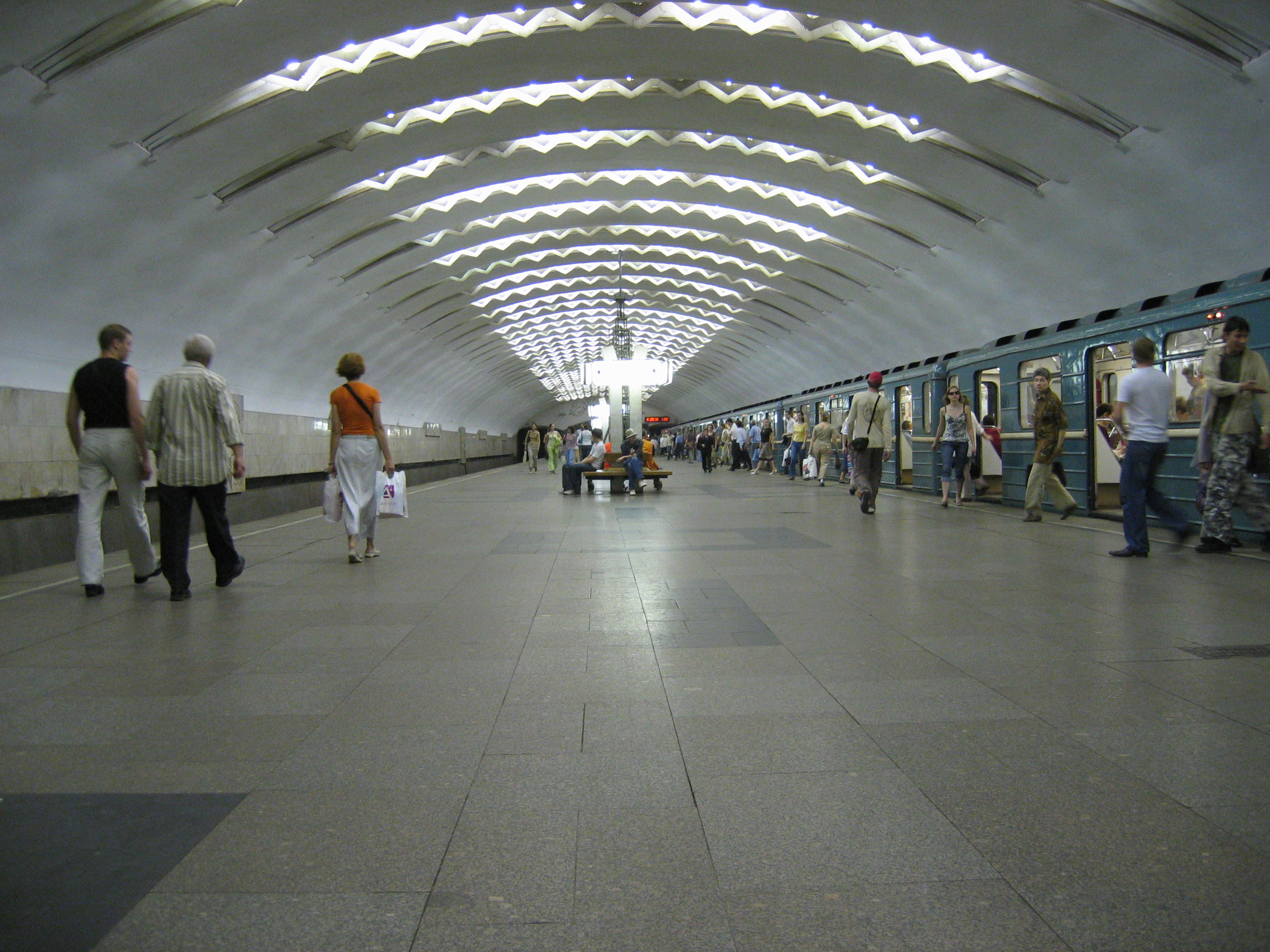
Perovo station

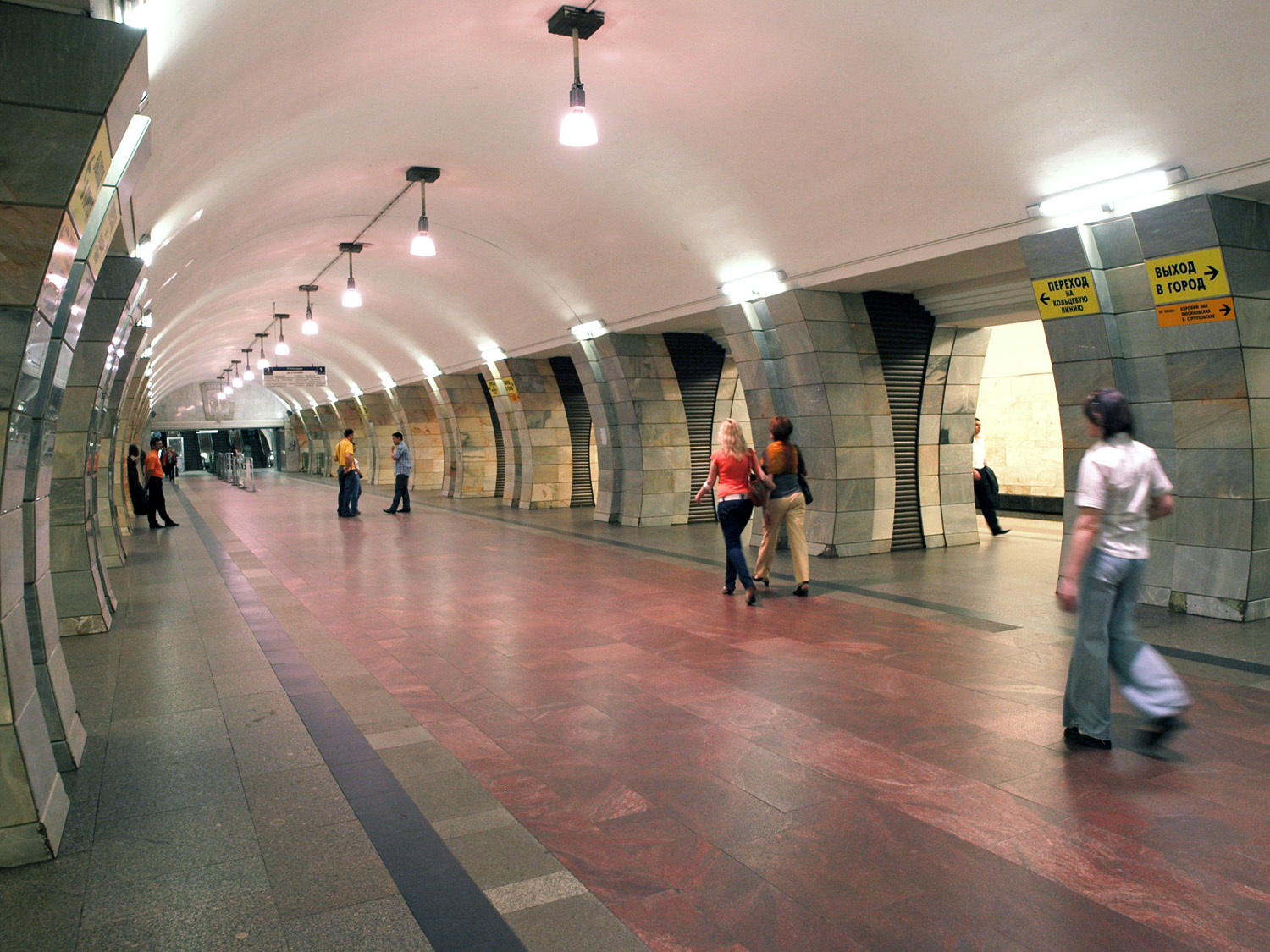
Serpukhovskaya station

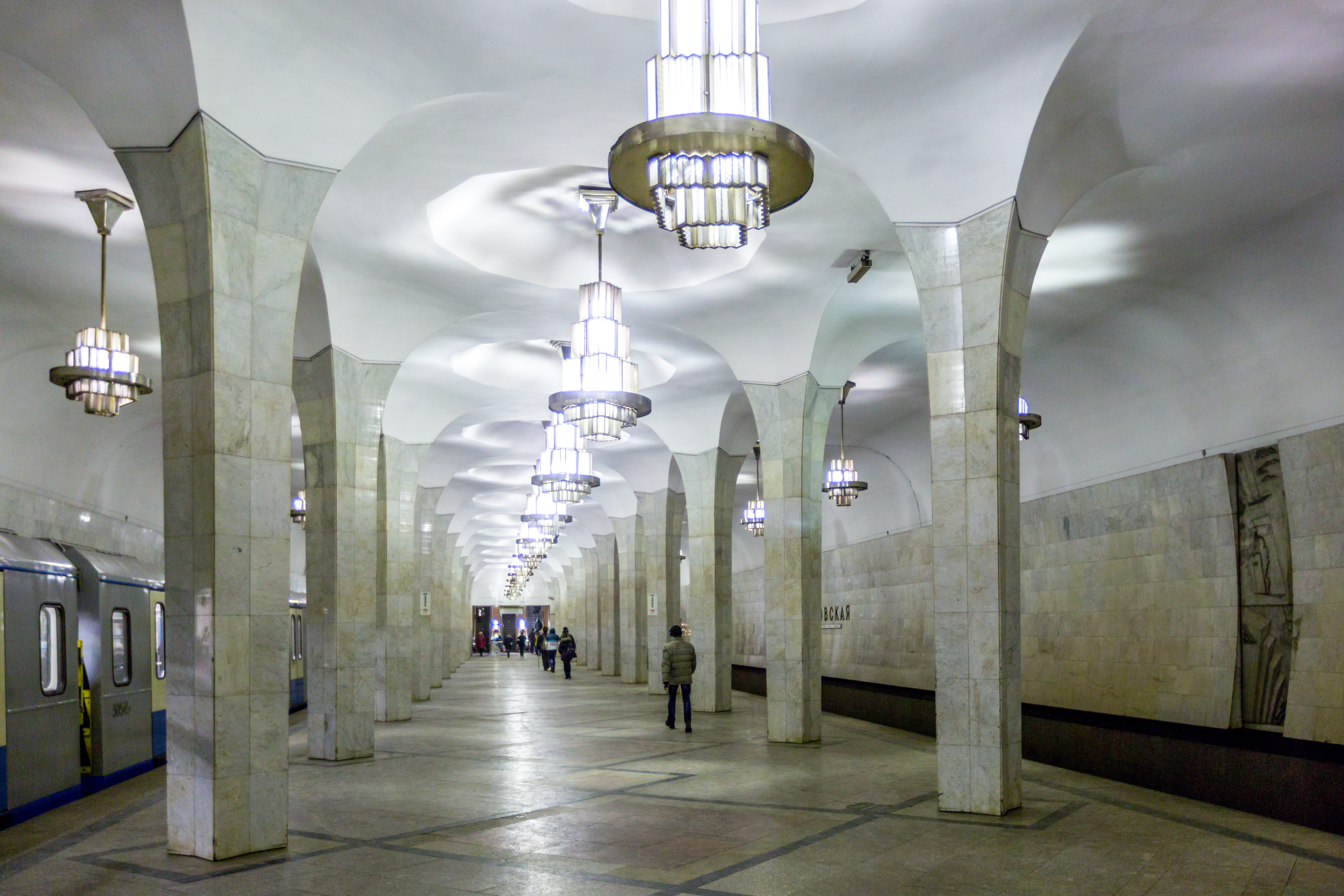
Chertanovskaya station

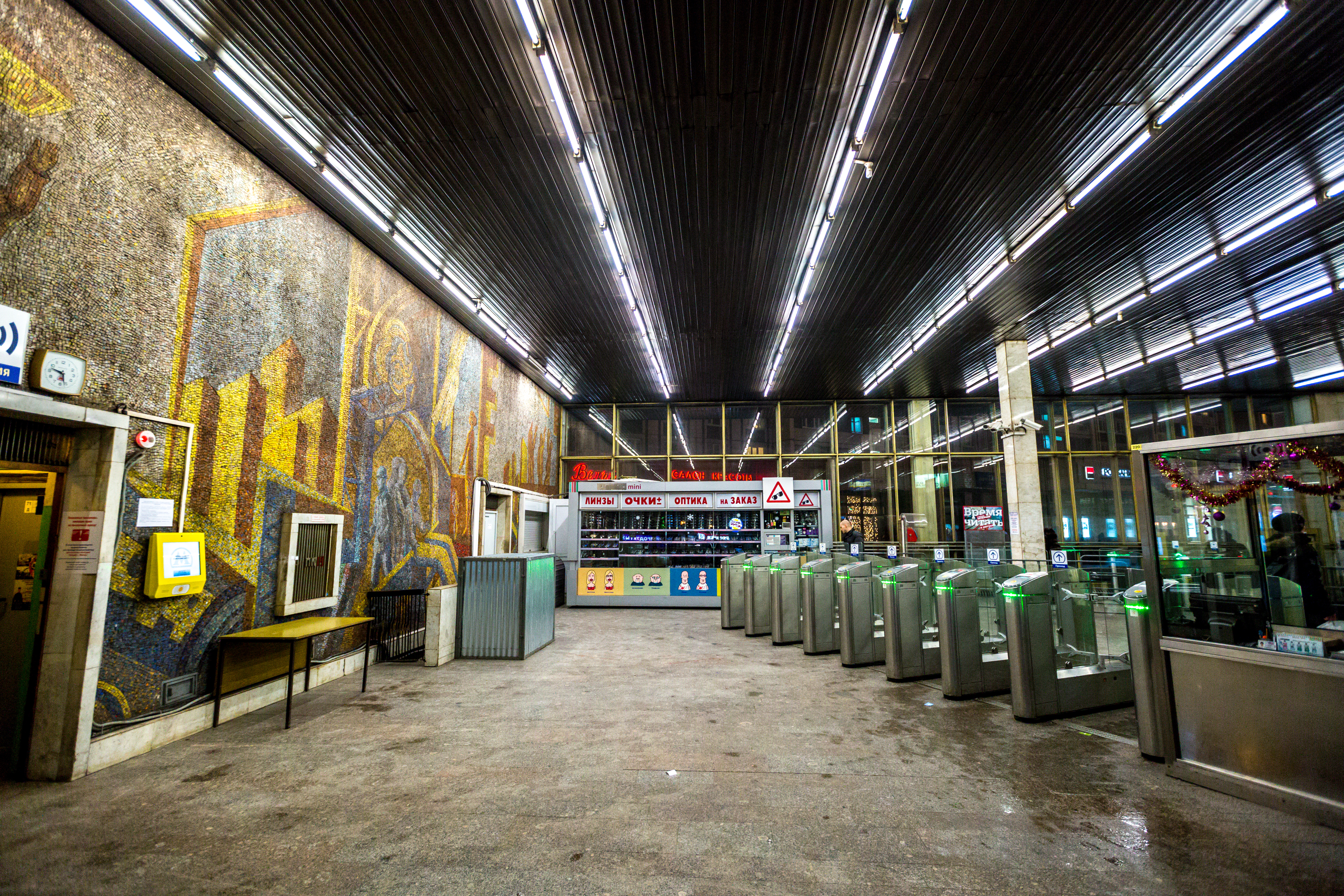
Chertanovskaya station lobby

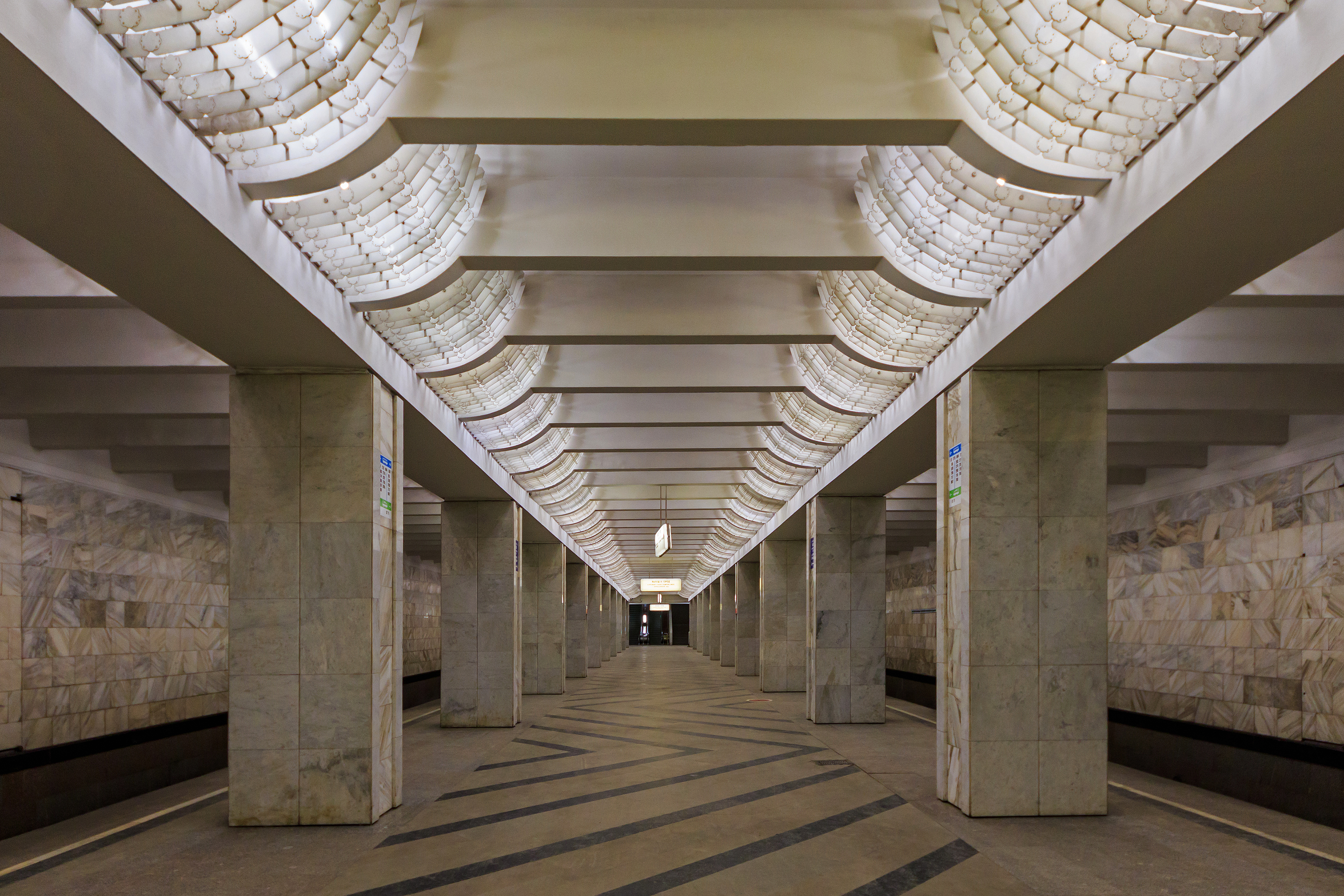
Domodedovskaya station

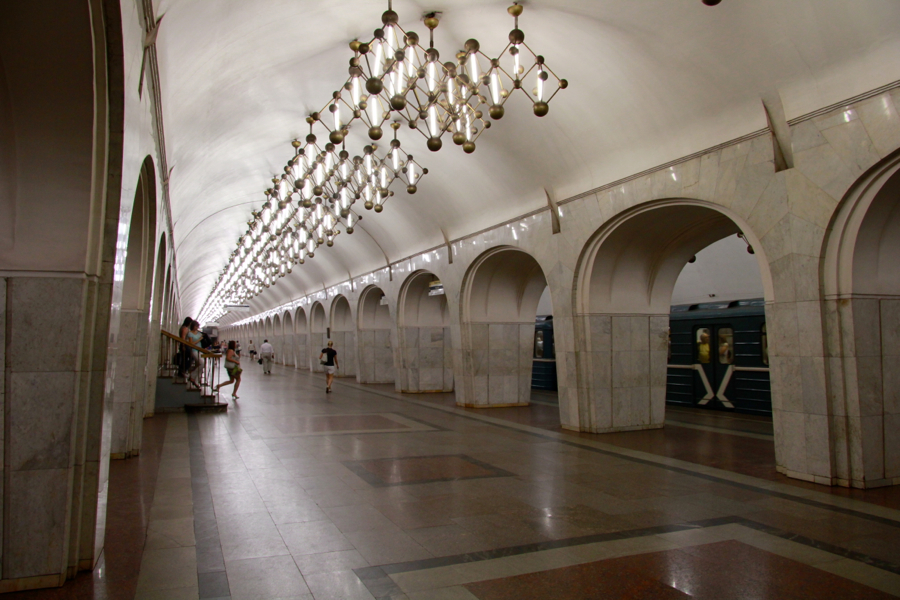
Mendeleyevskaya station

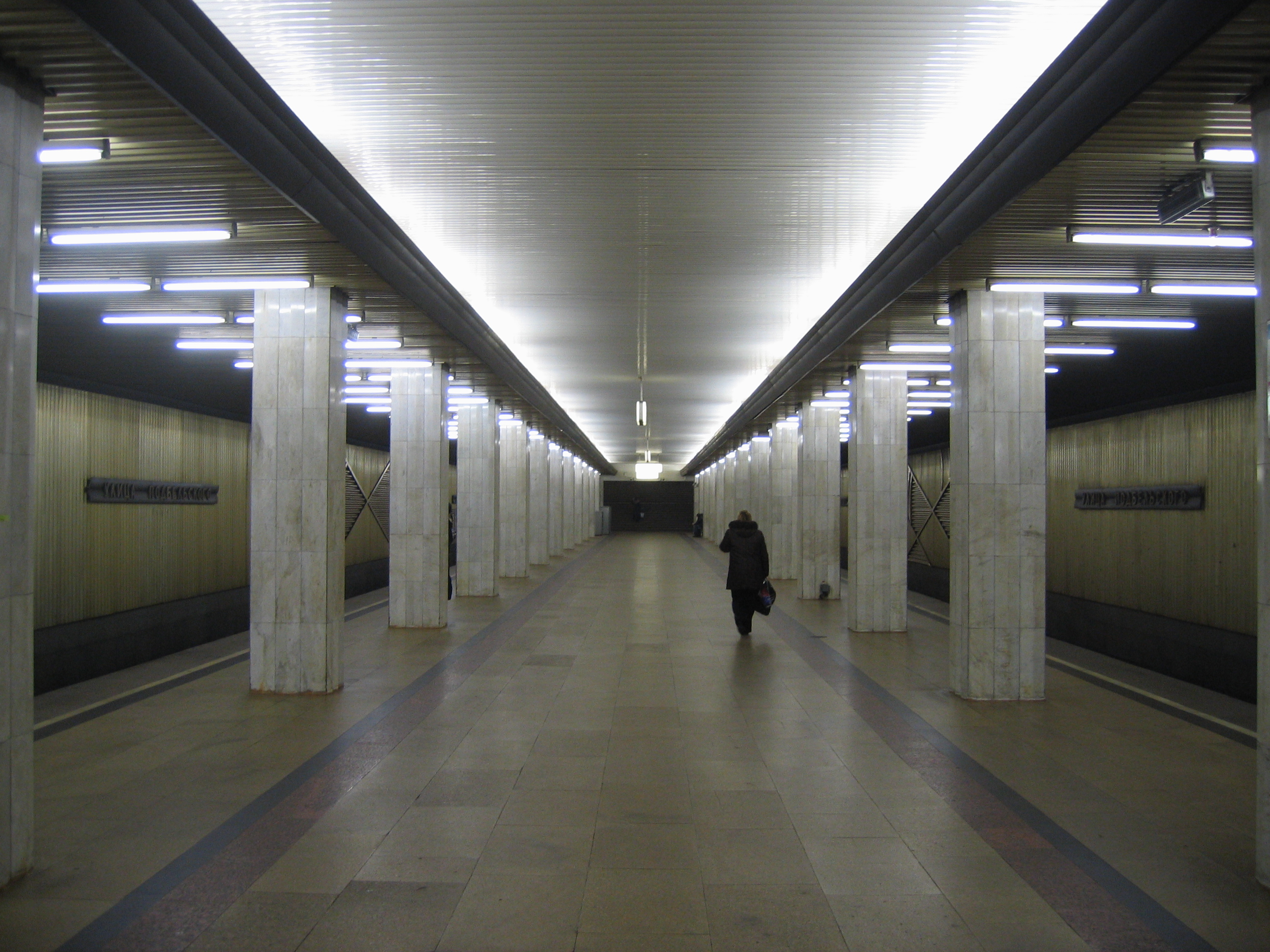
Bulvar Rokossovskogo station

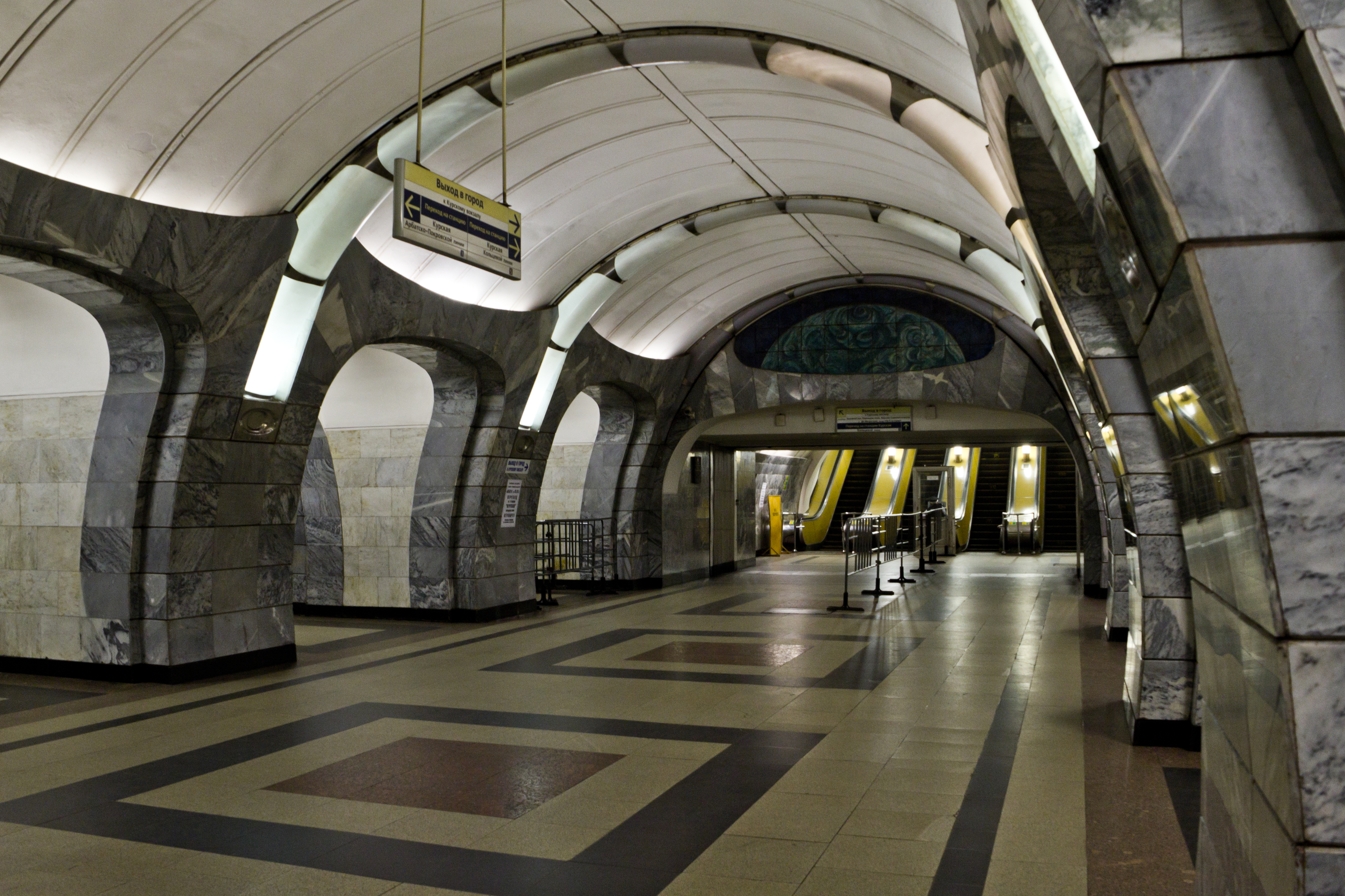
Chkalovskaya station

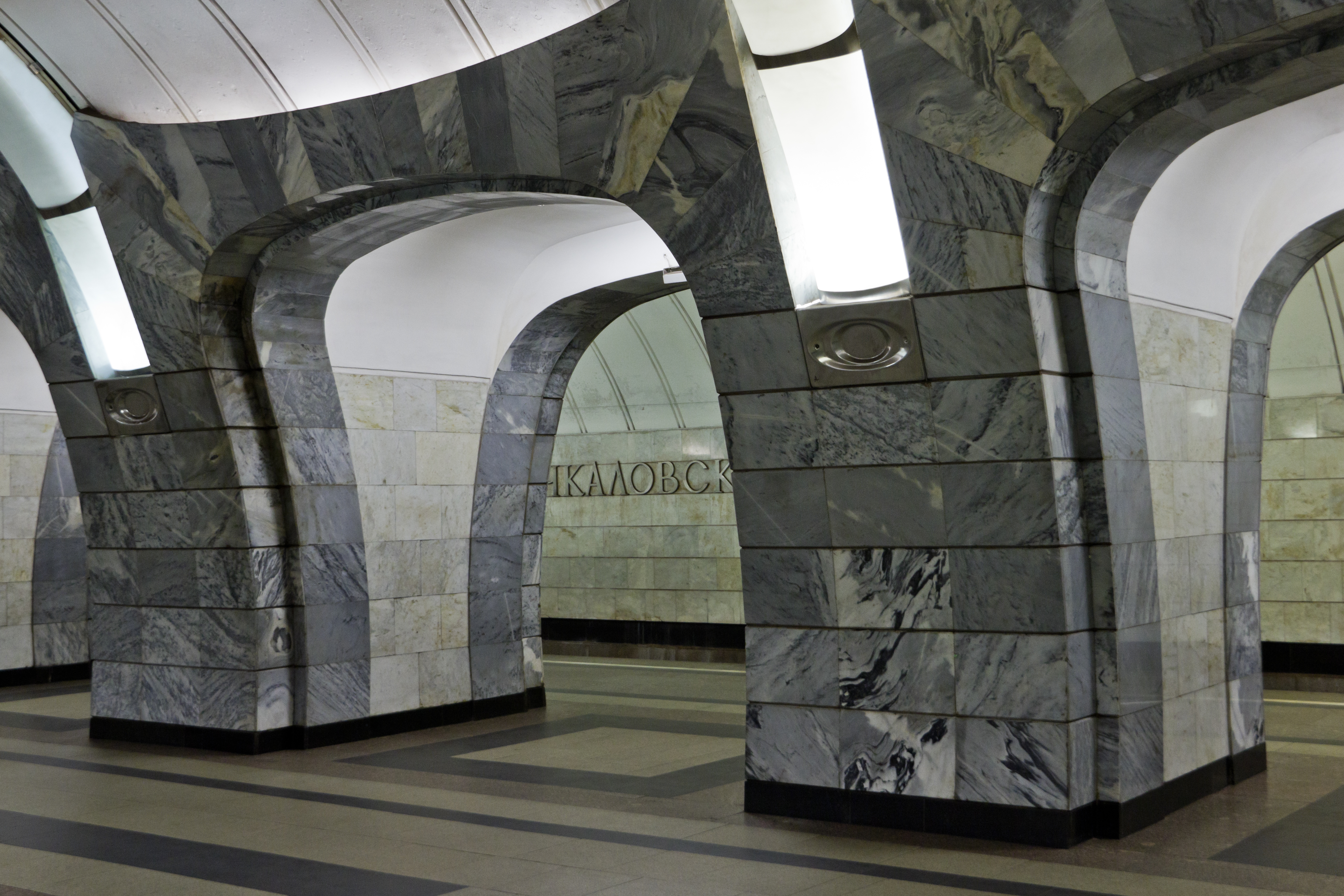
Chkalovskaya station column detail
