= Dezg-e Bala =

Village in Zirkuh Rural District

Dezg-e Bala دزگ بالا
- Village
- Location within Iran
- Coordinates: 33°20′26″N 60°05′49″E
- Country: Iran
- Province: South Khorasan
- County: Zirkuh
- Bakhsh: Central District
- Rural District: Zirkuh

Population (2006)
  - Total: 104
- Time zone: UTC+3:30 (IRST)
  - Summer (DST): UTC+4:30 (IRDT)

Dezg-e Bala (Persian: دزگ بالا, also Romanized as Dezg-e Bālā; also known as Dezg, Desok, Dezak, Dezq, Dozq, and Qal‘eh Dijag) is a village in Zirkuh Rural District, Central District, Zirkuh County, South Khorasan Province, Iran. At the 2006 census, its population was 104, in 34 families.
