= Darj-e Sofla =

Darj-e Sofla دارج سفلي
- Village
- Location within Iran
- Coordinates: 33°23′36″N 60°11′59″E
- Country: Iran
- Province: South Khorasan
- County: Zirkuh
- Bakhsh: Central District
- Rural District: Zirkuh

Population (2006)
  - Total: 105
- Time zone: UTC+3:30 (IRST)
  - Summer (DST): UTC+4:30 (IRDT)

Darj-e Sofla (Persian: دارج سفلي, also Romanized as Dārj-e Soflá and Dāraj-e Soflá; also known as Dārīj-e Pā’īn, Dāraj-e Pā’īn, Dārj Pā’īn, and Qal‘eh Dārīj Pāīn) is a village in Zirkuh Rural District, Central District, Zirkuh County, South Khorasan Province, Iran. At the 2006 census, its population was 105, in 25 families.
