= Petregan playa =

Coordinates: 33.45°N 60.6167°E

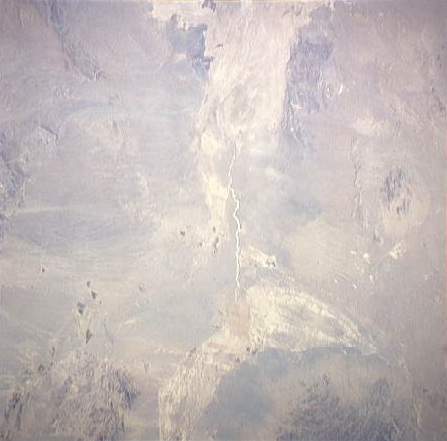
Namakzar (north) and Petergan (south) salt lakes on Iranian-Afghan border

Petregan playa (in Persian: دق پترگان) is a playa (دق dagh in Persian) in eastern Iran next to the border with Afghanistan.

It is located in the Zirkuh County in South Khorasan Province, 610 m above sea level and most of its area lies within Iranian territory.

Footprints of pre-historical animals have been found in this playa. Research by Iranian scholars on 40 footprints shows that these animals moved in groups from east to west and the area at that time was a muddy marshland.

== Sources ==
irandeserts.com, accessed Febr. 2009. (in Persian)
