= Hajjiabad, South Khorasan =

City in South Khorasan province, Iran

Hajjiabad Persian: حاجی‌آباد
- City
- Location within Iran
- Coordinates: 33°36′10″N 59°59′49″E
- Country: Iran
- Province: South Khorasan
- County: Zirkuh
- District: Central

Population (2016)
  - Total: 6,168
- Time zone: UTC+3:30 (IRST)

Hajjiabad (Persian: حاجي آباد) (Note: Also romanized as Ḩājīābād and Hājjīābād; also known as Hajābād) is a city in the Central District of Zirkuh County, South Khorasan province, Iran, serving as capital of both the county and the district. It is also the administrative center for Zirkuh Rural District.

== Demographics ==
=== Population ===
At the time of the 2006 National Census, the city's population was 4,333 in 1,026 households, when it was in the former Zirkuh District of Qaen County. The following census in 2011 counted 5,918 people in 1,400 households. The 2016 census measured the population of the city as 6,168 people in 1,464 households, by which time the district had been separated from the county in the establishment of Zirkuh County. The city and the rural district were transferred to the new Central District, with Hajjiabad as the county's capital.
