= Jimabad, Birjand =

Jimabad جيم اباد
- Village
- Location within Iran
- Coordinates: 32°46′57″N 59°18′12″E
- Country: Iran
- Province: South Khorasan
- County: Birjand
- Bakhsh: Central
- Rural District: Baqeran

Population (2006)
  - Total: 27
- Time zone: UTC+3:30 (IRST)
  - Summer (DST): UTC+4:30 (IRDT)

Jimabad (Persian: جيم اباد, also Romanized as Jīmābād; also known as Jumbād) is a village in Baqeran Rural District, in the Central District of Birjand County, South Khorasan Province, Iran. At the 2006 census, its population was 27, in 8 families.
