= Shushk, Khusf =

Shushk شوشك
- Village
- Location within Iran
- Coordinates: 32°42′00″N 59°07′48″E
- Country: Iran
- Province: South Khorasan
- County: Khusf
- Bakhsh: Jolgeh-e Mazhan
- Rural District: Barakuh

Population (2006)
  - Total: 16
- Time zone: UTC+3:30 (IRST)
  - Summer (DST): UTC+4:30 (IRDT)

Shushk (Persian: شوشك, also Romanized as Shūshḵ) is a village in Barakuh Rural District, Jolgeh-e Mazhan District, Khusf County, South Khorasan Province, Iran. At the 2006 census, its population was 16, in 5 families.
