= Kartabad, Lorestan =

Kartabad كرت اباد
- Village
- Location within Iran
- Coordinates: 33°51′24″N 48°43′40″E
- Country: Iran
- Province: Lorestan
- County: Borujerd
- Bakhsh: Central
- Rural District: Hemmatabad

Population (2006)
  - Total: 140
- Time zone: UTC+3:30 (IRST)
  - Summer (DST): UTC+4:30 (IRDT)

Kartabad (Persian: كرت اباد, also Romanized as Kartābād and Kertābād) is a village in Hemmatabad Rural District, in the Central District of Borujerd County, Lorestan Province, Iran. At the 2006 census, its population was 140, in 34 families.
