= Dorraj-e Sofla =

Dorraj-e Sofla دراج سفلي
- Village
- Location within Iran
- Coordinates: 37°11′46″N 46°39′59″E
- Country: Iran
- Province: East Azerbaijan
- County: Maragheh
- Bakhsh: Saraju
- Rural District: Quri Chay-ye Gharbi

Population (2006)
  - Total: 102
- Time zone: UTC+3:30 (IRST)
  - Summer (DST): UTC+4:30 (IRDT)

Dorraj-e Sofla (Persian: دراج سفلي, also Romanized as Dorrāj-e Soflá and Darāj-e Soflá) is a village in Quri Chay-ye Gharbi Rural District, Saraju District, Maragheh County, East Azerbaijan Province, Iran. At the 2006 census, its population was 102, in 22 families.
