= Zirkuh District =

Former district in South Khorasan province, Iran

Zirkuh District Persian: بخش زیرکوه
- Former District
- Location within Iran
- Coordinates: 33°32′N 60°15′E
- Country: Iran
- Province: South Khorasan
- County: Qaen
- Capital: Hajjiabad

Population (2011)
  - Total: 29,844
- Time zone: UTC+3:30 (IRST)

Zirkuh District (Persian: بخش زیرکوه) is a former administrative division of Qaen County, South Khorasan province, Iran. Its capital was the city of Hajjiabad.

== History ==
In 2011, the district was separated from the county in the establishment of Zirkuh County.

== Demographics ==
=== Population ===
At the time of the 2006 census, the district's population was 26,203 in 6,189 households. The following census in 2011 counted 29,844 people in 7,583 households.

=== Administrative divisions ===
Zirkuh District Population
Administrative Divisions	2006	2011
Petergan RD	5,865	6,375
Shaskuh RD	8,329	9,752
Zirkuh RD	7,676	7,799
Hajjiabad (city)	4,333	5,918
Total	26,203	29,844
RD = Rural District
