= Zirkuh Rural District (Zirkuh County) =

Rural district in South Khorasan province, Iran

Zirkuh Rural District Persian: دهستان زيركوه
- Rural District
- Location within Iran
- Coordinates: 33°24′N 60°11′E
- Country: Iran
- Province: South Khorasan
- County: Zirkuh
- District: Central
- Established: 1986
- Capital: Hajjiabad

Population (2016)
  - Total: 7,569
- Time zone: UTC+3:30 (IRST)

Zirkuh Rural District (Persian: دهستان زيركوه) is in the Central District of Zirkuh County, South Khorasan province, Iran. It is administered from the city of Hajjiabad.

== Demographics ==
=== Population ===
At the time of the 2006 National Census, the rural district's population (as a part of the former Zirkuh District in Qaen County) was 7,676 in 1,833 households. There were 7,799 inhabitants in 2,085 households at the following census of 2011. The 2016 census measured the population of the rural district as 7,569 in 2,100 households, by which time the district had been separated from the county in the establishment of Zirkuh County. The rural district was transferred to the new Central District. The most populous of its 41 villages was Bamrud, with 1,195 people.

=== Other villages in the rural district ===
- Ardakul
- Dustabad-e Bala
- Gozokht
- Hasanabad
- Hoseynabad-e Pain
- Mehmanshahr-e Ahangaran
- Mohammadabad
- Pishbar
- Sij-e Jadid
