= Central District (Zirkuh County) =

District in South Khorasan province, Iran

Central District (Zirkuh County) Persian: بخش مرکزی شهرستان زيركوه
- District
- Location within Iran
- Coordinates: 33°32′N 60°24′E
- Country: Iran
- Province: South Khorasan
- County: Zirkuh
- Established: 2011
- Capital: Hajjiabad

Population (2016)
  - Total: 19,713
- Time zone: UTC+3:30 (IRST)

The Central District of Zirkuh County (Persian: بخش مرکزی شهرستان زيركوه) is in South Khorasan province, Iran. Its capital is the city of Hajjiabad.

== History ==
In 2011, Zirkuh and Zohan Districts were separated from Qaen County in the establishment of Zirkuh County, which was divided into three districts of two rural districts each, with Hajjiabad as its capital.

== Demographics ==
=== Population ===
At the time of the 2016 National Census, the district's population was 19,713 inhabitants in 5,148 households.

=== Administrative divisions ===
Central District (Zirkuh County) Population
Administrative Divisions	2016
Petergan RD	5,976
Zirkuh RD	7,569
Hajjiabad (city)	6,168
Total	19,713
RD = Rural District

== See also ==
- Petregan playa
