= Zirkuh County =

County in South Khorasan province, Iran

Zirkuh County Persian: شهرستان زيركوه
- County
- Location of Zirkuh County in South Khorasan province (top right, green)

- Location of South Khorasan province in Iran
- Coordinates: 33°32′N 60°10′E
- Country: Iran
- Province: South Khorasan
- Established: 2011
- Capital: Hajjiabad
- Districts: Central, Shaskuh, Zohan

Population (2016)
  - Total: 40,155
- Time zone: UTC+3:30 (IRST)

Zirkuh County (Persian: شهرستان زيركوه) is in South Khorasan province, Iran. Its capital is the city of Hajjiabad.

== History ==
In 2011, Zirkuh and Zohan Districts were separated from Qaen County in the establishment of Zirkuh County, which was divided into three districts of two rural districts each, with Hajjiabad as its capital. The village of Abiz-e Jadid was converted to a city in 2018.

== Demographics ==
=== Population ===
At the time of the 2016 National Census, the county's population was 40,155 in 11,178 households.

=== Administrative divisions ===
Zirkuh County's population and administrative structure are shown in the following table..

Zirkuh County Population
Administrative Divisions	2016
Central District	19,713
Petergan RD	5,976
Zirkuh RD	7,569
Hajjiabad (city)	6,168
Shaskuh District	9,490
Bohnabad RD	5,468
Shaskuh RD	4,022
Abiz-e Jadid (city) (Note: Became a city after the 2016 census)	
Zohan District	10,952
Afin RD	4,699
Zohan RD	5,135
Zohan (city)	1,118
Total	40,155
RD = Rural District

== See also ==
Media related to Zirkuh County at Wikimedia Commons
