= Baghestan (disambiguation) =

Baghestan is a city in Tehran Province, Iran.

Baghestan (Persian: باغستان) may also refer to:

== Fars Province ==
- Baghestan, Fars, a village in Sepidan County
- Baghestan-e Abu ol Hayat, a village in Kazerun County
- Baghestan-e Kandehi, a village in Kazerun County
- Baghestan Rural District (Fars Province), in Bavanat County

== Hormozgan Province ==
- Baghestan, Bandar Abbas, a village in Bandar Abbas County
- Baghestan, Parsian, a village in Parsian County

== Isfahan Province ==
- Baghestan-e Bala, a village in Natanz County
- Baghestan-e Pain, a village in Natanz County

== Qazvin Province ==
- Baghestan, Qazvin, a village in Qazvin Province

== Semnan Province ==
- Baghestan, Shahrud, a village in Shahrud County

== South Khorasan Province ==
- Baghestan, Sarbisheh, a village in South Khorasan Province
- Baghestan, Zirkuh, a village in South Khorasan Province
- Baghestan-e Ferdows, a city in South Khorasan Province
- Baghestan (Ferdows County), a city in South Khorasan Province
- Baghestan-e Sofla, a village in South Khorasan Province
- Baghestan Rural District (South Khorasan Province), in South Khorasan Province

== West Azerbaijan Province ==
- Baghestan, West Azerbaijan, a village in Urmia County

== Yazd Province ==
- Baghestan, Yazd, a village in Taft County
