= Rahmatabad, Ferdows =

Village in South Khorasan province, Iran

Rahmatabad Persian: رحمت آباد
- Village
- Location within Iran
- Coordinates: 34°06′44″N 58°18′39″E
- Country: Iran
- Province: South Khorasan
- County: Ferdows
- District: Eslamiyeh
- Rural District: Baghestan

Population (2016)
  - Total: 16
- Time zone: UTC+3:30 (IRST)

Rahmatabad (Persian: رحمت آباد) (Note: Also romanized as Raḩmatābād; also known as Kalāteh-ye Mīrzā) is a village in Baghestan Rural District of Eslamiyeh District in Ferdows County, South Khorasan province, Iran.

== Demographics ==
=== Population ===
At the time of the 2006 National Census, the village's population was 18 in nine households, when it was in the Central District. The following census in 2011 counted 22 people in 10 households. The 2016 census measured the population of the village as 16 people in seven households.

In 2020, the rural district was separated from the district in the formation of Eslamiyeh District.
