= Torshizuk =

Village in South Khorasan province, Iran

Torshizuk Persian: ترشيزوك
- Village
- Location within Iran
- Coordinates: 34°09′47″N 58°23′42″E
- Country: Iran
- Province: South Khorasan
- County: Ferdows
- District: Eslamiyeh
- Rural District: Baghestan

Population (2016)
  - Total: 57
- Time zone: UTC+3:30 (IRST)

Torshizuk (Persian: ترشيزوك) (Note: Also romanized as Torshīzūk; also known as Torsh Shūk and Torsīzūk) is a village in Baghestan Rural District of Eslamiyeh District in Ferdows County, South Khorasan province, Iran.

== Demographics ==
=== Population ===
At the time of the 2006 National Census, the village's population was 84 in 32 households, when it was in the Central District. The following census in 2011 counted 60 people in 24 households. The 2016 census measured the population of the village as 57 people in 23 households.

In 2020, the rural district was separated from the district in the formation of Eslamiyeh District.
