= Cheshmeh-ye Khanom =

Village in South Khorasan province, Iran

Cheshmeh-ye Khanom Persian: چشمه خانم
- Village
- Location within Iran
- Coordinates: 34°12′53″N 57°59′51″E
- Country: Iran
- Province: South Khorasan
- County: Ferdows
- District: Eslamiyeh
- Rural District: Borun

Population (2016)
  - Total: Below reporting threshold
- Time zone: UTC+3:30 (IRST)

Cheshmeh-ye Khanom (Persian: چشمه خانم) (Note: Also romanized as Cheshmeh-ye Khānom) is a village in Borun Rural District of Eslamiyeh District in Ferdows County, South Khorasan province, Iran.

== Demographics ==
=== Population ===
At the time of the 2006 National Census, the village's population was 71 in 21 households, when it was in the Central District. The following census in 2011 counted 37 people in 13 households. The 2016 census measured the population of the village as below the reporting threshold.

In 2020, the rural district was separated from the district in the formation of Eslamiyeh District.
