= Bidesgan =

Village in South Khorasan province, Iran

Bidesgan Persian: بيدسگان
- Village
- Location within Iran
- Coordinates: 34°03′29″N 58°25′47″E
- Country: Iran
- Province: South Khorasan
- County: Ferdows
- District: Eslamiyeh
- Rural District: Baghestan

Population (2016)
  - Total: 185
- Time zone: UTC+3:30 (IRST)

Bidesgan (Persian: بيدسگان (Note: Also romanized as Bīdesgān and Bīdsagān; also known as Bīdeskān and Bidishkūn) is a village in Baghestan Rural District of Eslamiyeh District in Ferdows County, South Khorasan province, Iran.

== Demographics ==
=== Population ===
At the time of the 2006 National Census, the village's population was 309 in 145 households, when it was in the Central District. The following census in 2011 counted 255 people in 130 households. The 2016 census measured the population of the village as 185 people in 94 households.

In 2020, the rural district was separated from the district in the formation of Eslamiyeh District.
