= Abdaki =

Village in South Khorasan province, Iran

Abdaki Persian: ابدكي
- Village
- Location within Iran
- Coordinates: 34°16′32″N 58°02′26″E
- Country: Iran
- Province: South Khorasan
- County: Ferdows
- District: Eslamiyeh
- Rural District: Borun

Population (2016)
  - Total: 52
- Time zone: UTC+3:30 (IRST)

Abdaki (Persian: ابدكي) (Note: Also romanized as Ābdakī and Abdakī; also known as Kalāteh-ye Adakī) is a village in Borun Rural District of Eslamiyeh District in Ferdows County, South Khorasan province, Iran.

== Demographics ==
=== Population ===
At the time of the 2006 National Census, the village's population was 66 in 11 households, when it was in the Central District. The following census in 2011 counted 49 people in 11 households. The 2016 census measured the population of the village as 52 people in 19 households.

In 2020, the rural district was separated from the district in the formation of Eslamiyeh District.
