= Bekri-ye Pain =

Village in South Khorasan province, Iran

Bekri-ye Pain Persian: بِكری پائین
- Village
- Location within Iran
- Coordinates: 34°16′06″N 58°17′23″E
- Country: Iran
- Province: South Khorasan
- County: Ferdows
- District: Eslamiyeh
- Rural District: Borun

Population (2016)
  - Total: Below reporting threshold
- Time zone: UTC+3:30 (IRST)

Bekri-ye Pain (Persian: بِكری پائین) (Note: Also romanized as Bakrī-ye Pā’īn; also known as Bagrī-ye Pā’īn) is a village in Borun Rural District of Eslamiyeh District in Ferdows County, South Khorasan province, Iran.

== Demographics ==
=== Population ===
At the time of the 2006 National Census, the village's population was 10 in five households, when it was in the Central District. The following census in 2011 counted nine people in five households. The 2016 census measured the population of the village as below the reporting threshold.

In 2020, the rural district was separated from the district in the formation of Eslamiyeh District.
