= Zehr, Ferdows =

Village in South Khorasan province, Iran

Zehr Persian: ظِهر
- Village
- Location within Iran
- Coordinates: 34°13′07″N 58°21′24″E
- Country: Iran
- Province: South Khorasan
- County: Ferdows
- District: Eslamiyeh
- Rural District: Borun

Population (2016)
  - Total: 53
- Time zone: UTC+3:30 (IRST)

Zehr (Persian: ظِهر) (Note: Also romanized as Z̧ahr and Z̧ehr; also known as Kalāteh-ye Z̧ahr and Kalāteh-ye Z̧ehr) is a village in Borun Rural District of Eslamiyeh District in Ferdows County, South Khorasan province, Iran.

== Demographics ==
=== Population ===
At the time of the 2006 National Census, the village's population was 57 in 27 households, when it was in the Central District. The following census in 2011 counted 37 people in 21 households. The 2016 census measured the population of the village as 53 people in 23 households.

In 2020, the rural district was separated from the district in the formation of Eslamiyeh District.
