= Anarestanak =

Village in South Khorasan province, Iran

Anarestanak Persian: انارستانك
- Village
- Location within Iran
- Coordinates: 34°14′30″N 58°15′34″E
- Country: Iran
- Province: South Khorasan
- County: Ferdows
- District: Eslamiyeh
- Rural District: Borun

Population (2016)
  - Total: 263
- Time zone: UTC+3:30 (IRST)

Anarestanak (Persian: انارستانك) (Note: Also romanized as Anārestānak) is a village in Borun Rural District of Eslamiyeh District in Ferdows County, South Khorasan province, Iran.

== Demographics ==
=== Population ===
At the time of the 2006 National Census, the village's population was 324 in 111 households, when it was in the Central District. The following census in 2011 counted 285 people in 116 households. The 2016 census measured the population of the village as 263 people in 110 households.

In 2020, the rural district was separated from the district in the formation of Eslamiyeh District.
