= Mozaffari Protected Area =

Mozaffari Protected area
- منطقه حفاظت‌شده مظفری
- Location within Iran
- Location: Ferdows County, South Khorasan, Iran
- Nearest city: Ferdows
- Coordinates: 34°09′53″N 57°43′29″E
- Area: 92,808 hectares (229,330 acres)

Mozaffari Protected Area (Persian: منطقه حفاظت‌شده مظفری) is a protected area in west of Ferdows County in South Khorasan province. It is located 40 kilometers west of Ferdows city. Its area is 92,808 hectares (229,330 acres).

Polond desert and Ferdows Hole-in-the-Rock are located in Mozaffari Protected Area.

== Gallery ==
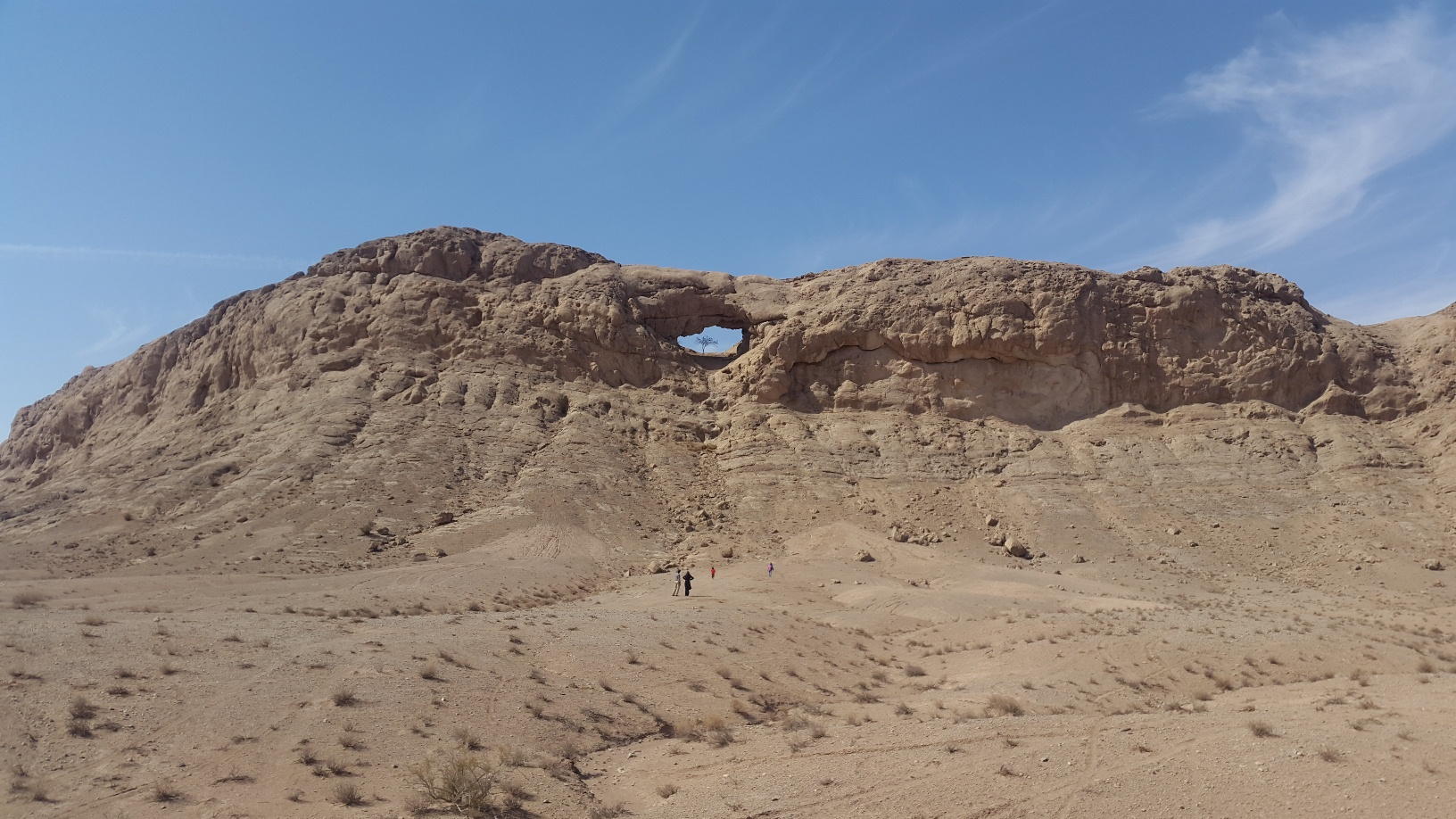
Ferdows Hole-in-the-Rock, a natural formation in Mozaffari Protected Area
