= Sorond, Ferdows =

Village in South Khorasan province, Iran

Sorond Persian: سرند
- Village
- Location within Iran
- Coordinates: 33°58′39″N 58°22′53″E
- Country: Iran
- Province: South Khorasan
- County: Ferdows
- District: Eslamiyeh
- Rural District: Baghestan

Population (2016)
  - Total: 417
- Time zone: UTC+3:30 (IRST)

Sorond (Persian: سرند) (Note: Also known as Sarūn) is a village in Baghestan Rural District of Eslamiyeh District in Ferdows County, South Khorasan province, Iran.

== Demographics ==
=== Population ===
At the time of the 2006 National Census, the village's population was 506 in 174 households, when it was in the Central District. The following census in 2011 counted 421 people in 155 households. The 2016 census measured the population of the village as 417 people in 169 households.

In 2020, the rural district was separated from the district in the formation of Eslamiyeh District.
