= Gastaj =

Village in South Khorasan province, Iran

Gastaj Persian: گستج
- Village
- Location within Iran
- Coordinates: 34°05′30″N 58°24′45″E
- Country: Iran
- Province: South Khorasan
- County: Ferdows
- District: Eslamiyeh
- Rural District: Baghestan

Population (2016)
  - Total: 217
- Time zone: UTC+3:30 (IRST)

Gastaj (Persian: گستج) (Note: Also romanized as Gostaj; also known as Gostabeḩ) is a village in Baghestan Rural District of Eslamiyeh District in Ferdows County, South Khorasan province, Iran.

== Demographics ==
=== Population ===
At the time of the 2006 National Census, the village's population was 353 in 122 households, when it was in the Central District. The following census in 2011 counted 279 people in 116 households. The 2016 census measured the population of the village as 217 people in 102 households.

In 2020, the rural district was separated from the district in the formation of Eslamiyeh District.
