= Badamuk =

Village in South Khorasan province, Iran

Badamuk Persian: باداموك
- Village
- Location within Iran
- Coordinates: 34°07′54″N 58°24′22″E
- Country: Iran
- Province: South Khorasan
- County: Ferdows
- District: Eslamiyeh
- Rural District: Baghestan

Population (2016)
  - Total: 209
- Time zone: UTC+3:30 (IRST)

Badamuk (Persian: باداموك) (Note: Also romanized as Bādāmūk; also known as Bādāmak, Bādāmūn, and Bādūmak) is a village in Baghestan Rural District of Eslamiyeh District in Ferdows County, South Khorasan province, Iran.

== Demographics ==
=== Population ===
At the time of the 2006 National Census, the village's population was 248 in 96 households, when it was in the Central District. The following census in 2011 counted 209 people in 82 households. The 2016 census measured the population of the village as 209 people in 82 households.

In 2020, the rural district was separated from the district in the formation of Eslamiyeh District.
