= Lajenu =

Village in South Khorasan province, Iran

Lajenu Persian: لجنو
- Village
- Location within Iran
- Coordinates: 34°16′42″N 58°20′13″E
- Country: Iran
- Province: South Khorasan
- County: Ferdows
- District: Eslamiyeh
- Rural District: Borun

Population (2016)
  - Total: 86
- Time zone: UTC+3:30 (IRST)

Lajenu (Persian: لجنو) (Note: Also romanized as Lajenū) is a village in Borun Rural District of Eslamiyeh District in Ferdows County, South Khorasan province, Iran.

== Demographics ==
=== Population ===
At the time of the 2006 National Census, the village's population was 42 in 11 households, when it was in the Central District. The following census in 2011 counted 74 people in 21 households. The 2016 census measured the population of the village as 84 people in 24 households.

In 2020, the rural district was separated from the district in the formation of Eslamiyeh District.
