= Khanik, Ferdows =

Village in South Khorasan province, Iran

Khanik Persian: خانيك
- Village
- Location within Iran
- Coordinates: 34°13′41″N 58°16′31″E
- Country: Iran
- Province: South Khorasan
- County: Ferdows
- District: Eslamiyeh
- Rural District: Borun

Population (2016)
  - Total: 333
- Time zone: UTC+3:30 (IRST)

Khanik (Persian: خانيك) (Note: Also romanized as Khānīk; also known as Khānīk Shāh) is a village in Borun Rural District of Eslamiyeh District in Ferdows County, South Khorasan province, Iran.

== Demographics ==
=== Population ===
At the time of the 2006 National Census, the village's population was 95 in 29 households, when it was in the Central District. The village did not appear in the following census of 2011. The 2016 census measured the population of the village as 333 people in 125 households.

In 2020, the rural district was separated from the district in the formation of Eslamiyeh District.
