= Kharv, South Khorasan =

Village in South Khorasan province, Iran

Kharu Persian: خرو
- Village
- Location within Iran
- Coordinates: 34°12′33″N 58°20′09″E
- Country: Iran
- Province: South Khorasan
- County: Ferdows
- District: Eslamiyeh
- Rural District: Borun

Population (2016)
  - Total: 135
- Time zone: UTC+3:30 (IRST)

Kharv (Persian: خرو) is a village in Borun Rural District of Eslamiyeh District in Ferdows County, South Khorasan province, Iran.

== Demographics ==
=== Population ===
At the time of the 2006 National Census, the village's population was 181 in 61 households, when it was in the Central District. The following census in 2011 counted 149 people in 56 households. The 2016 census measured the population of the village as 135 people in 52 households.

In 2020, the rural district was separated from the district in the formation of Eslamiyeh District.
