= Mehran Kushk =

Village in South Khorasan province, Iran

Mehran Kushk Persian: مهرانكوشك
- Village
- Location within Iran
- Coordinates: 34°07′04″N 58°14′30″E
- Country: Iran
- Province: South Khorasan
- County: Ferdows
- District: Eslamiyeh
- Rural District: Baghestan

Population (2016)
  - Total: 210
- Time zone: UTC+3:30 (IRST)

Mehran Kushk (Persian: مهرانكوشك) (Note: Also romanized as Mehrān Kūshk; also known as Mīrān Kush) is a village in Baghestan Rural District of Eslamiyeh District in Ferdows County, South Khorasan province, Iran.

== Demographics ==
=== Population ===
At the time of the 2006 National Census, the village's population was 418 in 139 households, when it was in the Central District. The following census in 2011 counted 265 people in 110 households. The 2016 census measured the population of the village as 210 people in 89 households.

In 2020, the rural district was separated from the district in the formation of Eslamiyeh District.
