= Borun, Iran =

Village in South Khorasan province, Iran

Borun Persian: برون
- Village
- Location within Iran
- Coordinates: 34°09′51″N 58°14′23″E
- Country: Iran
- Province: South Khorasan
- County: Ferdows
- District: Eslamiyeh
- Rural District: Borun

Population (2016)
  - Total: 644
- Time zone: UTC+3:30 (IRST)

Borun (Persian: برون) (Note: Also romanized as Borūn; also known as Baruq, Borāq, Borveh, and Buruh) is a village in, and the capital of, Borun Rural District in Eslamiyeh District of Ferdows County, South Khorasan province, Iran.

== Demographics ==
=== Population ===
At the time of the 2006 National Census, the village's population was 717 in 283 households, when it was in the Central District. The following census in 2011 counted 680 people in 260 households. The 2016 census measured the population of the village as 644 people in 251 households, the most populous in its rural district.

In 2020, the rural district was separated from the district in the formation of Eslamiyeh District.
