= Amrudkan =

Village in South Khorasan province, Iran

Amrudkan Persian: امرودكان
- Village
- Location within Iran
- Coordinates: 34°13′49″N 58°20′58″E
- Country: Iran
- Province: South Khorasan
- County: Ferdows
- District: Eslamiyeh
- Rural District: Borun

Population (2016)
  - Total: 86
- Time zone: UTC+3:30 (IRST)

Amrudkan (Persian: امرودكان) (Note: Also romanized as Amrūdkān) is a village in Borun Rural District of Eslamiyeh District in Ferdows County, South Khorasan province, Iran.

== Demographics ==
=== Population ===
At the time of the 2006 National Census, the village's population was 129 in 67 households, when it was in the Central District. The following census in 2011 counted 100 people in 52 households. The 2016 census measured the population of the village as 86 people in 49 households.

In 2020, the rural district was separated from the district in the formation of Eslamiyeh District.
