= Afqu =

Village in South Khorasan province, Iran

Afqu Persian: افقو
- Village
- Location within Iran
- Coordinates: 34°18′09″N 58°16′45″E
- Country: Iran
- Province: South Khorasan
- County: Ferdows
- District: Eslamiyeh
- Rural District: Borun

Population (2016)
  - Total: 64
- Time zone: UTC+3:30 (IRST)

Afqu (Persian: افقو) (Note: Also romanized as Afqū; also known as Afkān, Afqūy, Aughān, and Owghān) is a village in Borun Rural District of Eslamiyeh District in Ferdows County, South Khorasan province, Iran.

== Demographics ==
=== Population ===
At the time of the 2006 National Census, the village's population was 95 in 43 households, when it was in the Central District. The following census in 2011 counted 70 people in 35 households. The 2016 census measured the population of the village as 64 people in 31 households.

In 2020, the rural district was separated from the district in the formation of Eslamiyeh District.
