= Taheriyeh =

Village in South Khorasan province, Iran

Hoseynabad Persian: حسين اباد
- Village
- Location within Iran
- Coordinates: 34°07′04″N 57°57′04″E
- Country: Iran
- Province: South Khorasan
- County: Ferdows
- District: Central
- Rural District: Howmeh

Population (2016)
  - Total: 385
- Time zone: UTC+3:30 (IRST)

Taheriyeh (Persian: طاهريه) (Note: Also romanized as Tāherīyeh) is a village in Howmeh Rural District of the Central District in Ferdows County, South Khorasan province, Iran.

== Demographics ==
=== Population ===
At the time of the 2006 National Census, the village's population was 292 in 64 households. The following census in 2011 counted 170 people in 42 households. The 2016 census measured the population of the village as 156 people in 53 households.
