= Mahvid Mosque =

Mosque in Mahvid, Ferdows, Iran

- مسجد مهوید
- Location of the mosque in Iran

Religion
- Affiliation: Shia Islam
- Ecclesiastical or organizational status: Mosque
- Status: Active

Location
- Location: Mahvid, Ferdows County, South Khorasan Province
- Country: Iran
- Interactive map of Mahvid Mosque
- Coordinates: 34°11′07″N 58°23′22″E

Architecture
- Type: Mosque architecture
- Style: Qajar
- Completed: 18th century (Qajar era)
- Dome: One (maybe more)

Iran National Heritage List
- Official name: Mahvid Mosque
- Type: Built
- Designated: 24 May 2007
- Reference no.: 19103
- Conservation organization: Cultural Heritage, Handicrafts and Tourism Organization of Iran

The Mahvid Mosque (Persian: مسجد مهوید; Arabic: مسجد مهويد) is a Shi'ite mosque located in Mahvid, in the county of Ferdows, in the province of South Khorasan, Iran. The mosque was completed during the Qajar era.

The mosque was added to the Iran National Heritage List on 24 May 2007, administered by the Cultural Heritage, Handicrafts and Tourism Organization of Iran.

== See also ==
- Shia Islam in Iran
- List of mosques in Iran
