= Chah-e Now =

Village in South Khorasan province, Iran

Chah-e Now Persian: خانكوك
- Village
- Location within Iran
- Coordinates: 34°15′19″N 57°36′24″E
- Country: Iran
- Province: South Khorasan
- County: Ferdows
- District: Central
- Rural District: Howmeh

Population (2016)
  - Total: 229
- Time zone: UTC+3:30 (IRST)

Chah-e Now (Persian: خانكوك) (Note: Also romanized as Chāh-e Now) is a village in Howmeh Rural District of the Central District in Ferdows County, South Khorasan province, Iran.

== Demographics ==
=== Population ===
At the time of the 2006 National Census, the village's population was 190 in 49 households. The following census in 2011 counted 217 people in 59 households. The 2016 census measured the population of the village as 229 people in 69 households.
