= Fathabad, Ferdows =

Village in South Khorasan province, Iran

Fathabad Persian: فتح اباد
- Village
- Location within Iran
- Coordinates: 34°07′03″N 58°23′14″E
- Country: Iran
- Province: South Khorasan
- County: Ferdows
- District: Eslamiyeh
- Rural District: Baghestan

Population (2016)
  - Total: 401
- Time zone: UTC+3:30 (IRST)

Fathabad (Persian: فتح اباد) (Note: Also romanized as Fatḩābād) is a village in Baghestan Rural District of Eslamiyeh District in Ferdows County, South Khorasan province, Iran.

== Demographics ==
=== Population ===
At the time of the 2006 National Census, the village's population was 438 in 185 households, when it was in the Central District. The following census in 2011 counted 423 people in 189 households. The 2016 census measured the population of the village as 401 people in 184 households.

In 2020, the rural district was separated from the district in the formation of Eslamiyeh District.
