= Fereyduni =

Fereyduni or Fereidooni (Persian: فريدوني) may refer to:

- Fereyduni, Khuzestan
- Fereyduni, South Khorasan

== See also ==
- Fereydun
