= Hole-in-the-Rock =

Hole-in-the-Rock or Hole in the Rock may refer to:

- Ferdows Hole-in-the-Rock, a natural geological formation west of Ferdows, South Khorasan Province, Iran
- Hole in the Rock (New Zealand), a natural coastal formation in the Bay of Islands, New Zealand
- Hole-in-the-Rock (Papago Park), a geological formation of tafoni in sandstone in Papago Park, Phoenix, Arizona, U.S.
- Hole in the Rock (rock formation), a crevice in the western rim of Glen Canyon, Utah, U.S.
- Hole in the Rock Trail, a trail between Escalante and Bluff, Utah, U.S.
- Hole N" The Rock, a former underground home, now a tourist attraction near Moab, Utah, U.S.
