= Qal'eh Dokhtar, Ferdows =

Qal'eh Dokhtar
- قلعه دختر
- Location within Iran

General information
- Type: Castle
- Location: Ferdows, Iran
- Coordinates: 34.07256°N 58.08472°E

Qal'eh Dokhtar, Ferdows (Persian: قلعه دختر فردوس), also the Ghal'eh Kuh of Hasanabad (Persian: قلعه کوه حسن‌آباد), is a small ruined fortress located north west of Ferdows (Tun) and near the village Hasanabad in South Khorasan Province, Iran. The fortress was used by the Nizari Ismailis of the Alamut period.

It was connected to the nearby major stronghold of Ghal'eh Kuh of Ferdows and to the city of Tun itself via secret subterranean passages discovered after the 1968 Dasht-e Bayaz and Ferdows earthquakes.

The fortifications of Tun were destroyed in May 1256 by the invading Mongols under Kitbuqa and Köke Ilgei.
