= Ebrahimabad, Ferdows =

Village in South Khorasan province, Iran

Ebrahimabad Persian: ابراهيم اباد
- Village
- Location within Iran
- Coordinates: 34°07′30″N 57°57′18″E
- Country: Iran
- Province: South Khorasan
- County: Ferdows
- District: Central
- Rural District: Howmeh

Population (2016)
  - Total: 263
- Time zone: UTC+3:30 (IRST)

Ebrahimabad (Persian: ابراهيم اباد) (Note: Also romanized as Ebrāhīmābād; also known as Kalāteh-ye Khān) is a village in Howmeh Rural District of the Central District in Ferdows County, South Khorasan province, Iran.

== Demographics ==
=== Population ===
At the time of the 2006 National Census, the village's population was 62 in 19 households. The following census in 2011 counted 228 people in 59 households. The 2016 census measured the population of the village as 263 people in 89 households.
