= Jameh Mosque of Fathabad =

Shi'ite mosque in Fathabad, South Khorasan, Iran

Jāmeh Mosque of Fathabad
- مسجد فتح‌آباد
- Location of the mosque in Iran

Religion
- Affiliation: Shia Islam
- Ecclesiastical or organizational status: Friday mosque
- Status: Active

Location
- Location: Fathabad, Ferdows County, South Khorasan Province
- Country: Iran
- Interactive map of Jāmeh Mosque of Fathabad
- Coordinates: 34°07′06″N 58°23′07″E

Architecture
- Type: Mosque architecture
- Style: Qajar

Iran National Heritage List
- Official name: Jāmeh Mosque of Fathabad
- Type: Built
- Designated: unknown
- Reference no.: 16325
- Conservation organization: Cultural Heritage, Handicrafts and Tourism Organization of Iran

The Jāmeh Mosque of Fathabad (Persian: مسجد فتح‌آباد; Arabic: جامع فتح أباد) is a Shi'ite Friday mosque (jāmeh), located in the village of Fathabad, in the central part of the Ferdows County, in the province of South Khorasan, Iran.

Completed during the Qajar era, the mosque was added to the Iran National Heritage List, administered by the Cultural Heritage, Handicrafts and Tourism Organization of Iran.

== See also ==
- Shia Islam in Iran
- List of mosques in Iran
