= Fereyduni, South Khorasan =

Village in South Khorasan province, Iran

Fereyduni Persian: فريدوني
- Village
- Location within Iran
- Coordinates: 34°08′49″N 58°21′37″E
- Country: Iran
- Province: South Khorasan
- County: Ferdows
- District: Eslamiyeh
- Rural District: Baghestan

Population (2016)
  - Total: 52
- Time zone: UTC+3:30 (IRST)

Fereyduni (Persian: فريدوني) (Note: Also romanized as Fereydūnī) is a village in Baghestan Rural District of Eslamiyeh District in Ferdows County, South Khorasan province, Iran.

== Demographics ==
=== Population ===
At the time of the 2006 National Census, the village's population was 57 in 21 households, when it was in the Central District. The following census in 2011 counted 55 people in 20 households. The 2016 census measured the population of the village as 52 people in 20 households.

In 2020, the rural district was separated from the district in the formation of Eslamiyeh District.
