= Baghestan-e Sofla =

Village in South Khorasan province, Iran

Baghestan-e Sofla Persian: باغستان سفلي
- Village
- Location within Iran
- Coordinates: 34°04′21″N 58°15′34″E
- Country: Iran
- Province: South Khorasan
- County: Ferdows
- District: Eslamiyeh
- Rural District: Baghestan

Population (2016)
  - Total: 707
- Time zone: UTC+3:30 (IRST)

Baghestan-e Sofla (Persian: باغستان سفلي) (Note: Also romanized as Bāghestān-e Soflá; also known as Bāghestān-e Pā’īn and Sar Āsīāb-e Mīrzā) is a village in, and the capital of, Baghestan Rural District in Eslamiyeh District of Ferdows County, South Khorasan province, Iran. The previous capital of the rural district was the village of Baghestan-e Olya, now the city of Baghestan.

== Demographics ==
=== Population ===
At the time of the 2006 National Census, the village's population was 610 in 188 households, when it was in the Central District. The following census in 2011 counted 675 people in 221 households. The 2016 census measured the population of the village as 707 people in 223 households.

In 2020, the rural district was separated from the district in the formation of Eslamiyeh District.
