= Khanekuk =

Village in South Khorasan province, Iran

Khanekuk Persian: خانكوک
- Village
- Location within Iran
- Coordinates: 34°01′48″N 58°06′43″E
- Country: Iran
- Province: South Khorasan
- County: Ferdows
- District: Central
- Rural District: Howmeh

Population (2016)
  - Total: 1,099
- Time zone: UTC+3:30 (IRST)

Khanekuk (Persian: خانكوک) (Note: Also romanized as Khanekūk; also known as Khanehkūk and Khāneh-ye Kūk) is a village in, and the capital of, Howmeh Rural District in the Central District of Ferdows County, South Khorasan province, Iran.

== Demographics ==
=== Population ===
At the time of the 2006 National Census, the village's population was 926 in 259 households. The following census in 2011 counted 1,018 people in 314 households. The 2016 census measured the population of the village as 1,099 people in 341 households. It was the most populous village in its rural district.
