= Mahvid =

Village in South Khorasan province, Iran

Mahvid Persian: مهويد
- Village
- Location within Iran
- Coordinates: 34°11′02″N 58°23′05″E
- Country: Iran
- Province: South Khorasan
- County: Ferdows
- District: Eslamiyeh
- Rural District: Baghestan

Population (2016)
  - Total: 198
- Time zone: UTC+3:30 (IRST)

Mahvid (Persian: مهويد) (Note: Also romanized as Mahvīd) is a village in Baghestan Rural District of Eslamiyeh District in Ferdows County, South Khorasan province, Iran.

== Demographics ==
=== Population ===
At the time of the 2006 National Census, the village's population was 289 in 115 households, when it was in the Central District. The following census in 2011 counted 225 people in 105 households. The 2016 census measured the population of the village as 198 people in 94 households.

In 2020, the rural district was separated from the district in the formation of Eslamiyeh District.
