= Chah-e Palvand =

Village in South Khorasan province, Iran

Chah-e Palvand Persian: چاه پالوند
- Village
- Location within Iran
- Coordinates: 34°09′43″N 57°42′34″E
- Country: Iran
- Province: South Khorasan
- County: Ferdows
- District: Central
- Rural District: Howmeh

Population (2016)
  - Total: 0
- Time zone: UTC+3:30 (IRST)

Chah-e Palvand (Persian: چاه پالوند) (Note: Also romanized as Chāh-e Pālvand) is a village in Howmeh Rural District of the Central District in Ferdows County, South Khorasan province, Iran.

== Demographics ==
=== Population ===
At the time of the 2006 National Census, the village's population was 29 in 10 households. The following census in 2011 counted a population below the reporting threshold. The 2016 census measured the population of the village as zero.
