= Kajeh, South Khorasan =

Village in South Khorasan province, Iran

Kajeh Persian: كجه
- Village
- Location within Iran
- Coordinates: 34°12′56″N 57°46′04″E
- Country: Iran
- Province: South Khorasan
- County: Ferdows
- District: Central
- Rural District: Howmeh

Population (2016)
  - Total: 361
- Time zone: UTC+3:30 (IRST)

Kajeh (Persian: كجه) is a village in Howmeh Rural District of the Central District in Ferdows County, South Khorasan province, Iran.

== Demographics ==
=== Population ===
At the time of the 2006 National Census, the village's population was 343 in 90 households. The following census in 2011 counted 316 people in 96 households. The 2016 census measured the population of the village as 361 people in 112 households.
