= Qal'eh Kuh of Ferdows =

Ismaili castle in Quhistan

Coordinates: 33.91°N 58.14°E

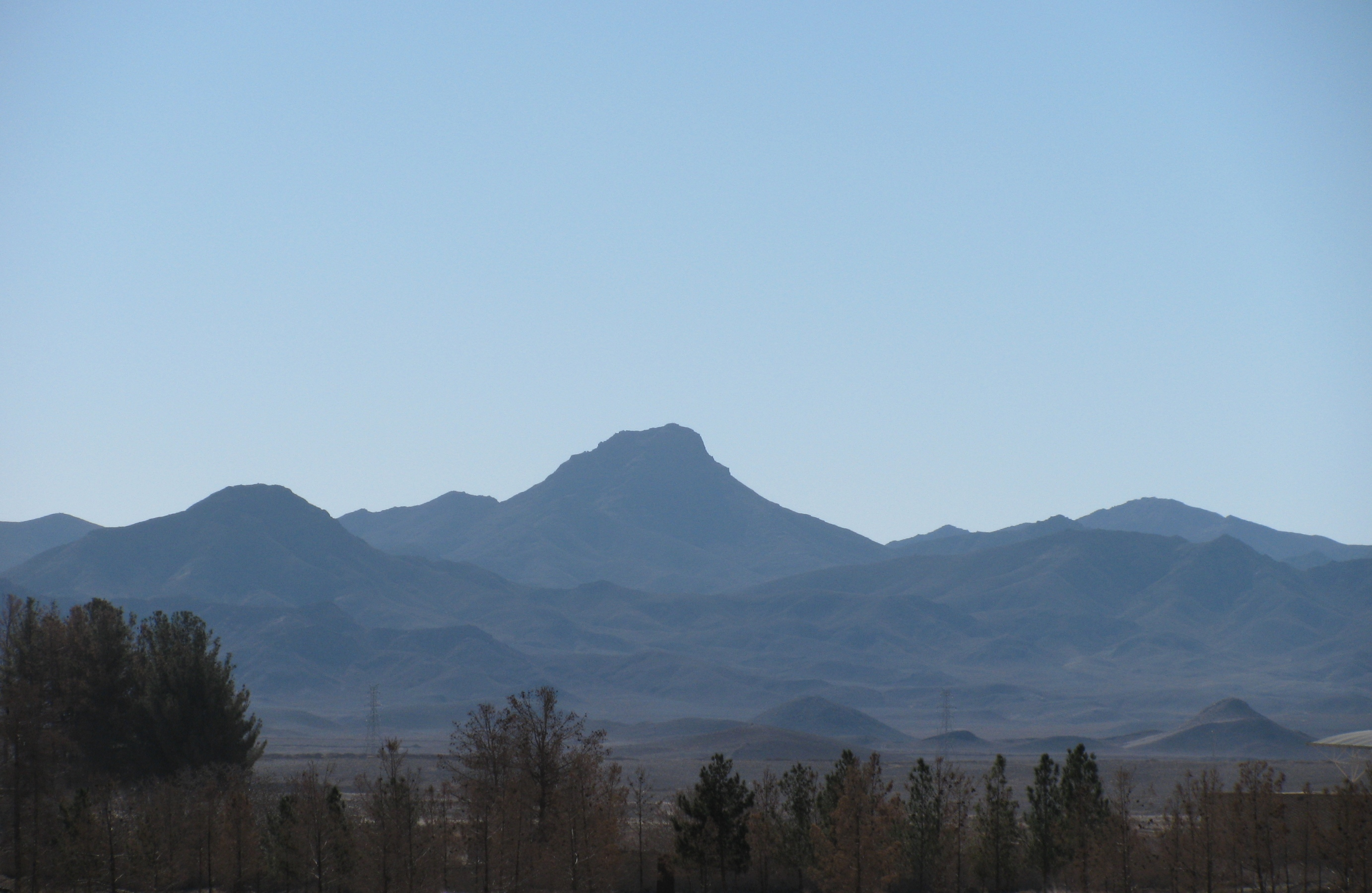
Ghal'eh Kuh mountain

Ghal'eh Kuh of Ferdows (Persian: قلعه کوه فردوس) is a ruined fortress on top of Kuh-e Ghal'eh (کوه قلعه), located south of Ferdows (Tun) in South Khorasan Province, Iran. The fortress was famously used by the Nizari Ismailis of the Alamut period, and was the biggest Nizari stronghold in the Quhistan region, according to the Tarikh-i Jahangushay.

It was connected to the nearby Ghal'eh Kuh of Hasanabad (also known as Ghal'eh Dokhtar) and to the city of Tun itself via secret subterranean passages discovered after the 1968 Dasht-e Bayaz and Ferdows earthquakes.

The fortress was destroyed and burned in May 1256 after its capture by the invading Mongols under Kitbuqa and Köke Ilgei.
