= Khanik Castle =

Castle in South Khorasan Province, Iran

Khanik castle
- قلعه خانیک

General information
- Type: Castle
- Location: Ferdows County, Iran

Khanik castle (Persian: قلعه خانیک) is a historical castle located in Ferdows County in South Khorasan Province, The longevity of this fortress dates back to the Age of Insecurity and the Absence of Security Forces (Nizari Ismaili state).
