= Baghestan Rural District =

Baghestan Rural District (Persian: دهستان باغستان) may refer to:

- Baghestan Rural District (Fars Province)
- Baghestan Rural District (South Khorasan Province)
