= Hoseynabad, Ferdows =

Village in South Khorasan province, Iran

Hoseynabad Persian: حسين اباد
- Village
- Location within Iran
- Coordinates: 34°03′33″N 58°06′29″E
- Country: Iran
- Province: South Khorasan
- County: Ferdows
- District: Central
- Rural District: Howmeh

Population (2016)
  - Total: 385
- Time zone: UTC+3:30 (IRST)

Hoseynabad (Persian: حسين‌آباد) (Note: Also romanized as Ḩoseynābād; also known as Ḩasanābād) is a village in Howmeh Rural District of the Central District in Ferdows County, South Khorasan province, Iran.

== Demographics ==
=== Population ===
At the time of the 2006 National Census, the village's population was 377 in 105 households. The following census in 2011 counted 363 people in 108 households. The 2016 census measured the population of the village as 385 people in 120 households.
