= Alireza Danesh Sokhanvar =

Shia missionary and social movement leader

Alireza Danesh Sokhanvar (1921–2000), commonly known as Danesh Sokhanvar, was a cleric from Ayask, Khorasan, in Iran. A Shia missionary and social movement leader, he built a city based on Islamic thought that called Islamiyeh (near Ferdows city) after the 1968 Dasht-e Bayaz and Ferdows earthquake.

He brought electricity to Islamiyeh by building a power plant. Also building an infirmary, some therms in south Khorasan, roads, planting trees nearby roads, pest control (by buying dead insect pests), made improvements on roads.

He died in 2000 in Mashhad.

He played a role in completing Blue Mosque of Germany .
