= Tuni (disambiguation) =

Tuni is a City in Andhra Pradesh, India.

Tuni or TUNI may also refer to:

- TUNI, Tampere Universities, in Finland
- Tuni (footballer), Spanish footballer
- Tuni language (Ivory Coast)
- Tunni language, spoken in Somalia
- Tuni (Assembly constituency), centred on the Indian town
- Tuni railway station, Andhra Pradesh, a railway station in the Indian town of Tuni
- Tuni railway station, Adelaide, a railway station in Australia
- Mulla Alaul Maulk Tuni, a 17th-century Iranian architect

== See also ==
- Toonie, a Canadian coin
