= Jameh Mosque of Ferdows =

Shi'ite mosque in Ferdows, South Khorasan, Iran

Jāmeh Mosque of Ferdows
- مسجد جامع تون/فردوس
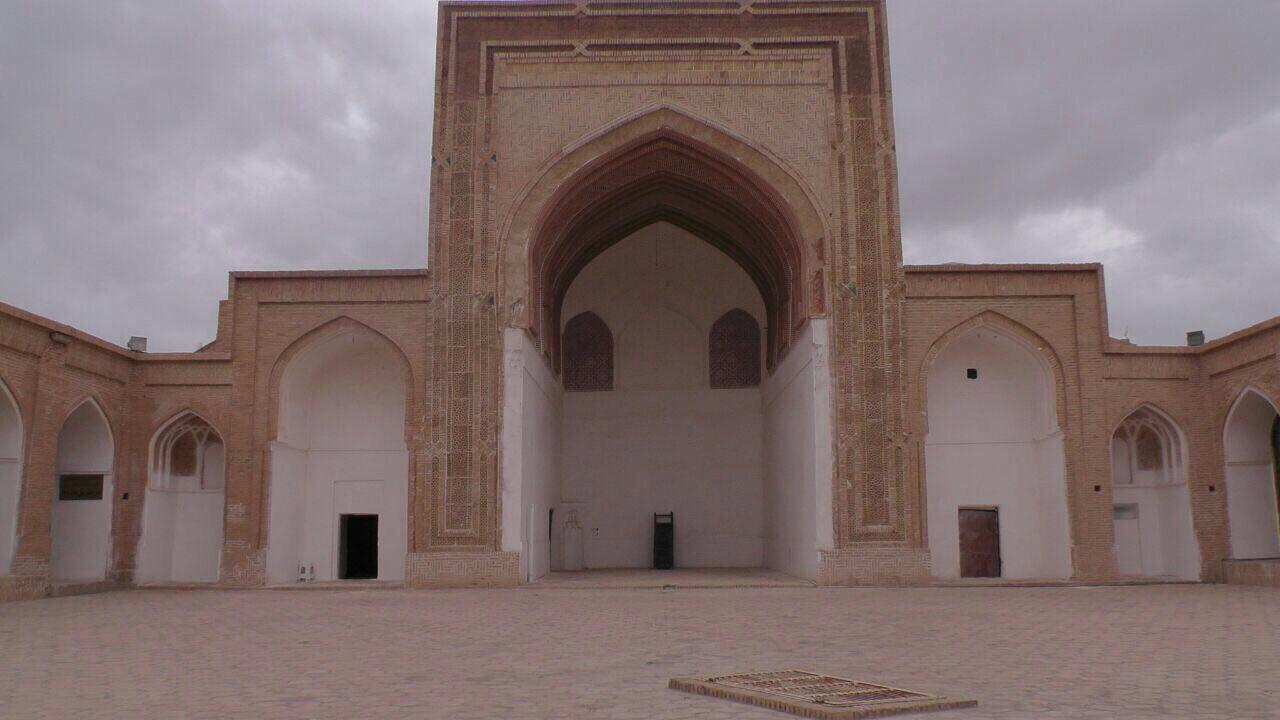

- Location of the mosque in Iran

Religion
- Affiliation: Shia Islam
- Ecclesiastical or organisational status: Friday mosque
- Status: Active

Location
- Location: Ferdows, Ferdows County, South Khorasan Province
- Country: Iran
- Interactive map of Jāmeh Mosque of Ferdows
- Coordinates: 34°0′25″N 58°9′33″E

Architecture
- Type: Mosque architecture
- Style: Seljuk; Khwarazmian
- Completed: 7th century CE; 1010 CE (official opening)
- Materials: Brick; plaster

Iran National Heritage List
- Official name: Jāmeh Mosque of Ferdows
- Type: Built
- Designated: 15 December 1975
- Reference no.: 1222
- Conservation organization: Cultural Heritage, Handicrafts and Tourism Organization of Iran

The Jāmeh Mosque of Ferdows (Persian: مسجد جامع تون/فردوس, romanized: Masjid-e-Jāmeh Toon/Ferdows; Arabic: جامع فردوس), also known as the Jāmeh Mosque of Tun and the Jāmeh Mosque of Toon, is a Shi'ite Friday mosque (jāmeh), located in the center of the town of Toon, in the city of Ferdows, in the province of South Khorasan, Iran.

It is mostly believed that this mosque was built during the Seljuk era, in the 11th century, but some researchers believe that it was constructed in the 7th century. The mosque was added to the Iran National Heritage List on 15 December 1975, administered by the Cultural Heritage, Handicrafts and Tourism Organization of Iran.

== See also ==
- Shia Islam in Iran
- List of mosques in Iran
