= Borun Rural District =

Rural district in South Khorasan province, Iran

Borun Rural District Persian: دهستان برون
- Rural District
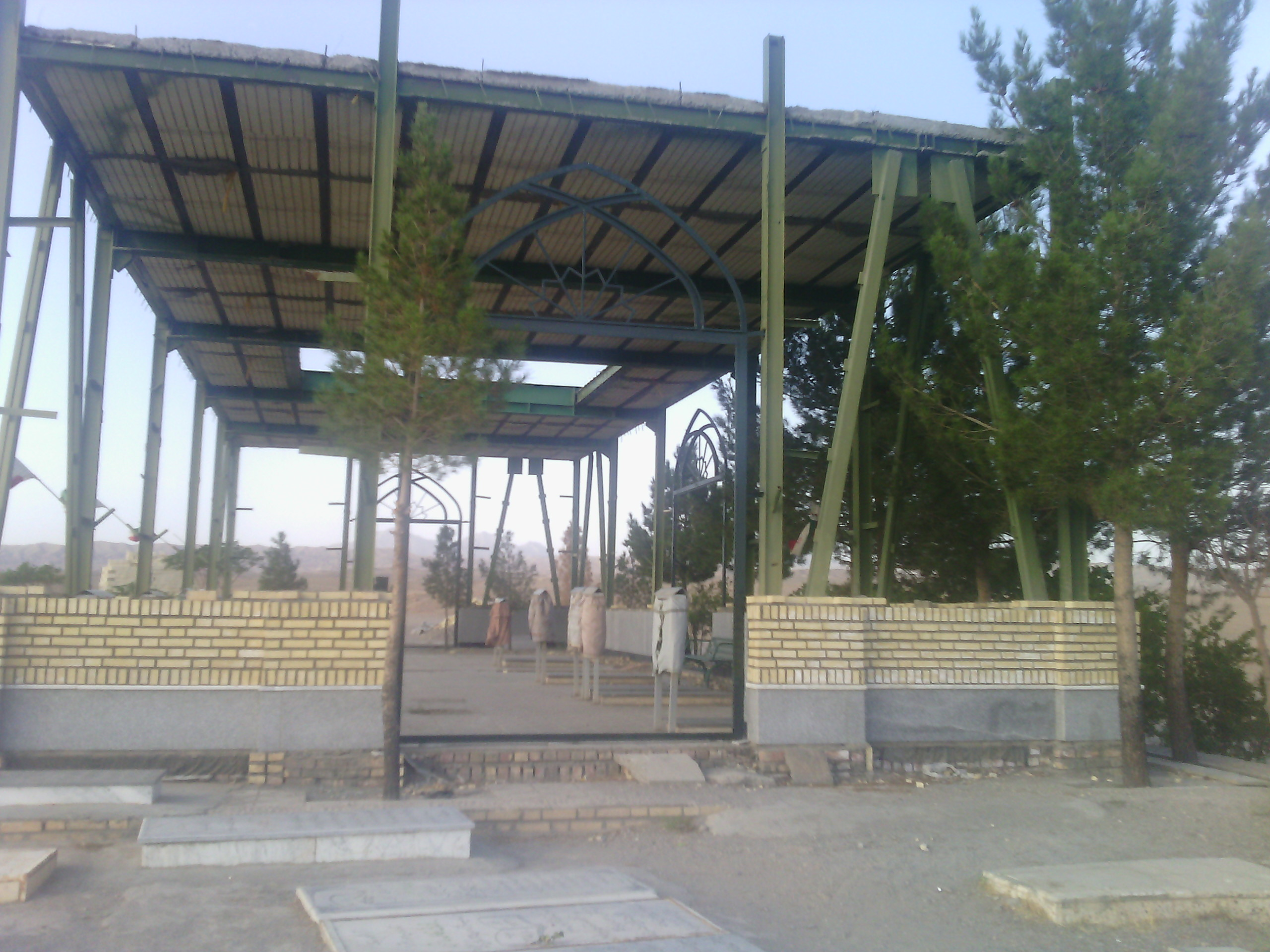

- Location within Iran
- Coordinates: 34°12′N 58°10′E
- Country: Iran
- Province: South Khorasan
- County: Ferdows
- District: Eslamiyeh
- Established: 1990
- Capital: Borun

Population (2016)
  - Total: 1,721
- Time zone: UTC+3:30 (IRST)

Borun Rural District (Persian: دهستان برون) is in Eslamiyeh District of Ferdows County, South Khorasan province, Iran. Its capital is the village of Borun.

== Demographics ==
=== Population ===
At the time of the 2006 National Census, the rural district's population (as a part of the Central District) was 2,048 in 760 households. There were 1,835 inhabitants in 719 households at the following census of 2011. The 2016 census measured the population of the rural district as 1,721 in 687 households. The most populous of its 40 villages was Borun, with 644 people.

In 2020, the rural district was separated from the district in the formation of Eslamiyeh District.

=== Other villages in the rural district ===
- Abdaki
- Afqu
- Amrudkan
- Anarestanak
- Bekri-ye Pain
- Cheshmeh-ye Khanom
- Khanik
- Kharv
- Lajenu
- Zehr
