= Howmeh Rural District (Ferdows County) =

Rural district in South Khorasan province, Iran

Howmeh Rural District Persian: دهستان حومه
- Rural District
- Location within Iran
- Coordinates: 33°51′N 57°53′E
- Country: Iran
- Province: South Khorasan
- County: Ferdows
- District: Central
- Established: 1993
- Capital: Khanekuk

Population (2016)
  - Total: 2,561
- Time zone: UTC+3:30 (IRST)

Howmeh Rural District (Persian: دهستان حومه) is in the Central District of Ferdows County, South Khorasan province, Iran. Its capital is the village of Khanekuk.

== Demographics ==
=== Population ===
At the time of the 2006 National Census, the rural district's population was 2,286 in 625 households. There were 2,378 inhabitants in 698 households at the following census of 2011. The 2016 census measured the population of the rural district as 2,561 in 810 households. The most populous of its 142 villages was Khanekuk, with 1,099 people.

=== Other villages in the rural district ===
- Chah-e Now
- Chah-e Palvand
- Ebrahimabad
- Hoseynabad
- Kajeh
- Taheriyeh
