= Baghestan, Ferdows =

City in South Khorasan province, Iran

Baghestan Persian: باغستان
- City
- Location within Iran
- Coordinates: 34°06′15″N 58°17′42″E
- Country: Iran
- Province: South Khorasan
- County: Ferdows
- District: Eslamiyeh
- Established as a city: 2020

Population (2016)
  - Total: 2,704
- Time zone: UTC+3:30 (IRST)

Baghestan (Persian: باغستان) (Note: Also romanized as Bāghestān; also known as Bāghestān-e Ferdows; formerly Baghestan-e Olya (باغستان عليا), also romanized as Bāghestān-e Olyā; and also known as Bāghestān-e Bālā) is a city in Eslamiyeh District of Ferdows County, South Khorasan province, Iran. As the village of Baghestan-e Olya, it was the capital of Baghestan Rural District until its capital was transferred to the village of Baghestan-e Sofla.

== Demographics ==
=== Population ===
At the time of the 2006 National Census, the population was 2,044 in 628 households, when it was a village in Baghestan Rural District of the Central District. The following census in 2011 counted 2,467 people in 739 households. The 2016 census measured the population of the village as 2,704 people in 757 households, the most populous in its rural district.

In 2020, the rural district was separated from the district in the formation of Eslamiyeh District. At the same time, Baghestan-e Olya was converted to a city and renamed Baghestan.
