= Baghestan, West Azerbaijan =

Baghestan باغستان
- Village
- Location within Iran
- Coordinates: 37°42′35″N 45°05′30″E
- Country: Iran
- Province: West Azerbaijan
- County: Urmia
- Bakhsh: Nazlu
- Rural District: Nazlu-e Shomali

Population (2006)
  - Total: 309
- Time zone: UTC+3:30 (IRST)
  - Summer (DST): UTC+4:30 (IRDT)

Baghestan (Persian: باغستان, also Romanized as Bāghestān; also known as Gījelar) is a village in Nazlu-e Shomali Rural District, Nazlu District, Urmia County, West Azerbaijan Province, Iran. At the 2006 census, its population was 309, in 82 families.
