= Baghestan, Yazd =

Baghestan باغستان
- Village
- Location within Iran
- Coordinates: 31°38′19″N 54°08′34″E
- Country: Iran
- Province: Yazd
- County: Taft
- Bakhsh: Central
- Rural District: Shirkuh

Population (2006)
  - Total: 46
- Time zone: UTC+3:30 (IRST)
  - Summer (DST): UTC+4:30 (IRDT)

Baghestan (Persian: باغستان, also Romanized as Bāghestān; also known as Maḩalleh-ye Bāghestān) is a village in Shirkuh Rural District, in the Central District of Taft County, Yazd Province, Iran. At the 2006 census, its population was 46, in 21 families.
