= Baghestan-e Abu ol Hayat =

Baghestan-e Abu ol Hayat باغستان ابوالحيات
- Village
- Country: Iran
- Province: Fars
- County: Kazerun
- Bakhsh: Kuhmareh
- Rural District: Kuhmareh

Population (2006)
  - Total: 19
- Time zone: UTC+3:30 (IRST)
  - Summer (DST): UTC+4:30 (IRDT)

Baghestan-e Abu ol Hayat (Persian: باغستان ابوالحيات, also Romanized as Bāghestān-e Abū ol Ḩayāt) is a village in Kuhmareh Rural District, Kuhmareh District, Kazerun County, Fars province, Iran. At the 2006 census, its population was 19, in 4 families.
