= Baghestan-e Kandehi =

Baghestan-e Kandehi باغستان كنده اي
- Village
- Location within Iran
- Coordinates: 29°44′17″N 51°48′55″E
- Country: Iran
- Province: Fars
- County: Kazerun
- Bakhsh: Kuhmareh
- Rural District: Kuhmareh

Population (2006)
  - Total: 714
- Time zone: UTC+3:30 (IRST)
  - Summer (DST): UTC+4:30 (IRDT)

Baghestan-e Kandehi (Persian: باغستان كنده اي, also Romanized as Bāghestān-e Kandeh’ī; also known as Kandai, Kandeh, Kandī, and Kondeh) is a village in Kuhmareh Rural District, Kuhmareh District, Kazerun County, Fars province, Iran. At the 2006 census, its population was 714, in 164 families.
