= Ferdows Hot Spring =

Hot mineral spring in Ferdows County, Iran

Coordinates: 34°08′17″N 58°12′57″E

Ferdows Hot Spring or Ferdows Warm Spring (Persian: آبگرم معدنی فردوس, romanized: Abgarm-e Ma'dani-ye Ferdows) is a hot mineral spring located about 20 km (12 mi) north of Ferdows in eastern Iran.
