= Hole N" The Rock =

Tourist attraction in southeastern Utah

Coordinates: 38.3907579°N 109.4566053°W

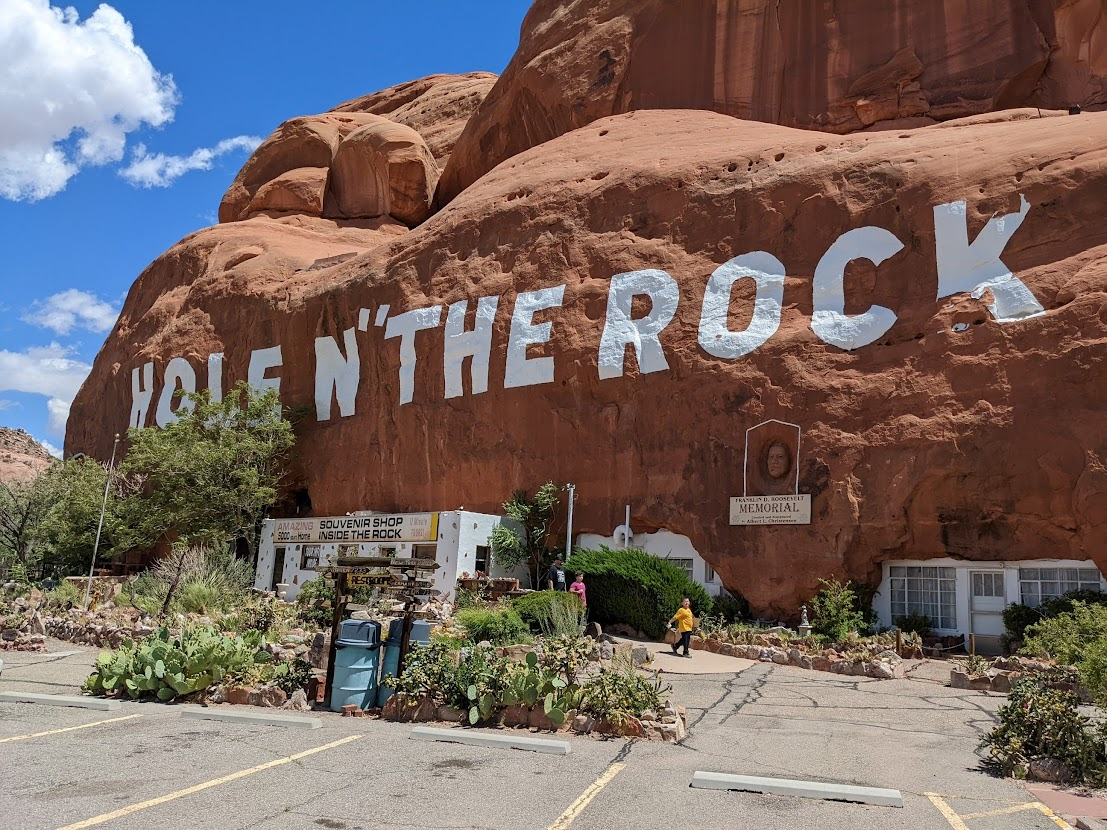
Hole N" The Rock, June 2022

Hole N" The Rock is a roadside attraction located in San Juan County, Utah, centered around a home carved out of a sandstone cliff. Albert Christensen began creating the home in 1940; the Christensen family moved into the home in 1952 and the site was opened to public tours after Albert's death in 1957. The adjacent Hole N" The Rock diner was opened in 1945 and operated until 1955. A petting zoo and gift shops were added to the site by subsequent owners. The attraction is a popular stop for visitors to southeastern Utah.

== Description ==
Hole N" The Rock is built around the home created by Albert Christensen in the 1940s and early 1950s. The home, 5,000 square feet (460 m^{2}) large, contains fourteen rooms supported by large pillars. The home includes shelving carved out of the walls and a fireplace with a 65-foot chimney drilled into the sandstone. A large concrete bathtub is also built into the rock. Each room includes the original furniture and belongings owned by the Christensens, with some rooms containing taxidermied animals prepared by Albert.

Eleven eclectic metal and stone sculptures by Colorado artist Lyle Nichols are located on the grounds. A petting zoo filled with animals such as llamas, emus, and wallabies is also part of the site.

The site, advertised with twenty-foot-tall white letters on the cliff above, attracts about 500 visitors per day.

== History ==
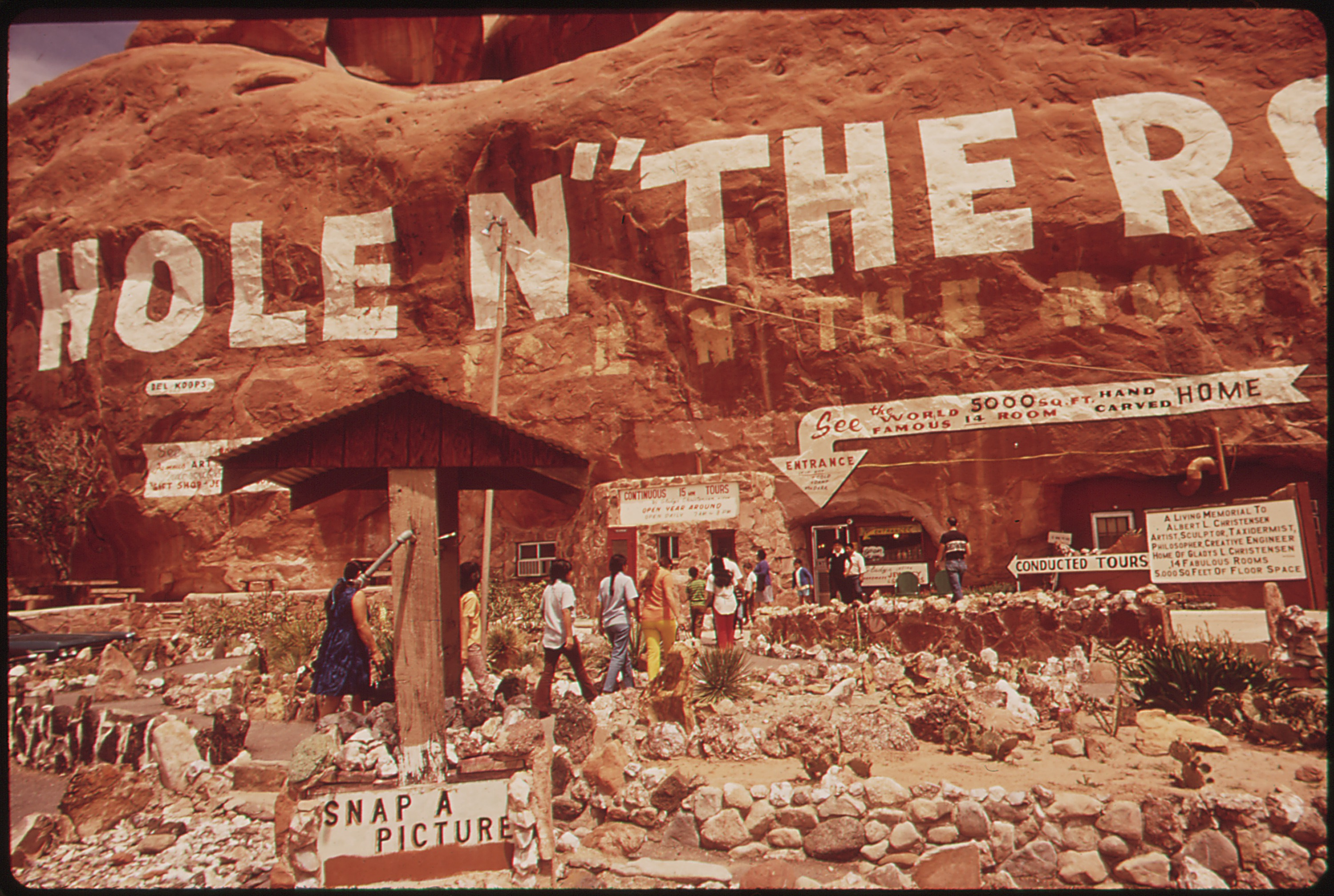
Entrance to Hole N" The Rock (1972)

The Christensen family created a homestead on 80 acres (32 ha) of land between Moab and Monticello in the early 20th century. Albert and his brother Leo Christensen hollowed out a cave in a sandstone cliff to provide shade and rough lodgings for cowboys pushing cattle through the area. In 1940 Albert began hand drilling and blasting to create a home for his family, working on the site for twelve years. The family moved into the home in 1952.

Albert and Leo opened the Hole N" the Rock Diner in 1945. The diner operated until 1955, when Albert had a heart attack. After Albert died in 1957, his wife Gladys had the large sign painted into the face of the rock above the home and opened a gift shop, selling her handmade rock jewelry. Gladys opened the site to tours before her death in 1974.

Gladys' son, Hub Davis, owned the site until 2000, when it was purchased by Wyndee and Erik Hansen. The Hansens left the house as it was when the Christensens lived there, but added additional gift shops and a petting zoo.

A small part of the 2014 movie Transformers: Age of Extinction was filmed at Hole N" The Rock.
