= Baghestan, Bandar Abbas =

Baghestan باغستان
- Village
- Location within Iran
- Coordinates: 27°42′37″N 55°53′59″E
- Country: Iran
- Province: Hormozgan
- County: Bandar Abbas
- Bakhsh: Fin
- Rural District: Fin

Population (2006)
  - Total: 64
- Time zone: UTC+3:30 (IRST)
  - Summer (DST): UTC+4:30 (IRDT)

Baghestan (Persian: باغستان, also Romanized as Bāghestān) is a village in Fin Rural District, Fin District, Bandar Abbas County, Hormozgan Province, Iran. At the 2006 census, its population was 64, in 16 families.
