= Mulla Alaul Maulk Tuni =

Iranian architect

Mulla Alaul Maulk Tuni (Persian: ملا علاءالملک تونی) was an Iranian architect. He was born in Ferdows (named "Toon" historically) in the 17th century.

He cooperated with Ali Mardan Khan in the construction of the Shalimar Gardens in Lahore in 1641 C.E.

He also designed and built the Fazelieh school in Mashhad from approximately 1650 to 1665.
