= Baghestan, Qazvin =

Baghestan باغستان
- Village
- Location within Iran
- Coordinates: 36°23′14″N 50°18′14″E
- Country: Iran
- Province: Qazvin
- County: Qazvin
- Bakhsh: Alamut-e Gharbi
- Rural District: Rudbar-e Mohammad-e Zamani

Population (2006)
  - Total: 57
- Time zone: UTC+3:30 (IRST)
  - Summer (DST): UTC+4:30 (IRDT)

Baghestan (Persian: باغستان, also Romanized as Bāghestān) is a village in Rudbar-e Mohammad-e Zamani Rural District, Alamut-e Gharbi District, Qazvin County, Qazvin Province, Iran. At the 2006 census, its population was 57, in 21 families.
