= Polond Desert =

Desert in Iran

Coordinates: 34°09′24″N 57°41′39″E

Polond Desert (Persian: کویر پلوند, romanized: Kavir e Polond, also Romanized as Plond Desert), also known as the Mozaffari Desert (کویر مظفری Kavir e Mozaffari), is a desert located 40 kilometers West of Ferdows, South Khorasan Province, Iran.

Polond Desert is located inside the Mozaffari Protected Area.

== Places to visit ==
Sandy hills and dunes adjacent to mountains form amazing landscapes. Among the unique natural attractions of the region, is a dune known as Cheetah's Tail (Persian: دم یوز, romanized: Dom e Youz) because its shape is like a Cheetah's tail.
