= Eslamiyeh =

City in South Khorasan province, Iran

Eslamiyeh Persian: اسلامیه
- City
- Location within Iran
- Coordinates: 34°02′35″N 58°13′12″E
- Country: Iran
- Province: South Khorasan
- County: Ferdows
- District: Eslamiyeh

Population (2016)
  - Total: 7,108
- Time zone: UTC+3:30 (IRST)

Eslamiyeh (Persian: اسلامیه) (Note: Also romanized as Eslāmīyeh and Islamiyeh; formerly Bāghestān-e Ferdows and Beheshtābād) is a city in, and the capital of, Eslamiyeh District of Ferdows County, South Khorasan province, Iran. The city is about 3 kilometres (1.9 mi) northeast of Ferdows.

== Demographics ==
=== Population ===
At the time of the 2006 National Census, the city's population was 5,167 in 1,515 households, when it was in the Central District. The following census in 2011 counted 6,084 people in 1,846 households. The 2016 census measured the population of the city as 7,108 people in 2,193 households.

In 2020, the city was separated from the district in the establishment of Eslamiyeh District.
