= Baghestan Rural District (Ferdows County) =

Rural district in South Khorasan province, Iran

Baghestan Rural District Persian: دهستان باغستان
- Rural District
- Location within Iran
- Coordinates: 34°04′N 58°20′E
- Country: Iran
- Province: South Khorasan
- County: Ferdows
- District: Eslamiyeh
- Established: 1987
- Capital: Baghestan-e Sofla

Population (2016)
  - Total: 5,438
- Time zone: UTC+3:30 (IRST)

Baghestan Rural District (Persian: دهستان باغستان) is in Eslamiyeh District of Ferdows County, South Khorasan province, Iran. Its capital is the village of Baghestan-e Sofla. The previous capital of the rural district was the village of Baghestan-e Olya, now the city of Baghestan.

== Demographics ==
=== Population ===
At the time of the 2006 National Census, the rural district's population (as a part of the Central District) was 5,395 in 1,861 households. There were 5,361 inhabitants in 1,903 households at the following census of 2011. The 2016 census measured the population of the rural district as 5,438 in 1,863 households. The most populous of its 58 villages was Baghestan-e Olya (now the city of Baghestan), with 2,704 people.

In 2020, the rural district was separated from the district in the establishment of Eslamiyeh District.

=== Other villages in the rural district ===
- Badamuk
- Bidesgan
- Damdari Rezania
- Fathabad
- Fereyduni
- Gastaj
- Mahvid
- Mehran Kushk
- Rahmatabad
- Sorond
- Torshizuk
