= Ferdows Hole-in-the-Rock =

Natural arch in Ferdows County, Iran

Coordinates: 34°08′45.7″N 57°50′24″E

Ferdows Hole-in-the-Rock (Persian: سنگ سوراخ فردوس, romanized: Sang-e Sourakh-e Ferdows) is a natural geological formation located 35 km (22 mi) west of Ferdows, South Khorasan province, Iran.

== Description ==
"Sang-e Sourakh" translates to "Hole Rock" in Persian. Ferdows Hole-in-the-Rock is an elliptical opening around 20 metres (66 ft) wide eroded in a Limestone hill.

== Gallery ==
Ferdows Hole-in-the-Rock
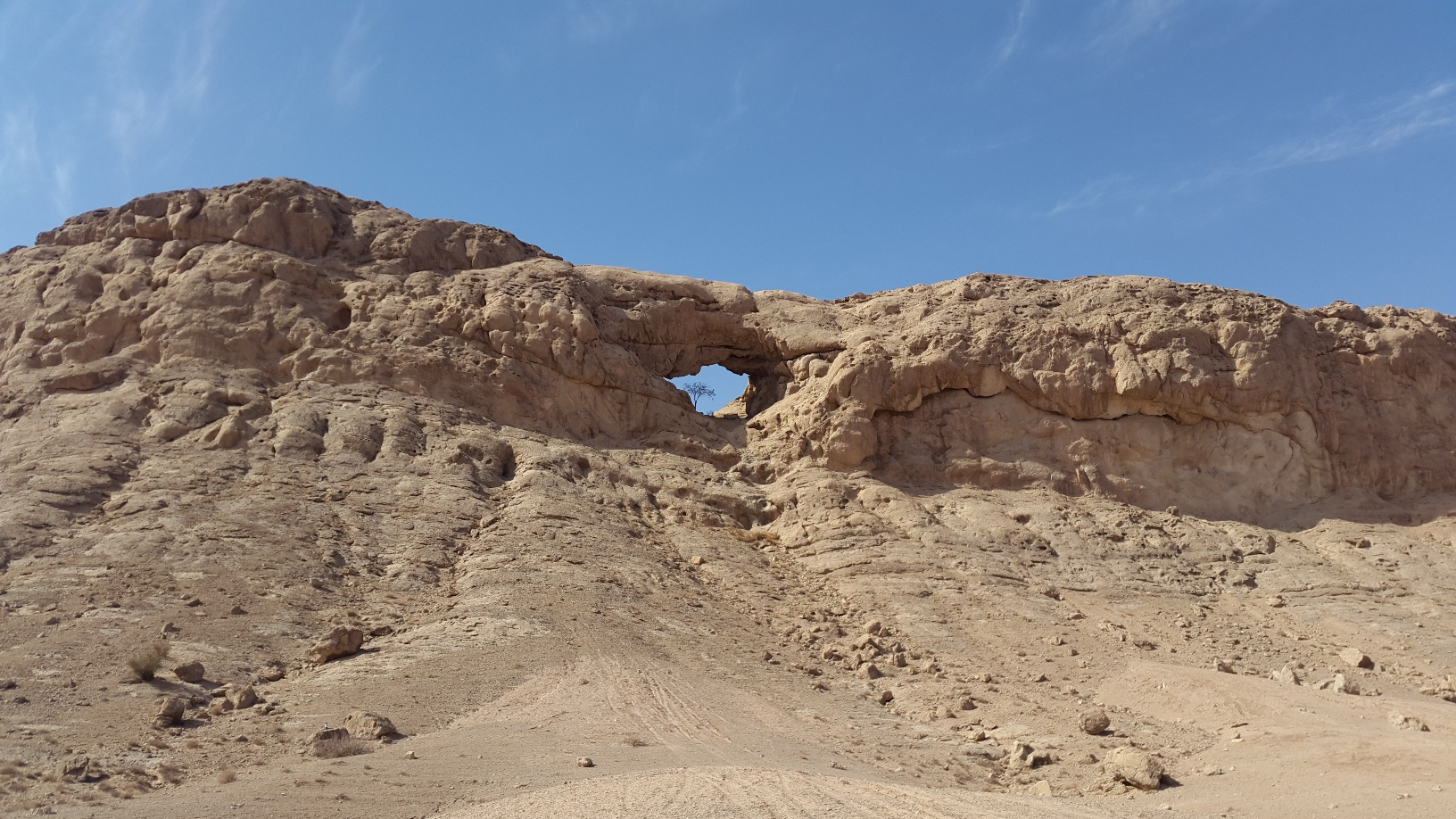
Ferdows Hole-in-the-Rock, located in Ferdows County.

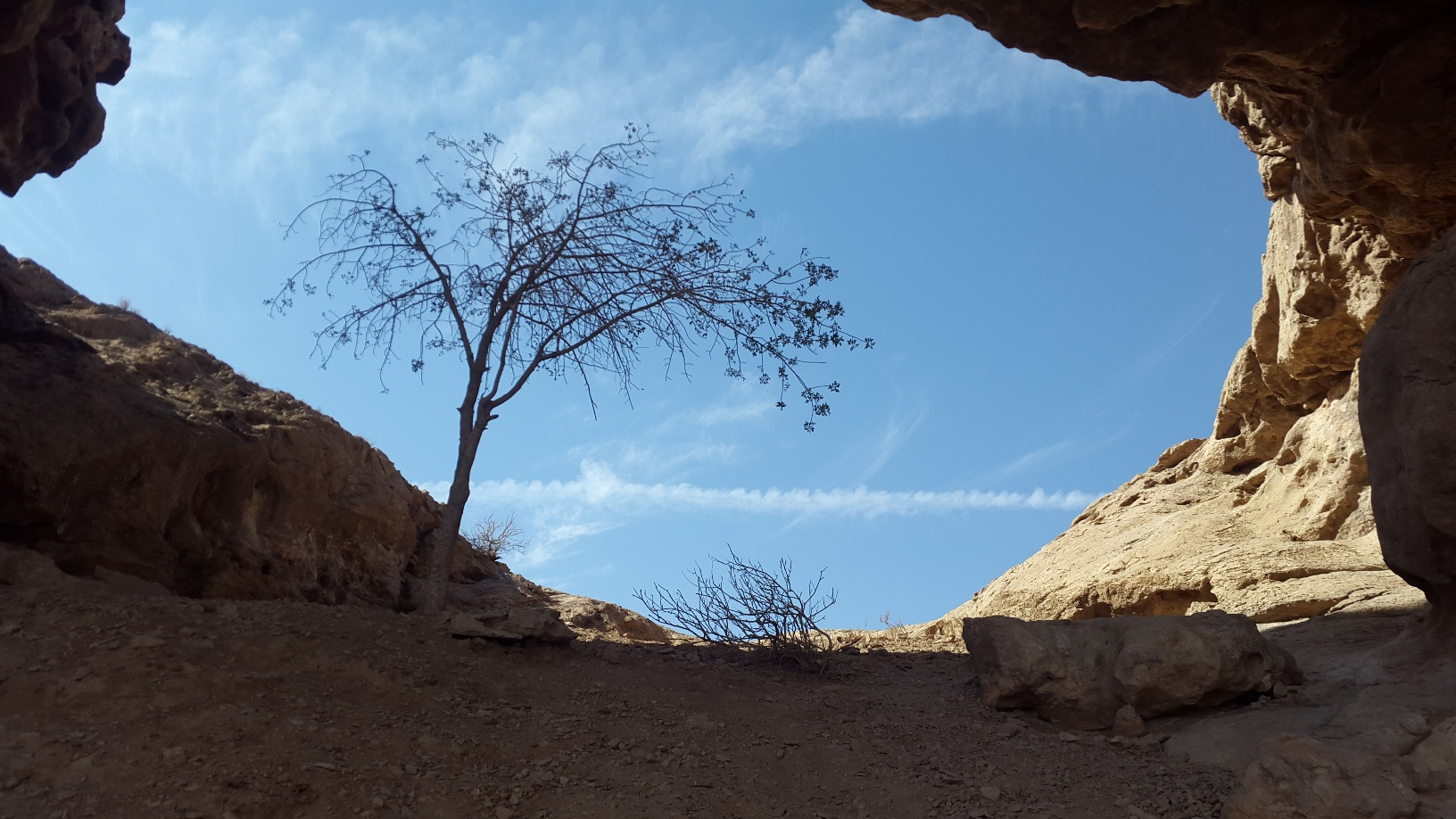
View from inside Ferdows Hole-in-the-Rock.

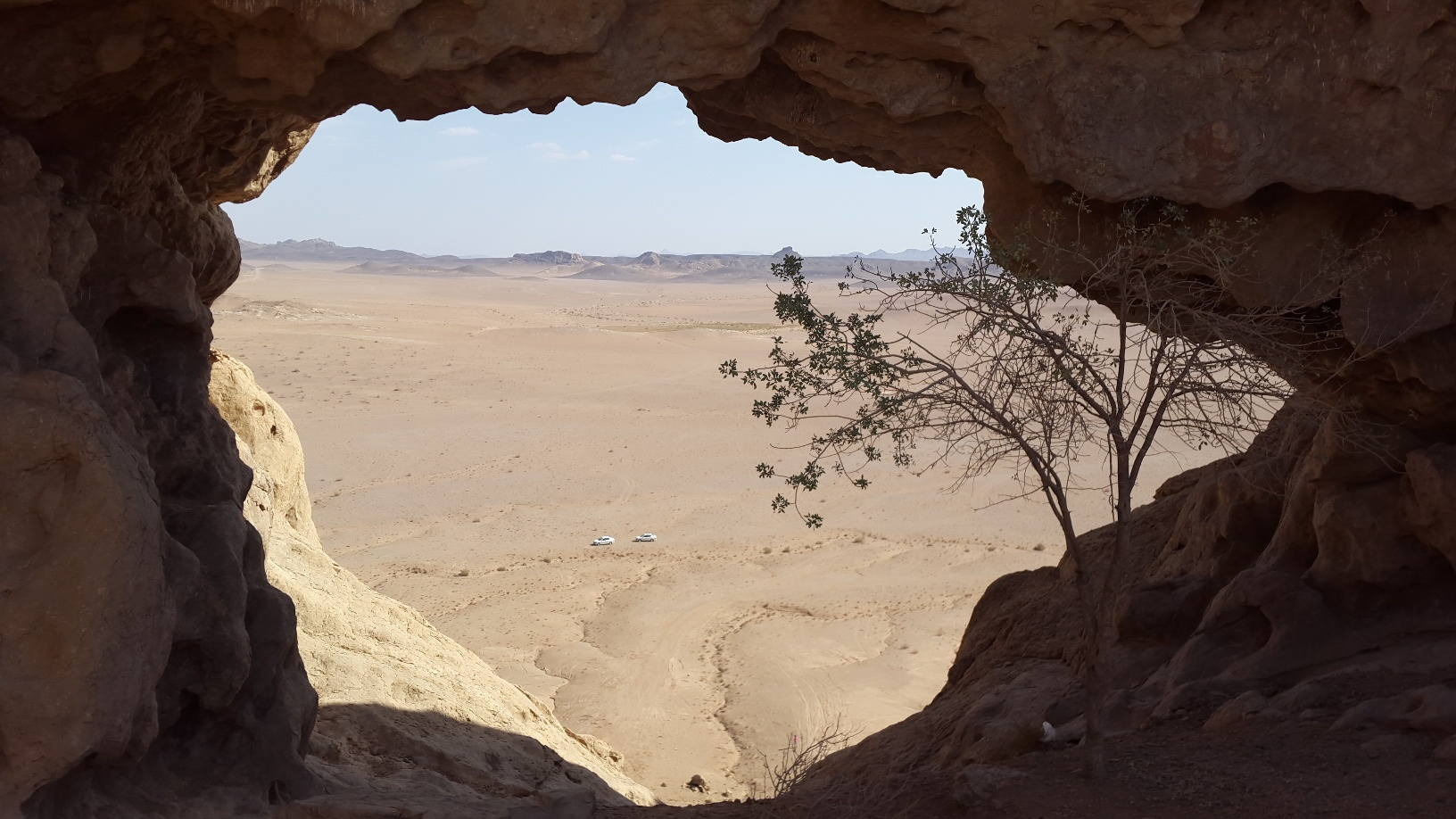
View from inside Ferdows Hole-in-the-Rock.
