= Ferdows =

City in South Khorasan province, Iran

Ferdows Persian: فردوس
- City
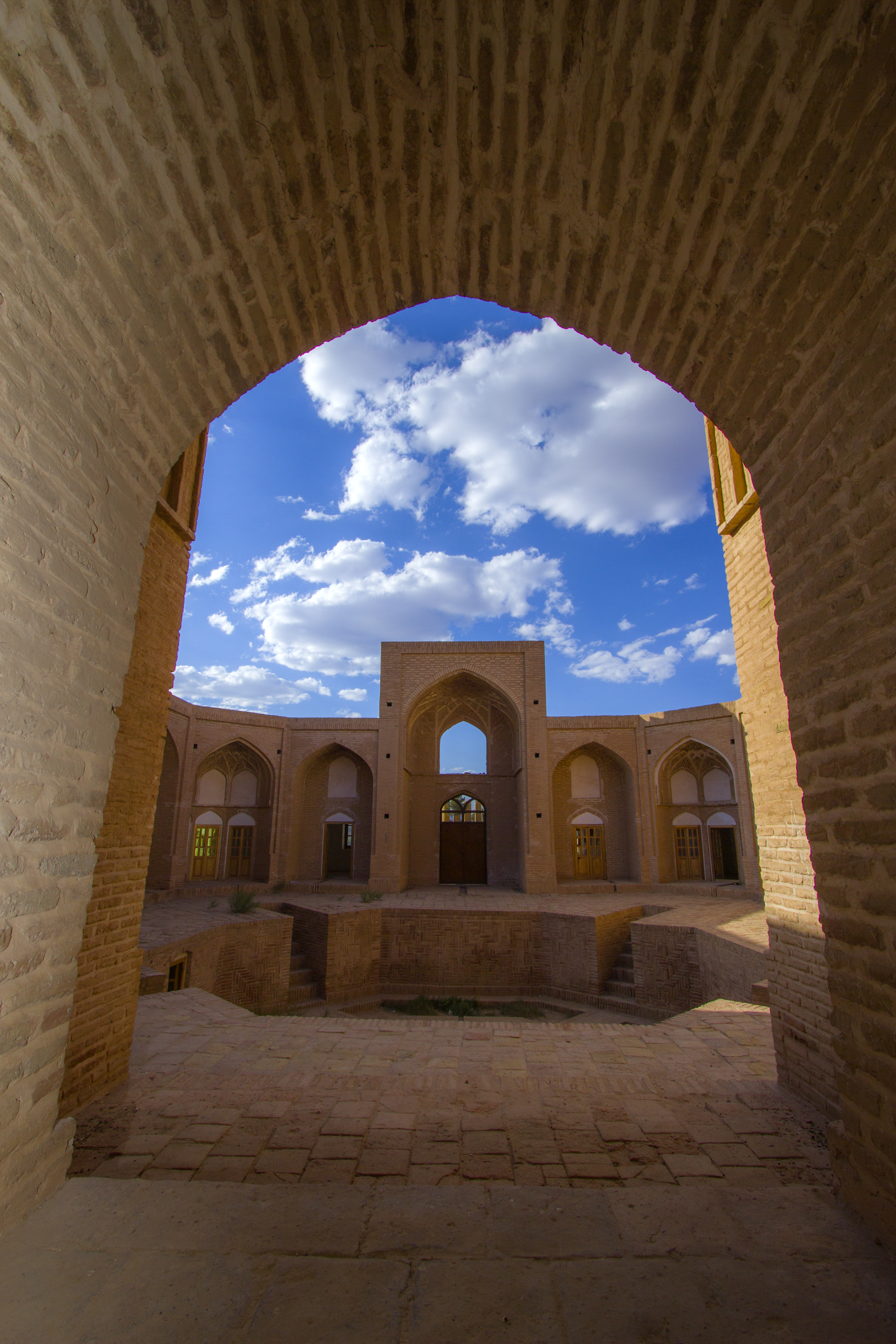
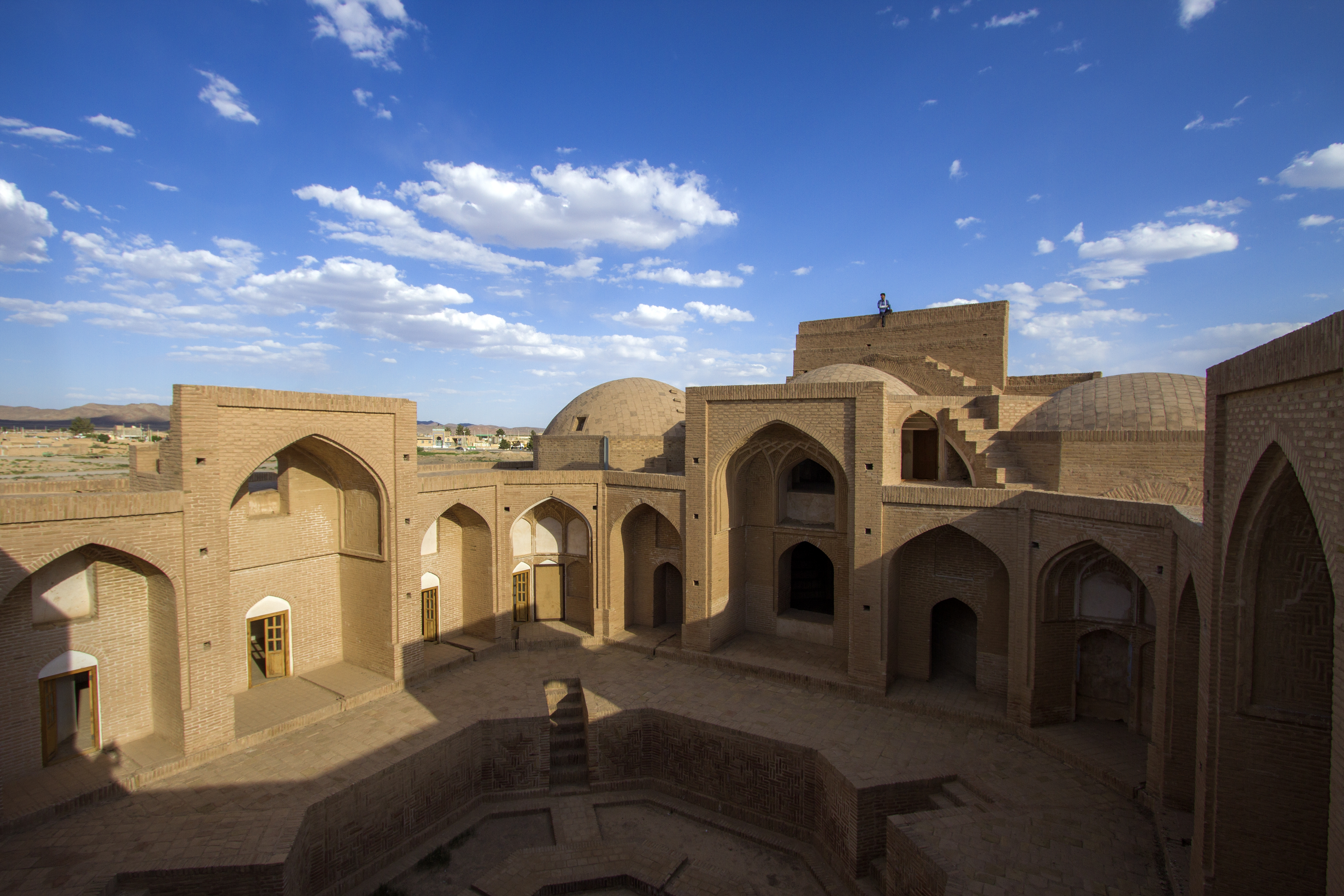
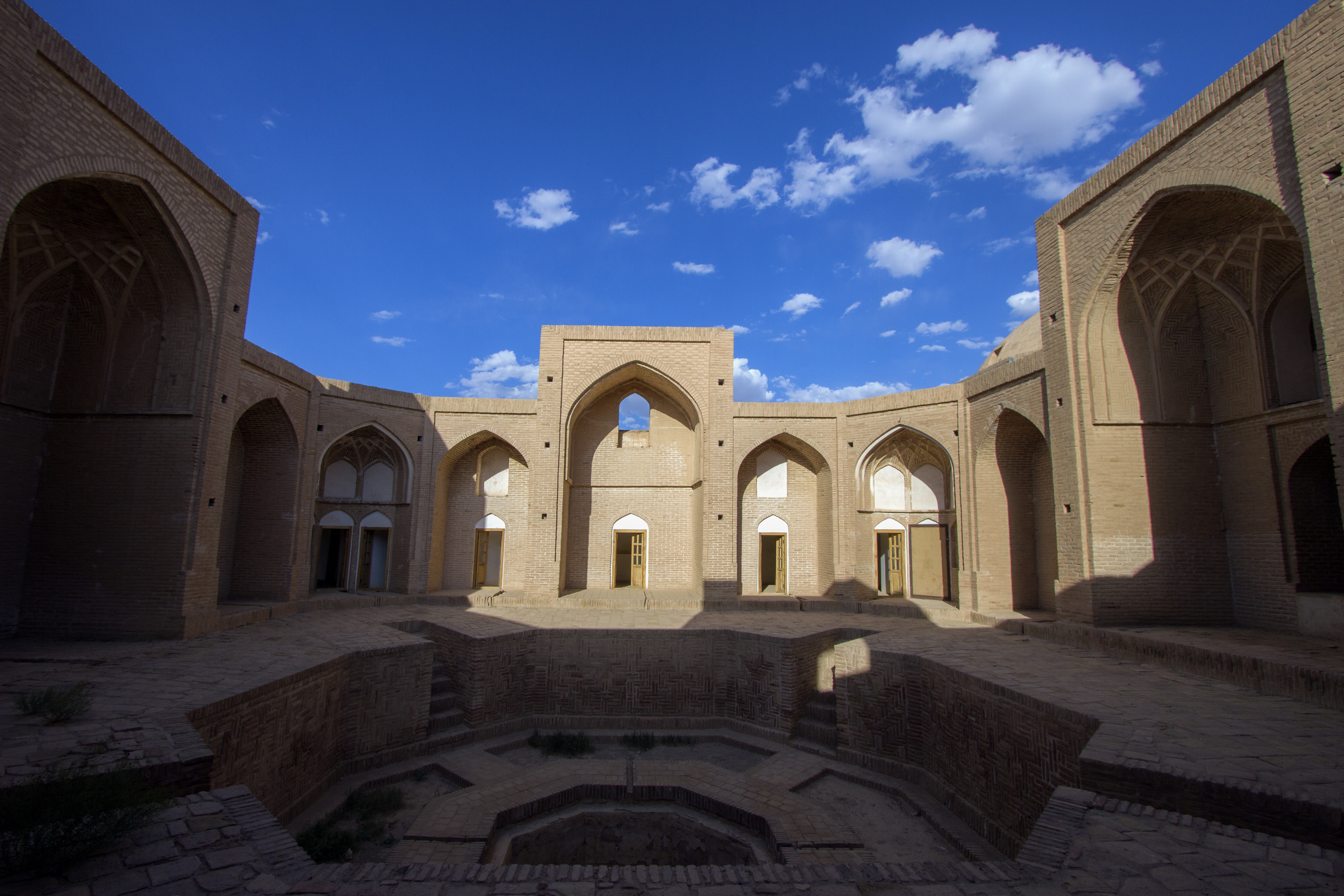

- Location within Iran
- Coordinates: 34°01′09″N 58°10′23″E
- Country: Iran
- Province: South Khorasan
- County: Ferdows
- District: Central
- Elevation: 1,293 m (4,242 ft)

Population (2016)
  - Total: 28,695
- Time zone: UTC+3:30 (IRST)
- Routes: Road 91
- Website: http://ferdows.ir

Ferdows (Persian: فردوس) (Note: Also romanized as Ferdous; also known as Ferdos and Firdaus; until 1929 Tūn, also romanized as Toon) is a city in the Central District of Ferdows County, South Khorasan province, Iran, serving as capital of both the county and the district. It is about 345 kilometres (214 mi) south of Mashhad and 200 km northwest of Birjand. Ferdows is on the main axis connecting Yazd, Kerman, Isfahan, Bushehr, Hormozgan and Fars provinces to Mashhad. Ferdows city is 1293 meters above sea level.

== History ==
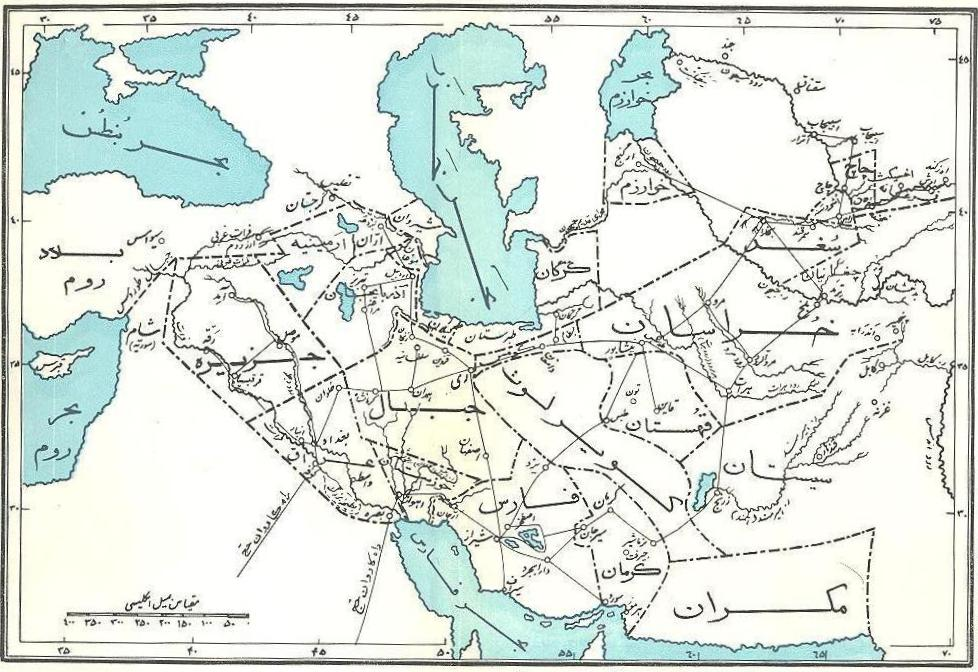
Map of Iran during the Abbasid Caliphate. Toon (Ferdows), Qaen and Tabas are the cities indicated in Quhistan (Nowadays South Khorasan Province).

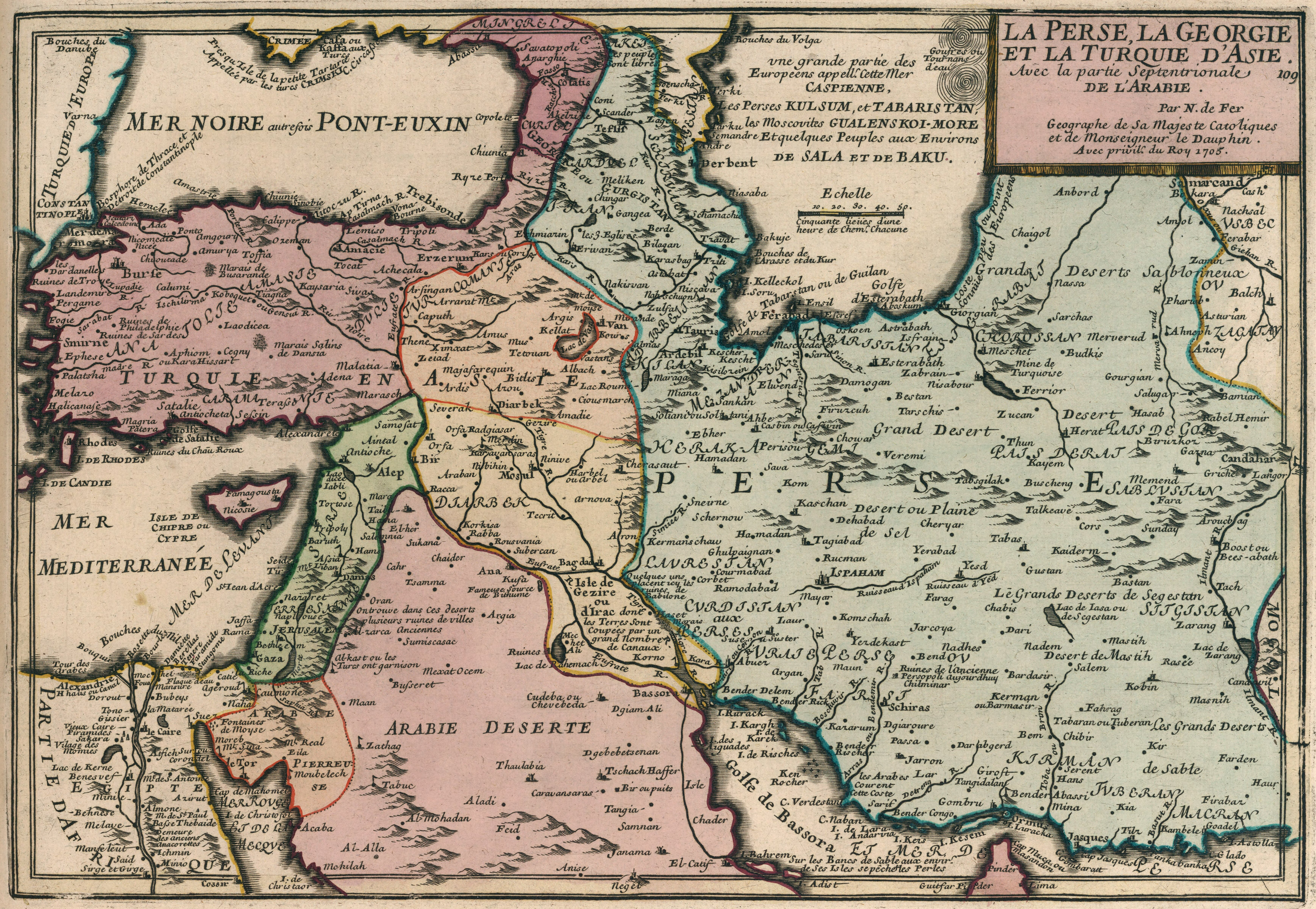
Ferdows's name on the map 1705 ("Thun")

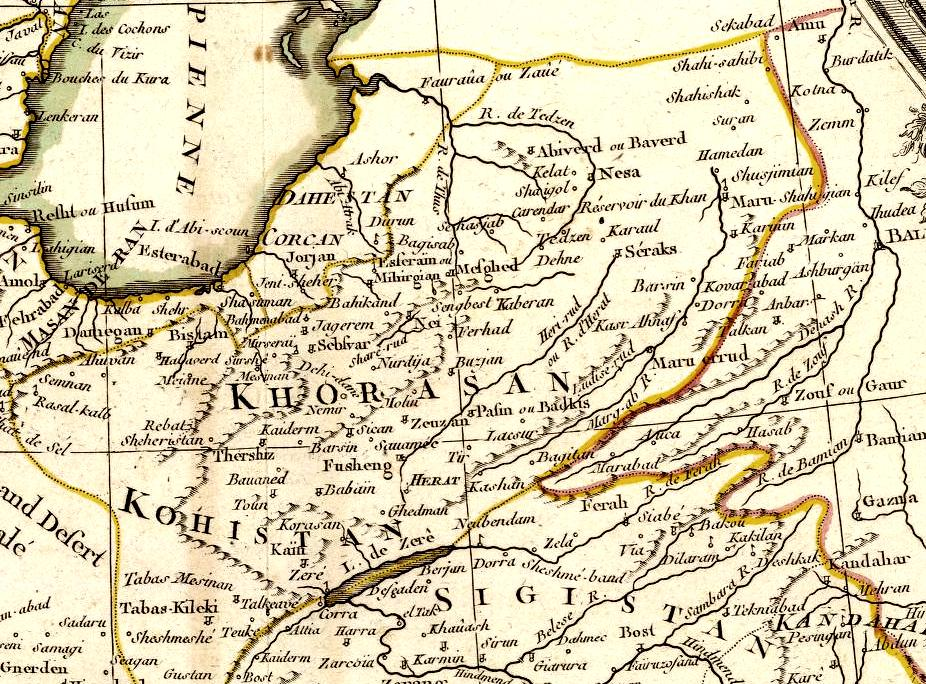
Ferdows's name on the map 1787 ("Toun")

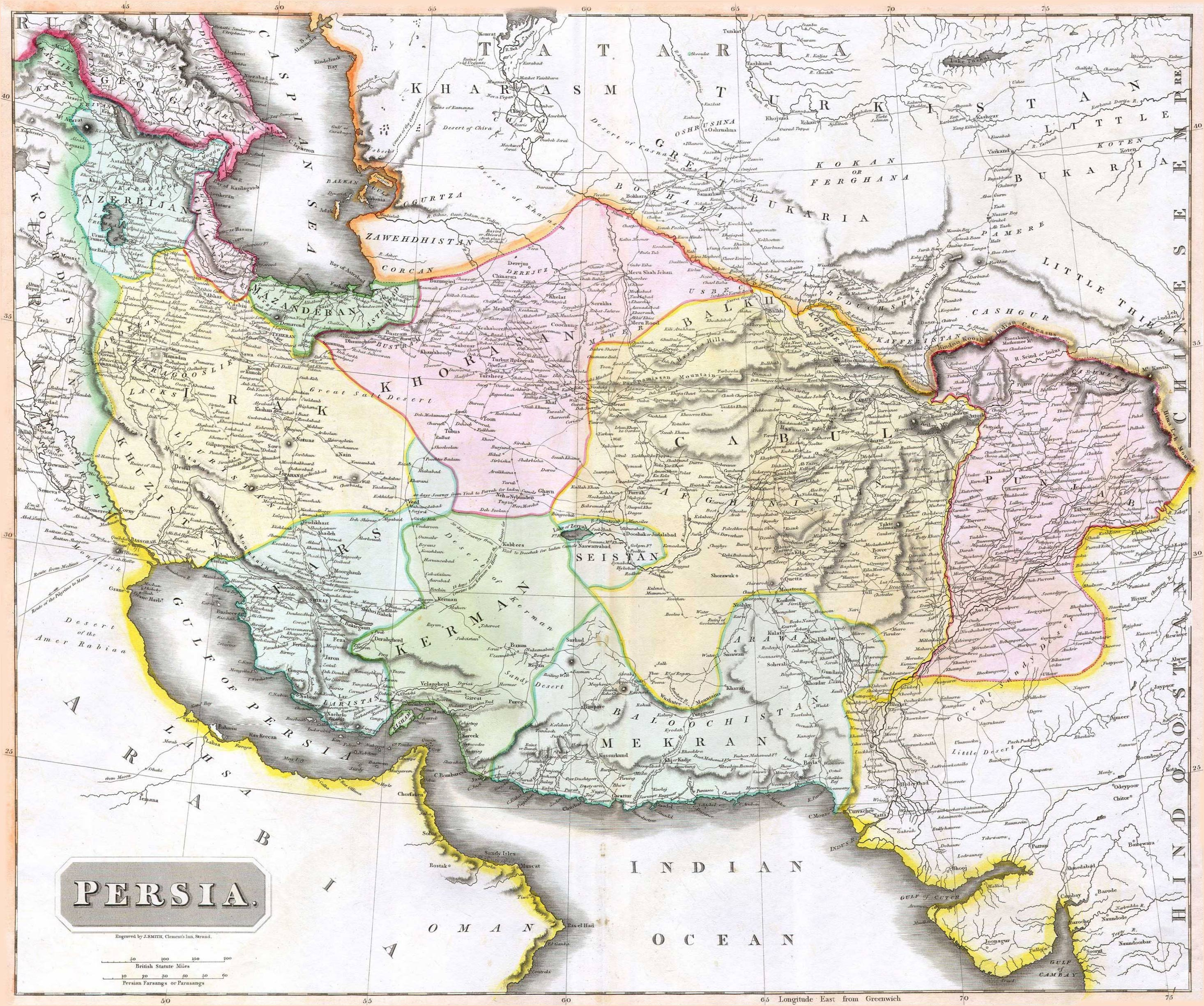
Ferdows's name on the map 1814 ("Toon")

Founded by the Medes, Ferdows is currently a city. It was a large and famous city in ancient days. There is an unproven theory that the town's name in ancient days was "Taban" (or shining; تابان in Persian). In the Islamic era it became known as Toon or Tūn, a name retained until 1929, when it was changed to Ferdows.

The first people to inhabit Ferdows were a group of Sagartians. Toon was a famous and thriving city both before and during the Islamic era. It was one of the most prominent cities of Quhistan, along with Qaen; Nasir Khusraw mentioned Toon as a large city in the 11th century. However, Toon was plundered and destroyed by the Mongols in 1239. Eventually, Toon recovered and regained its statues as one of Quhistan's major cities. Marco Polo mentioned the south Khorasan region as Toonoqaen, apparently in reference to the two largest cities, Toon and Qaen.

In early 1751 the town was captured by Ahmad Shah Durrani during his invasion of Khorasan under Shahrokh Shah.

Ferdows was still a famous and prosperous city in Khorasan at the beginning of the 20th century and the Municipality of Ferdows, originally formed in 1925 (under the name of Toon), was one of the first municipalities of Khorasan province. However, the city experienced significant decline following a devastating earthquake in 1968.

After Khorasan province was divided into three provinces, Ferdows County was initially a part of Razavi Khorasan province, but was incorporated within the borders of South Khorasan province in 2007.

== Demographics ==
=== Population ===
At the time of the 2006 National Census, the city's population was 23,405 in 6,538 households. The following census in 2011 counted 25,968 people in 7,316 households. The 2016 census measured the population of the city as 28,695 people in 8,749 households.

== Geography ==
=== Location ===
Ferdows is on the Plateau of Iran, between a desert region (mainly to the south and west) and a mountainous region (especially to the north and east). Most of villages around Ferdows are situated in the mountainous region to the north and northeast. The nearest town, Eslamieh, lies just 3 km northeast. The city lies on the main route from Kerman, Yazd, Bandar Abbas and other southern cities to Mashhad and hosts more than 6 million pilgrims annually on their way to Mashhad. It is also a nexus of several roads converging from different areas of Iran.

=== Climate ===
Ferdows has a cold desert climate (BWk) according to the Köppen climate classification. The climate is mild in the spring, hot in the summer, cool and rainy in autumn, and cold in the winter. Being located near deserts, the temperature difference between day and night, and also between summer and winter, is relatively high. The majority of precipitation occurs from mid-autumn to mid-spring. The hottest month is July (mean minimum temperature 21.8 °C, mean maximum temperature 36.6 °C) and the coldest is January (mean minimum temperature -1 °C, mean maximum temperature 10.3 °C)

Climate data for Ferdows (1991-2020)
Month	Jan	Feb	Mar	Apr	May	Jun	Jul	Aug	Sep	Oct	Nov	Dec	Year
Record high °C (°F)	20.7 (69.3)	27.2 (81.0)	33.8 (92.8)	35.2 (95.4)	39.6 (103.3)	43.2 (109.8)	43.6 (110.5)	43.6 (110.5)	38.9 (102.0)	35.2 (95.4)	29.0 (84.2)	25.2 (77.4)	43.6 (110.5)
Mean daily maximum °C (°F)	10.3 (50.5)	13.0 (55.4)	18.3 (64.9)	24.7 (76.5)	30.4 (86.7)	35.4 (95.7)	36.5 (97.7)	35.0 (95.0)	31.8 (89.2)	25.6 (78.1)	17.9 (64.2)	12.5 (54.5)	24.3 (75.7)
Daily mean °C (°F)	4.5 (40.1)	7.1 (44.8)	12.2 (54.0)	18.4 (65.1)	24.1 (75.4)	28.9 (84.0)	30.1 (86.2)	28.2 (82.8)	24.4 (75.9)	18.4 (65.1)	11.2 (52.2)	6.3 (43.3)	17.8 (64.0)
Mean daily minimum °C (°F)	−0.1 (31.8)	2.1 (35.8)	6.6 (43.9)	12.0 (53.6)	16.9 (62.4)	21.2 (70.2)	22.9 (73.2)	20.6 (69.1)	16.0 (60.8)	11.0 (51.8)	5.3 (41.5)	1.5 (34.7)	11.3 (52.3)
Record low °C (°F)	−20.6 (−5.1)	−12.6 (9.3)	−6.6 (20.1)	−0.9 (30.4)	5.9 (42.6)	13.2 (55.8)	12.4 (54.3)	10.0 (50.0)	5.5 (41.9)	−0.3 (31.5)	−8.8 (16.2)	−10.4 (13.3)	−20.6 (−5.1)
Average precipitation mm (inches)	26.0 (1.02)	24.7 (0.97)	29.4 (1.16)	18.7 (0.74)	6.8 (0.27)	0.6 (0.02)	0.0 (0.0)	0.2 (0.01)	0.0 (0.0)	2.6 (0.10)	9.9 (0.39)	17.0 (0.67)	135.9 (5.35)
Average precipitation days (≥ 1.0 mm)	4.1	4.3	4.6	3.5	1.6	0.2	0.0	0.0	0.0	0.7	2.0	3.2	24.2
Average relative humidity (%)	56	50	43	35	27	20	20	20	21	28	42	53	34.6
Average dew point °C (°F)	−4.1 (24.6)	−3.5 (25.7)	−1.1 (30.0)	1.8 (35.2)	2.9 (37.2)	3.3 (37.9)	4.4 (39.9)	2.9 (37.2)	0.4 (32.7)	−1.0 (30.2)	−2.0 (28.4)	−3.2 (26.2)	0.1 (32.1)
Mean monthly sunshine hours	200	200	230	263	319	357	379	369	326	294	231	205	3,373
Source: NOAA

Climate data for Ferdows, Iran
Month	Jan	Feb	Mar	Apr	May	Jun	Jul	Aug	Sep	Oct	Nov	Dec	Year
Mean daily maximum °C (°F)	10.3 (50.5)	12.7 (54.9)	17.3 (63.1)	24.7 (76.5)	30.3 (86.5)	35.7 (96.3)	36.6 (97.9)	35.2 (95.4)	32.3 (90.1)	25.8 (78.4)	18.9 (66.0)	12.9 (55.2)	24.4 (75.9)
Daily mean °C (°F)	5.2 (41.4)	7.5 (45.5)	12.1 (53.8)	19.3 (66.7)	24.9 (76.8)	30.3 (86.5)	31.4 (88.5)	29.5 (85.1)	25.8 (78.4)	19.3 (66.7)	12.7 (54.9)	7.3 (45.1)	18.8 (65.8)
Mean daily minimum °C (°F)	−1.0 (30.2)	0.7 (33.3)	4.7 (40.5)	10.5 (50.9)	14.9 (58.8)	19.7 (67.5)	21.8 (71.2)	19.2 (66.6)	14.5 (58.1)	9.3 (48.7)	4.3 (39.7)	0.9 (33.6)	10.0 (50.0)
Average precipitation mm (inches)	26.0 (1.02)	28.0 (1.10)	34.6 (1.36)	18.2 (0.72)	5.1 (0.20)	0.4 (0.02)	0.1 (0.00)	0.4 (0.02)	0.1 (0.00)	2.4 (0.09)	6.5 (0.26)	26.0 (1.02)	147.8 (5.82)
Average precipitation days (≥ 0.01 mm)	7.0	6.9	8.3	5.2	2.5	0.3	0.1	0.1	0.1	1.2	2.6	6.1	40.4
Average relative humidity (%)	60	53	45	36	27	21	21	22	22	29	40	56	36
Average dew point °C (°F)	−3.5 (25.7)	−2.9 (26.8)	−0.9 (30.4)	1.9 (35.4)	3.0 (37.4)	4.2 (39.6)	5.1 (41.2)	3.7 (38.7)	0.9 (33.6)	−0.6 (30.9)	−2.2 (28.0)	−2.4 (27.7)	0.5 (32.9)
Mean monthly sunshine hours	184	198	223	261	321	358	370	366	322	279	230	185	3,297
Source: Iran Meteorological Organization (IRIMO)

== Agriculture ==
Ferdows is famous for its high quality Saffron and pomegranate.

== Main sights ==
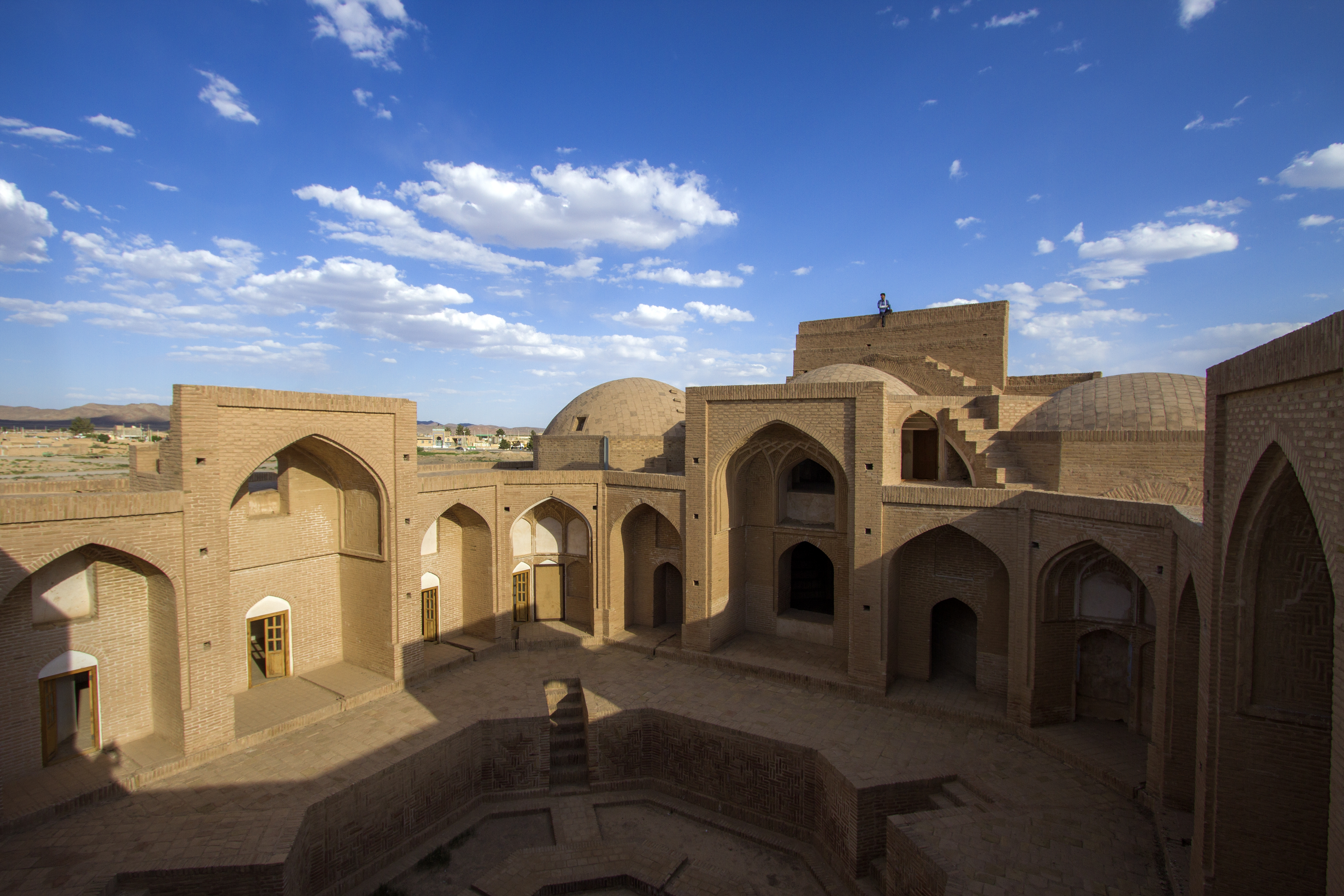
The Safavid era Religious School of Ferdows

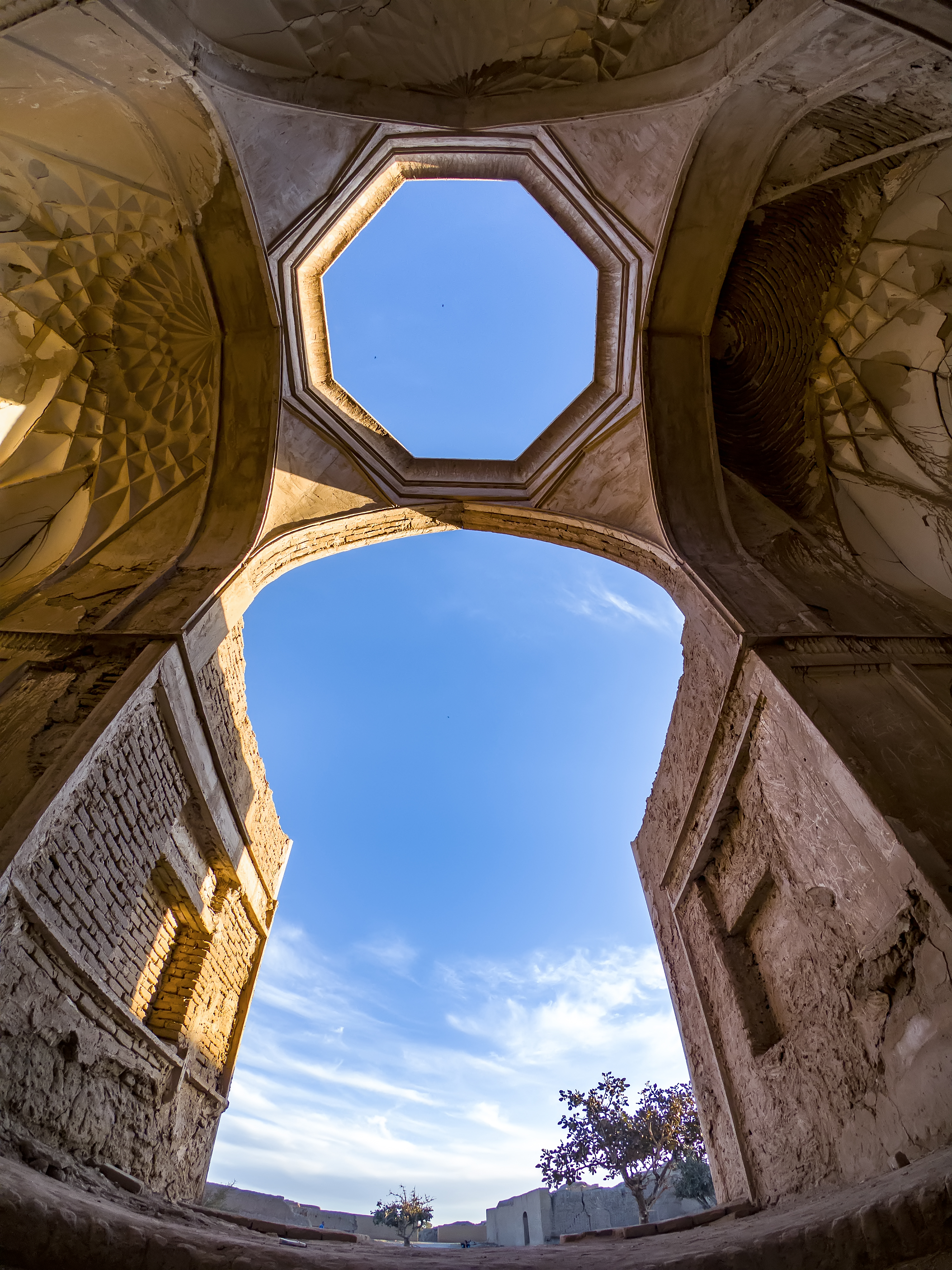
A view of a historic Safavid era house in Ferdows

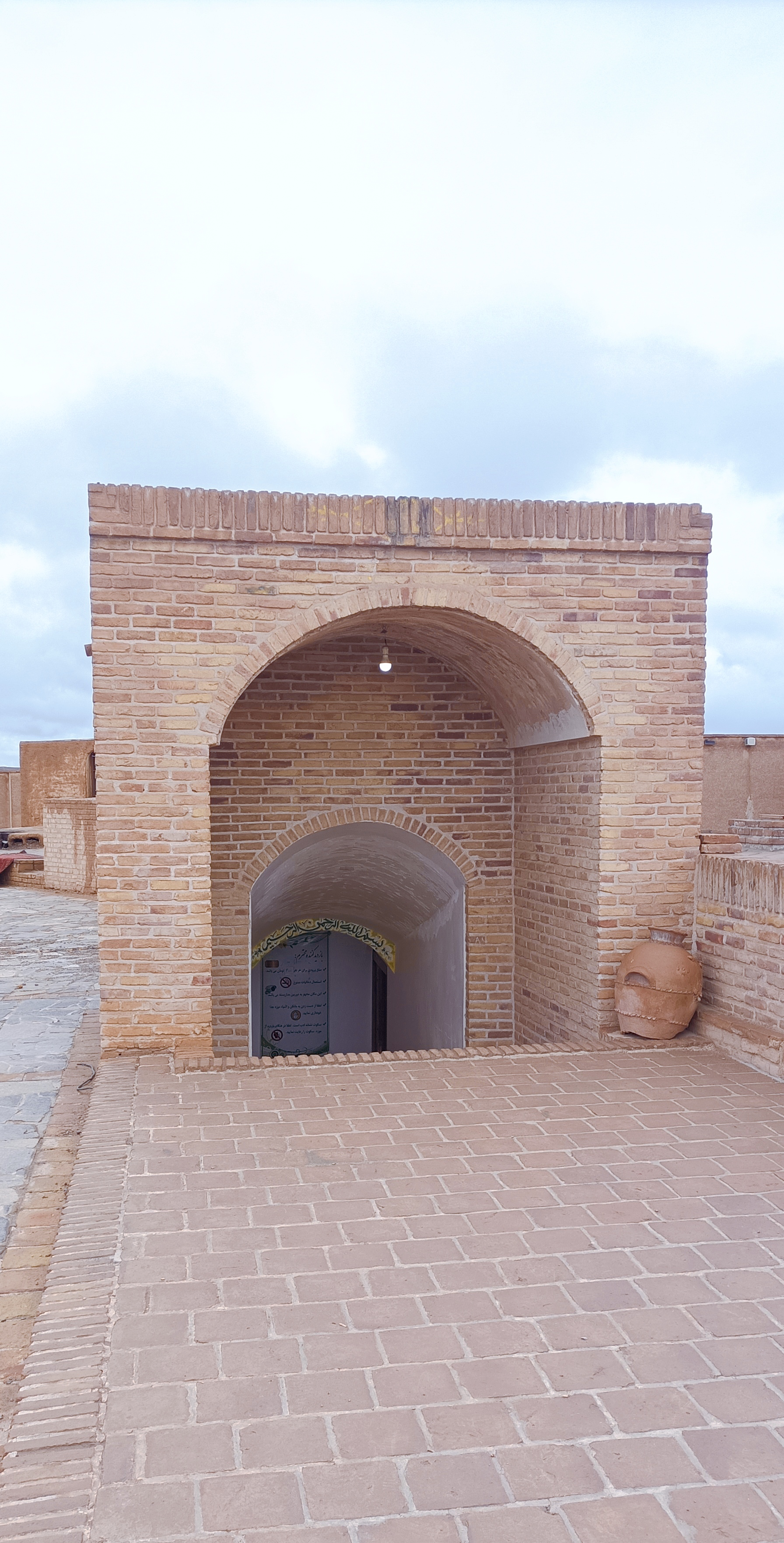
The entrance to the historical museum

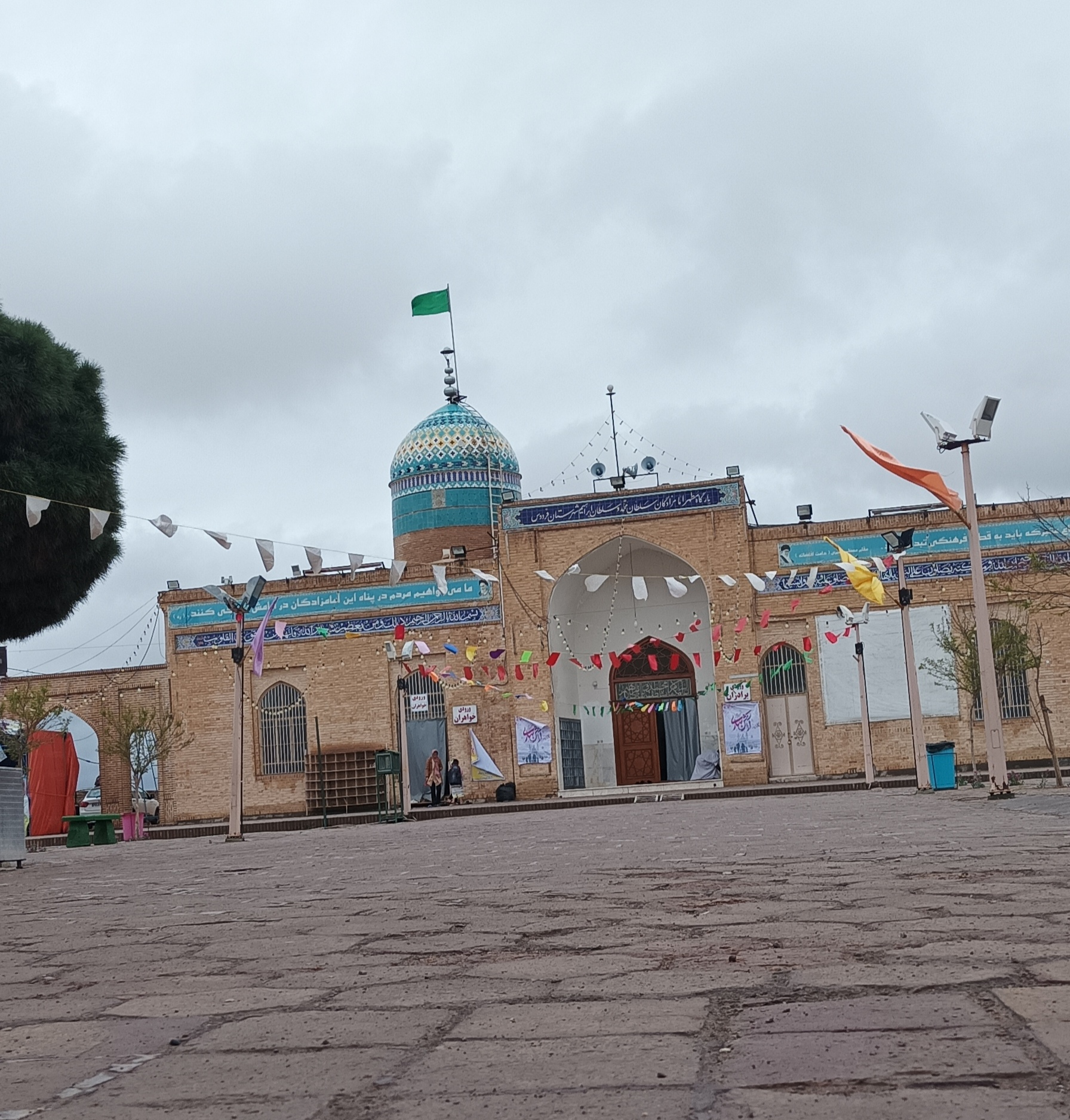
Historic tomb in Ferdows

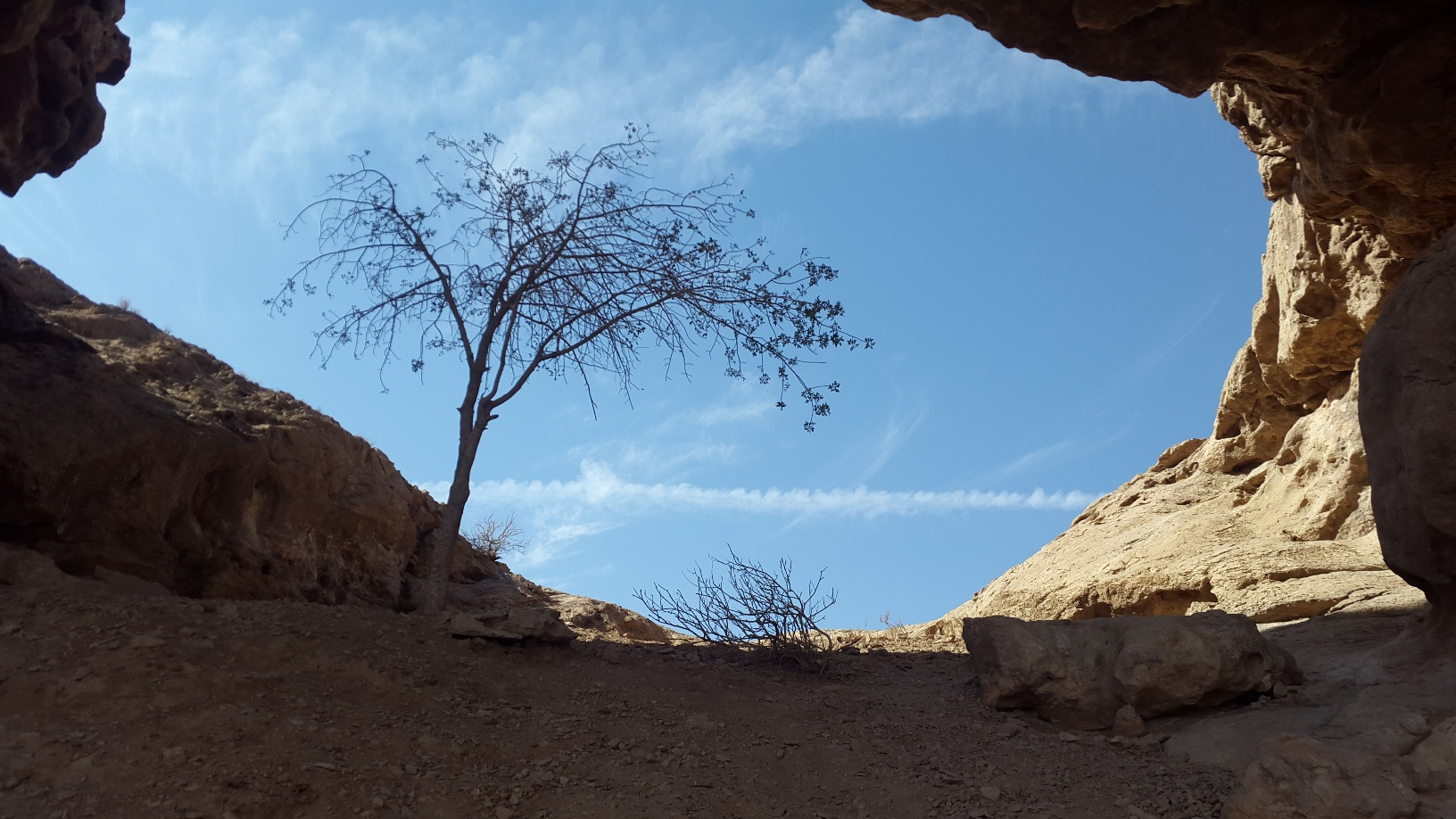
Ferdows Hole-in-the-Rock

Major visitor attractions of Ferdows are:

- Ferdows Hot Mineral Spring: one of the most important attractions of Ferdows for Iranian and International tourists
- Ferdows Religious School (belonged to the Safavid dynasty)
- Ferdows Congregation Mosque (Jame' Mosque of Ferdows) (belonged to the Seljuk dynasty)
- Ferdows Hole-in-the-Rock, a natural geological formation
- Polond Desert, a beautiful desert located 40 kilometers West of Ferdows
- Ferdows Museum

=== Emad Nezam Tourism Complex ===
It is located in the city of Ferdows, launched by entrepreneur in Iran, Dr. Mohammad Reza Amirhassankhani. He believes in the district of Ferdows with beautiful sightseeing and tourist destinations, investing his money there for many years. The large Complex includes a variety of subsectors:

- Emad Nezam Traditional Hotel
- Emad Nezam Scientific, cultural and recreational collection affiliated with Mofid educational complex
- Emad Nezam Sports Club
- Emad Nezam Football Academy
- Mofid Educational Complex
- Polond Desert Tourism Camp

== Education and culture ==
Education and culture Ferdows currently has several higher education centers:

- Islamic Azad University, Ferdows
- Ferdows and Qaen Medical Schools
- Ferdows Institute of Higher Education
- Ferdows Faculty of Engineering

== Notable people ==
- Badiozzaman Forouzanfar
- Mohammad Jafar Yahaghi
- Mulla Alaul Maulk Tuni
- Alireza Danesh Sokhanvar

== See also ==
- 1968 Dasht-e Bayaz and Ferdows earthquakes
- AH78
- Road 91 (Iran)
- Media related to Ferdows at Wikimedia Commons
