= Eslamiyeh District (Ferdows County) =

District in South Khorasan province, Iran

Eslamiyeh District Persian: بخش اسلامیه
- District
- Location within Iran
- Coordinates: 34°07′N 58°12′E
- Country: Iran
- Province: South Khorasan
- County: Ferdows
- Established: 2020
- Capital: Eslamiyeh
- Time zone: UTC+3:30 (IRST)

Eslamiyeh District (Persian: بخش اسلامیه) is in Ferdows County, South Khorasan province, Iran. Its capital is the city of Eslamiyeh, whose population at the time of the 2016 National Census was 7,108 in 2,193 households.

== History ==
In 2020, Baghestan and Borun Rural Districts, and the city of Eslamiyeh, were separated from the Central District in the formation of Eslamiyeh District. At the same time, the village of Baghestan-e Olya was converted to a city and renamed Baghestan.

== Demographics ==
=== Administrative divisions ===
Eslamiyeh District
Administrative Divisions
Baghestan RD
Borun RD
Baghestan (city) (Note: Became a city after the 2016 census)
Eslamiyeh (city)
RD = Rural District
