= Central District (Ferdows County) =

District in South Khorasan province, Iran

Central District (Ferdows County) Persian: بخش مرکزی شهرستان فردوس
- District
- Location within Iran
- Coordinates: 33°51′N 57°53′E
- Country: Iran
- Province: South Khorasan
- County: Ferdows
- Capital: Ferdows

Population (2016)
  - Total: 45,523
- Time zone: UTC+3:30 (IRST)

The Central District of Ferdows County (Persian: بخش مرکزی شهرستان فردوس) is in South Khorasan province, Iran. Its capital is the city of Ferdows.

== History ==
In 2020, Baghestan and Borun Rural Districts, and the city of Eslamiyeh, were separated from the district in the formation of Eslamiyeh District.

== Demographics ==
=== Population ===
At the time of the 2006 National Census, the district's population was 38,301 in 11,299 households. The following census in 2011 counted 41,626 people in 12,482 households. The 2016 census measured the population of the district as 45,523 inhabitants in 14,302 households.

=== Administrative divisions ===
Central District (Ferdows County) Population
| Administrative Divisions | 2006 | 2011 | 2016 |
|---|---|---|---|
| Baghestan Rural District (Note: Transferred to Eslamiyeh District after the 2016 census) | 5,395 | 5,361 | 5,438 |
| Borun Rural District | 2,048 | 1,835 | 1,721 |
| Howmeh Rural District | 2,286 | 2,378 | 2,561 |
| Eslamiyeh (city) | 5,167 | 6,084 | 7,108 |
| Ferdows (city) | 23,405 | 25,968 | 28,695 |
| Total | 38,301 | 41,626 | 45,523 |
RD = Rural District
