= Ferdows County =

County in South Khorasan province, Iran

Ferdows County Persian: شهرستان فردوس
- County
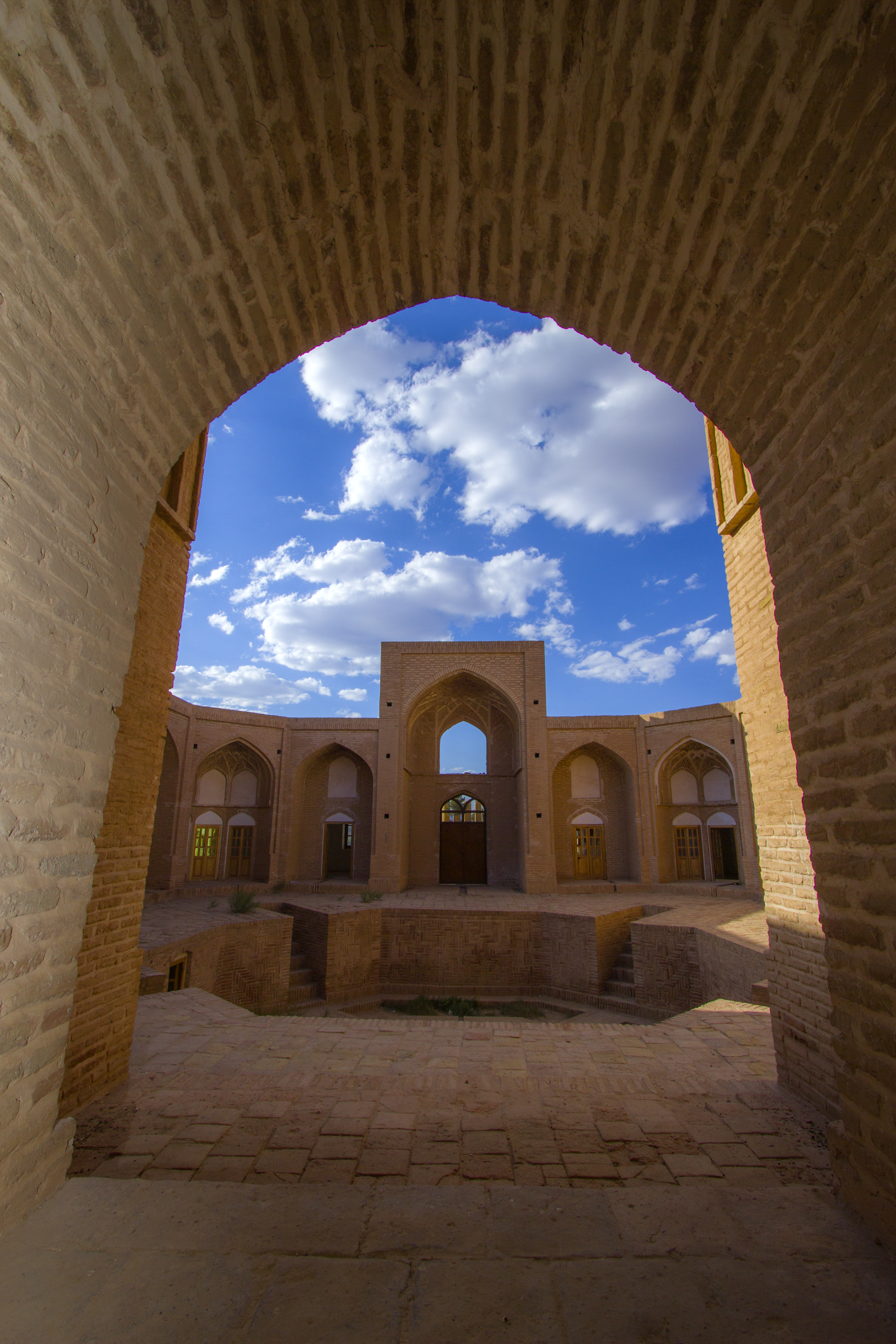
- Madraseh-ye Olya-e Ferdows

- Location of Ferdows County in South Khorasan province (top, pink)

- Location of South Khorasan province in Iran
- Coordinates: 33°51′N 58°01′E
- Country: Iran
- Province: South Khorasan
- Capital: Ferdows
- Districts: Central, Eslamiyeh

Population (2016)
  - Total: 45,523
- Time zone: UTC+3:30 (IRST)

Ferdows County (Persian: شهرستان فردوس) is in South Khorasan province, Iran. Its capital is the city of Ferdows.

== History ==
Situated in the north of the province, Ferdows County, which was formed in 1944, originally included a large area (more than 78,000 km^{2}), but its subdivisions have gradually become independent and the area now encompasses four counties (Ferdows, Tabas, Sarayan, and Boshruyeh Counties). After dividing the former Khorasan province into three provinces, Ferdows County was initially a part of Razavi Khorasan province, but was incorporated within the borders of South Khorasan province in 2007.

In 2008, Boshruyeh District was separated from the county in the establishment of Boshruyeh County. In 2020, Baghestan and Borun Rural Districts, and the city of Eslamiyeh, were separated from the Central District in the formation of Eslamiyeh District. At the same time, the village of Baghestan-e Olya was converted to a city and renamed Baghestan.

== Demographics ==
=== Population ===
At the time of the 2006 National Census, the county's population was 61,346 in 17,539 households. The following census in 2011 counted 41,626 people in 12,440 households. The 2016 census measured the population of the county as 45,523 in 14,302 households.

=== Administrative divisions ===
Ferdows County's population history and administrative structure over three consecutive censuses are shown in the following table.

Ferdows County Population
| Administrative Divisions | 2006 | 2011 | 2016 |
|---|---|---|---|
| Central District | 38,301 | 41,626 | 45,523 |
| Baghestan RD | 5,395 | 5,361 | 5,438 |
| Borun RD | 2,048 | 1,835 | 1,721 |
| Howmeh RD | 2,286 | 2,378 | 2,561 |
| Eslamiyeh (city) | 5,167 | 6,084 | 7,108 |
| Ferdows (city) | 23,405 | 25,968 | 28,695 |
| Boshruyeh District (Note: Transferred to Boshruyeh County) | 23,045 | | |
| Ali Jamal RD | 3,612 | | |
| Eresk RD | 3,226 | | |
| Raqqeh RD | 2,429 | | |
| Boshruyeh (city) | 13,778 | | |
| Eslamiyeh District (Note: Established after the 2016 census) | | | |
| Baghestan RD | | | |
| Borun RD | | | |
| Baghestan (city) (Note: Became a city after the 2016 census) | | | |
| Eslamiyeh (city) | | | |
| Total | 61,346 | 41,626 | 45,523 |
RD = Rural District

== Geography ==
Ferdows County borders Gonabad County and Bajestan County to the north, Gonabad County and Sarayan County to the east, Boshruyeh County to the west and south, and Tabas County to the south.

== Agriculture ==
Ferdows is famous for its high quality saffron and pomegranate.

== Visitor attractions ==
- Ferdows Hot Mineral Spring
- Ferdows Hole-in-the-Rock
- Polond Desert
- Ferdows Religious School (dating to Safavid dynasty)
- Ferdows Congregation Mosque (Jame' Mosque of Ferdows) (dating to Seljuk dynasty)

== See also ==
Media related to Ferdows County at Wikimedia Commons
