= Baghak =

Baghak may refer to:

- Baghak, Hormozgan, Iran
- Baghak, Kerman, Iran
- Baghak, Qom, Iran
- Bagh-e Yek or Baghak, Qom, Iran
- Baghak, Razavi Khorasan, Iran
- Baghak-e Sofla, Razavi Khorasan Province, Iran
- Baghak, Khash, Sistan and Baluchestan Province, Iran
- Baghak, Tehran, Iran
- Baghak Rural District, in Bushehr Province, Iran
- Baghak, Afghanistan, a village near the Shakari valley in Bamyan, Afghanistan

== See also ==
- Battle of Baghak, a 2012 battle in Afghanistan
