= Zohan (disambiguation) =

Zohan (Persian: زهان) is a city in South Khorasan Province, Iran.

Zohan may also refer to:

- Zohan, Kerman, a village in Kerman Province, Iran
- Zahan Kapoor, an Indian actor and theatre personality
- Zohan, Razavi Khorasan, a village in Razavi Khorasan Province, Iran
- Zohan, alternate name of Baghestan-e Zohan, a village in South Khorasan Province, Iran
- Zohan District, an administrative subdivision of South Khorasan Province, Iran
- Zohan Rural District, an administrative subdivision of South Khorasan Province, Iran
- You Don't Mess with the Zohan, a film
