= Kalat-e Malek =

Kalat-e Malek كلات مالك
- Village
- Location within Iran
- Coordinates: 27°12′35″N 58°20′47″E
- Country: Iran
- Province: Kerman
- County: Qaleh Ganj
- Bakhsh: Chah Dadkhoda
- Rural District: Chah Dadkhoda

Population (2006)
  - Total: 1,057
- Time zone: UTC+3:30 (IRST)
  - Summer (DST): UTC+4:30 (IRDT)

Kalat-e Malek (Persian: كلات مالك, also Romanized as Kalāt-e Mālek) is a village in Chah Dadkhoda Rural District, Chah Dadkhoda District, Qaleh Ganj County, Kerman Province, Iran. At the 2006 census, its population was 1,057, in 221 families.
