= Zamin Mohammad =

Zamin Mohammad زمين محمد
- village
- Interactive map of Zamin Mohammad
- Coordinates: 27°1′N 58°35′E
- Country: Iran
- Province: Kerman
- County: Qaleh Ganj
- Bakhsh: Chah Dadkhoda
- Rural District: Rameshk

Population (2006)
  - Total: 42
- Time zone: UTC+3:30 (IRST)
  - Summer (DST): UTC+4:30 (IRDT)

Zamin Mohammad (Persian: زمين محمد, also Romanized as Zamīn Moḩammad) is a village in Rameshk Rural District, Chah Dadkhoda District, Qaleh Ganj County, Kerman Province, Iran. At the 2006 census, its population was 42, in 9 families.
