= Posht-e Geru =

Posht-e Geru پشت گرو
- Village
- Location within Iran
- Coordinates: 26°58′22″N 58°07′07″E
- Country: Iran
- Province: Kerman
- County: Qaleh Ganj
- Bakhsh: Chah Dadkhoda
- Rural District: Marz

Population (2006)
  - Total: 38
- Time zone: UTC+3:30 (IRST)
  - Summer (DST): UTC+4:30 (IRDT)

Posht-e Geru (Persian: پشت گرو, also Romanized as Posht-e Gerū) is a village in Marz Rural District, Chah Dadkhoda District, Qaleh Ganj County, Kerman Province, Iran. At the 2006 census, its population was 38, in 10 families.
