= Chah Dadkhoda =

Chah Dadkhoda or Chah-e Dad Khoda (Persian: چاه دادخدا) may refer to:

- Chah Dadkhoda, Kerman, a city in Kerman province
- Chah Dadkhoda District, Kerman province
- Chah Dadkhoda Rural District, Kerman province
- Chah Dadkhoda, Sistan and Baluchestan
