= Konar-e Jamal =

Konar-e Jamal كنارجمال
- Village
- Interactive map of Konar-e Jamal
- Country: Iran
- Province: Kerman
- County: Qaleh Ganj
- Bakhsh: Chah Dadkhoda
- Rural District: Rameshk

Population (2006)
  - Total: 74
- Time zone: UTC+3:30 (IRST)
  - Summer (DST): UTC+4:30 (IRDT)

Konar-e Jamal (Persian: كنارجمال, also Romanized as Konār-e Jamāl) is a village in Rameshk Rural District, Chah Dadkhoda District, Qaleh Ganj County, Kerman Province, Iran. At the 2006 census, its population was 74, in 18 families.
