= Deh-e Kulak =

Deh-e Kulak ده کولک
- Village
- Location within Iran
- Coordinates: 26°47′44″N 58°50′00″E
- Country: Iran
- Province: Kerman
- County: Qaleh Ganj
- Bakhsh: Chah Dadkhoda
- Rural District: Rameshk

Population (2006)
  - Total: 253
- Time zone: UTC+3:30 (IRST)
  - Summer (DST): UTC+4:30 (IRDT)

Deh-e Kulak (Persian: ده کولک, also Romanized as Deh-e Kūlak; also known as Deh Kalak) is a village in Rameshk Rural District, Chah Dadkhoda District, Qaleh Ganj County, Kerman Province, Iran. At the 2006 census, its population was 253, in 60 families.
