= Gavahnchan =

Gavahnchan گوهنچان
- Village
- Location within Iran
- Coordinates: 26°54′45″N 58°41′40″E
- Country: Iran
- Province: Kerman
- County: Qaleh Ganj
- Bakhsh: Chah Dadkhoda
- Rural District: Rameshk

Population (2006)
  - Total: 122
- Time zone: UTC+3:30 (IRST)
  - Summer (DST): UTC+4:30 (IRDT)

Gavahnchan (Persian: گوهنچان, also Romanized as Gāvahnchān; also known as Gāvān Chāh, Gavānchān-e Bālā, Gāwanchān, and Gavānchūn) is a village in Rameshk Rural District, Chah Dadkhoda District, Qaleh Ganj County, Kerman Province, Iran. At the 2006 census, its population was 122, in 30 families.
