= Shahkahan =

Shahkahan شه كهان
- Village
- Location within Iran
- Coordinates: 26°58′17″N 57°57′17″E
- Country: Iran
- Province: Kerman
- County: Qaleh Ganj
- Bakhsh: Chah Dadkhoda
- Rural District: Marz

Population (2006)
  - Total: 311
- Time zone: UTC+3:30 (IRST)
  - Summer (DST): UTC+4:30 (IRDT)

Shahkahan (Persian: شه كهان, also Romanized as Shahkahān) is a village in Marz Rural District, Chah Dadkhoda District, Qaleh Ganj County, Kerman Province, Iran. At the 2006 census, its population was 311, in 71 families.
