= Salmaniyeh =

Salmaniyeh (Persian: سلمانيه) may refer to:

- Salmaniyeh, Jiroft, Kerman Province
- Salmaniyeh, Qaleh Ganj, Kerman Province
- Salmaniyeh, Khuzestan
- Salmaniyeh, Razavi Khorasan
