= Qal'eh Dokhtar (disambiguation) =

Qal'eh Dokhtar is a castle in Fars Province, Iran.

Qaleh Dokhtar or Qaleh-ye Dokhtar (Persian: قلعه دختر) may also refer to:

== Castles ==
=== Azerbaijan ===
- Qal'eh Dokhtar, Baku, a castle in Baku, Azerbaijan

=== Iran ===
- Qal'eh Dokhtar, Asiab, a castle in South Khorasan Province, Iran
- Qal'eh Dokhtar, Bileh Savar, a castle in Ardabil Province, Iran
- Qal'eh Dokhtar, Bishapur, a castle in Fars Province, Iran
- Qal'eh Dokhtar, Doruneh, a castle in Razavi Khorasan Province, Iran
- Qal'eh Dokhtar, Estahban, a castle in Fars Province, Iran
- Qal'eh Dokhtar, Ferdows, a castle in South Khorasan Province, Iran
- Qal'eh Dokhtar, Kerman, a castle in Kerman Province, Iran
- Qal'eh Dokhtar, Khosrowshah, a castle in East Azerbaijan Province, Iran
- Qal'eh Dokhtar, Mark, a castle in South Khorasan Province, Iran
- Qal'eh Dokhtar, Mianeh, a castle in East Azerbaijan Province, Iran
- Qal'eh Dokhtar, Qez Qaleh, a castle in East Azerbaijan Province, Iran
- Qal'eh Dokhtar, Qom, a castle in East Azerbaijan Province, Iran
- Qal'eh Dokhtar, Saveh, a castle in Markaz Province, Iran
- Qal'eh Dokhtar, Shurab, a castle in Razavi Khorasan Province, Iran
- Qal'eh Dokhtar II, a castle in Kerman Province, Iran

== Communities ==
- Qaleh-ye Dokhtar, Kerman, a village in Kerman, Iran
- Qaleh Dokhtar, Kohgiluyeh and Boyer-Ahmad, a village in Iran
- Qaleh Dokhtar, South Khorasan, a village in Kerman, Iran
