= Dar-e Kalat =

Dar-e Kalat دركلات
- Village
- Interactive map of Dar-e Kalat
- Coordinates: 26°55′08″N 58°05′32″E
- Country: Iran
- Province: Kerman
- County: Qaleh Ganj
- Bakhsh: Chah Dadkhoda
- Rural District: Marz

Population (2006)
  - Total: 261
- Time zone: UTC+3:30 (IRST)
  - Summer (DST): UTC+4:30 (IRDT)

Dar-e Kalat (Persian: دركلات, also Romanized as Dar-e Kalāt) is a village in Marz Rural District, Chah Dadkhoda District, Qaleh Ganj County, Kerman Province, Iran. At the 2006 census, its population was 261, in 57 families.
