= Sareh Kak =

Sareh Kak سره كك
- Village
- Location within Iran
- Coordinates: 26°52′30″N 58°08′57″E
- Country: Iran
- Province: Kerman
- County: Qaleh Ganj
- Bakhsh: Chah Dadkhoda
- Rural District: Marz

Population (2006)
  - Total: 18
- Time zone: UTC+3:30 (IRST)
  - Summer (DST): UTC+4:30 (IRDT)

Sareh Kak (Persian: سره كك; also known as Sar Kīk) is a village in Marz Rural District, Chah Dadkhoda District, Qaleh Ganj County, Kerman Province, Iran. At the 2006 census, its population was 18, in 4 families.
