= Gazkan =

Gazkan گزكان
- Village
- Location within Iran
- Coordinates: 27°04′09″N 58°17′24″E
- Country: Iran
- Province: Kerman
- County: Qaleh Ganj
- Bakhsh: Chah Dadkhoda
- Rural District: Chah Dadkhoda

Population (2006)
  - Total: 38
- Time zone: UTC+3:30 (IRST)
  - Summer (DST): UTC+4:30 (IRDT)

Gazkan (Persian: گزكان, also Romanized as Gazkān; also known as Gazgūn) is a village in Chah Dadkhoda Rural District, Chah Dadkhoda District, Qaleh Ganj County, Kerman Province, Iran. At the 2006 census, its population was 38, in 8 families.
