= Turig =

Turig (Persian: توريگ) may refer to:

- Turig (1)
- Turig (2)
- Turig (3)
