= Gari Charban =

Gari Charban گري چربان
- Village
- Location within Iran
- Coordinates: 26°45′00″N 58°35′24″E
- Country: Iran
- Province: Kerman
- County: Qaleh Ganj
- Bakhsh: Chah Dadkhoda
- Rural District: Rameshk

Population (2006)
  - Total: 67
- Time zone: UTC+3:30 (IRST)
  - Summer (DST): UTC+4:30 (IRDT)

Gari Charban (Persian: گري چربان, also Romanized as Garī Charbān) is a village in Rameshk Rural District, Chah Dadkhoda District, Qaleh Ganj County, Kerman Province, Iran. At the 2006 census, its population was 67, in 16 families.
