= Band-e Mahmud =

Band-e Mahmud بندمحمود
- Village
- Location within Iran
- Coordinates: 26°56′01″N 58°10′38″E
- Country: Iran
- Province: Kerman
- County: Qaleh Ganj
- Bakhsh: Chah Dadkhoda
- Rural District: Marz

Population (2006)
  - Total: 26
- Time zone: UTC+3:30 (IRST)
  - Summer (DST): UTC+4:30 (IRDT)

Band-e Mahmud (Persian: بندمحمود, also Romanized as Band-e Maḩmūd; also known as Bon Maḩmūd) is a village in Marz Rural District, Chah Dadkhoda District, Qaleh Ganj County, Kerman Province, Iran. At the 2006 census, its population was 26, in 6 families.
