= Kalahun-e Bala =

Kalahun-e Bala كلاهون بالا
- Village
- Interactive map of Kalahun-e Bala
- Country: Iran
- Province: Kerman
- County: Qaleh Ganj
- Bakhsh: Chah Dadkhoda
- Rural District: Marz

Population (2006)
  - Total: 38
- Time zone: UTC+3:30 (IRST)
  - Summer (DST): UTC+4:30 (IRDT)

Kalahun-e Bala (Persian: كلاهون بالا, also Romanized as Kalāhūn-e Bālā) is a village in Marz Rural District, Chah Dadkhoda District, Qaleh Ganj County, Kerman Province, Iran. At the 2006 census, its population was 38, in 8 families.
