= Bandgorgi =

Bandgorgi بندگرگي
- Village
- Location within Iran
- Coordinates: 26°50′15″N 58°25′21″E
- Country: Iran
- Province: Kerman
- County: Qaleh Ganj
- Bakhsh: Chah Dadkhoda
- Rural District: Marz

Population (2006)
  - Total: 19
- Time zone: UTC+3:30 (IRST)
  - Summer (DST): UTC+4:30 (IRDT)

Bandgorgi (Persian: بندگرگي, also Romanized as Bandgorgī) is a village in Marz Rural District, Chah Dadkhoda District, Qaleh Ganj County, Kerman Province, Iran. As of the 2006 census, its population was 19, among 4 families.
