= Konar-e Gavan =

Konar-e Gavan كنارگاوان
- Village
- Interactive map of Konar-e Gavan
- Country: Iran
- Province: Kerman
- County: Qaleh Ganj
- Bakhsh: Chah Dadkhoda
- Rural District: Rameshk

Population (2006)
  - Total: 48
- Time zone: UTC+3:30 (IRST)
  - Summer (DST): UTC+4:30 (IRDT)

Konar-e Gavan (Persian: كنارگاوان, also Romanized as Konār-e Gāvān) is a village in Rameshk Rural District, Chah Dadkhoda District, Qaleh Ganj County, Kerman Province, Iran. At the 2006 census, its population was 48, in 12 families.
