= Zirabad-e Zirab =

Zirabad-e Zirab زيراباد زيراب
- Village
- Location within Iran
- Coordinates: 26°51′20″N 58°44′49″E
- Country: Iran
- Province: Kerman
- County: Qaleh Ganj
- Bakhsh: Chah Dadkhoda
- Rural District: Rameshk

Population (2006)
  - Total: 81
- Time zone: UTC+3:30 (IRST)
  - Summer (DST): UTC+4:30 (IRDT)

Zirabad-e Zirab (Persian: زيراباد زيراب, also Romanized as Zīrābād-e Zīrāb; also known as Zīrābād) is a village in Rameshk Rural District, Chah Dadkhoda District, Qaleh Ganj County, Kerman Province, Iran. At the 2006 census, its population was 81, in 20 families.
