= Giahan =

Giahan گياهان
- Village
- Location within Iran
- Coordinates: 26°55′12″N 58°46′48″E
- Country: Iran
- Province: Kerman
- County: Qaleh Ganj
- Bakhsh: Chah Dadkhoda
- Rural District: Rameshk

Population (2023)
  - Total: 100
- Time zone: UTC+3:30 (IRST)
  - Summer (DST): UTC+4:30 (IRDT)

Giahan (Persian: گياهان, also Romanized as Gīāhān) is a village in Rameshk Rural District, Chah Dadkhoda District, Qaleh Ganj County, Kerman Province, Iran. At the 2006 census, its population was 58, in 12 families.
