= Nahugan =

Nahugan ناهوگان
- Village
- Location within Iran
- Coordinates: 26°52′46″N 58°05′44″E
- Country: Iran
- Province: Kerman
- County: Qaleh Ganj
- Bakhsh: Chah Dadkhoda
- Rural District: Marz

Population (2006)
  - Total: 58
- Time zone: UTC+3:30 (IRST)
  - Summer (DST): UTC+4:30 (IRDT)

Nahugan (Persian: ناهوگان, also Romanized as Nāhūgān) is a village in Marz Rural District, Chah Dadkhoda District, Qaleh Ganj County, Kerman Province, Iran. At the 2006 census, its population was 58, in 10 families.
