= Mahmanak =

Mahmanak ماه مانك
- Village
- Location within Iran
- Coordinates: 27°00′56″N 58°02′33″E
- Country: Iran
- Province: Kerman
- County: Qaleh Ganj
- Bakhsh: Chah Dadkhoda
- Rural District: Marz

Population (2006)
  - Total: 19
- Time zone: UTC+3:30 (IRST)
  - Summer (DST): UTC+4:30 (IRDT)

Mahmanak (Persian: ماه مانك, also Romanized as Māhmānak; also known as Māmānak) is a village in Marz Rural District, Chah Dadkhoda District, Qaleh Ganj County, Kerman Province, Iran. At the 2006 census, its population was 19, in 5 families.
