= Chah ol Madin =

Chah ol Madin چاه ال مدين
- Village
- Location within Iran
- Coordinates: 27°01′28″N 58°27′00″E
- Country: Iran
- Province: Kerman
- County: Qaleh Ganj
- Bakhsh: Chah Dadkhoda
- Rural District: Chah Dadkhoda

Population (2006)
  - Total: 262
- Time zone: UTC+3:30 (IRST)
  - Summer (DST): UTC+4:30 (IRDT)

Chah ol Madin (Persian: چاه ال مدين, also Romanized as Chāh ol Madīn and Chāholmahdīn) is a village in Chah Dadkhoda Rural District, Chah Dadkhoda District, Qaleh Ganj County, Kerman Province, Iran. At the 2006 census, its population was 262, in 63 families.
