= Kangaru, Iran =

Village in Kerman province, Iran

Kangaru Persian: كنگرو
- Village
- Location within Iran
- Coordinates: 26°57′31″N 58°37′51″E
- Country: Iran
- Province: Kerman
- County: Qaleh Ganj
- District: Chah Dadkhoda
- Rural District: Rameshk

Population (2016)
  - Total: 632
- Time zone: UTC+3:30 (IRST)

Kangaru (Persian: كنگرو) (Note: Also romanized as Kangarū; also known as Kangarūd) is a village in, and the capital of, Rameshk Rural District of Chah Dadkhoda District in Qaleh Ganj County, Kerman province, Iran. The previous capital of the rural district was the village of Rameshk, now a city.

== Demographics ==
=== Population ===
At the time of the 2006 National Census, the village's population was 365 in 87 households. The following census in 2011 counted 649 people in 161 households. The 2016 census measured the population of the village as 632 people in 158 households.
