= Turig (3) =

Turig (3) توريگ(3)
- Village
- Interactive map of Turig (3)
- Country: Iran
- Province: Kerman
- County: Qaleh Ganj
- Bakhsh: Chah Dadkhoda
- Rural District: Chah Dadkhoda

Population (2006)
  - Total: 317
- Time zone: UTC+3:30 (IRST)
  - Summer (DST): UTC+4:30 (IRDT)

Turig (3) (Persian: توريگ(3), also Romanized as Tūrīg (3)) is a village in Chah Dadkhoda Rural District, Chah Dadkhoda District, Qaleh Ganj County, Kerman Province, Iran. At the 2006 census, its population was 317, in 68 families.
