= Ladu =

Ladu may refer to:

- Ladu, Afghanistan
- Ladu, Iran
- Laddu or Ladu, a South Asian confection
