= Suru, Kerman =

Suru سورو
- Village
- Location within Iran
- Coordinates: 26°55′12″N 58°03′37″E
- Country: Iran
- Province: Kerman
- County: Qaleh Ganj
- Bakhsh: Chah Dadkhoda
- Rural District: Chah Dadkhoda

Population (2006)
  - Total: 139
- Time zone: UTC+3:30 (IRST)
  - Summer (DST): UTC+4:30 (IRDT)

Suru (Persian: سورو, also Romanized as Sūrū; also known as Sūrūk) is a village in Chah Dadkhoda Rural District, Chah Dadkhoda District, Qaleh Ganj County, Kerman Province, Iran. At the 2006 census, its population was 139, in 23 families.
