= Hoori (disambiguation) =

Hoori (火遠理命, hoori no mikoto) is a figure in Japanese mythology.

Hoori may also refer to:

- Hoori (Islam) (hooriyah in female form), a native inhabitant of heaven in Islamic belief
- Hooria Mashhour, Yemeni politician
- Hoori Noorani, Pakistani classical dancer, artist and publisher

== See also ==
- Hoor, Iran
