= Suru =

Suru may refer to:

- Suru, Estonia, village in Estonia
- Suru, Bushehr, village in Bushehr province, Iran
- Suru, Hormozgan, village in Hormozgan province, Iran
- Suru, Kerman, village in Kerman province, Iran
- Suru, Sistan and Baluchestan, village in Sistan and Baluchestan province, Iran
- Suru, Nigeria, Local Government Area in Kebbi State, Nigeria
- Suru River (Boia), headwater of the Boia Mică River in Romania
- Suru River (Indus), tributary of the Indus River in India
- Suru Valley, valley in the Ladakh region of Jammu and Kashmir
- Casuarina equisetifolia, a type of sheoak
