= Pilum, Iran =

Pilum پيلوم
- Village
- Location within Iran
- Coordinates: 26°52′29″N 58°45′43″E
- Country: Iran
- Province: Kerman
- County: Qaleh Ganj
- Bakhsh: Chah Dadkhoda
- Rural District: Rameshk

Population (2006)
  - Total: 44
- Time zone: UTC+3:30 (IRST)
  - Summer (DST): UTC+4:30 (IRDT)

Pilum (Persian: پيلوم, also Romanized as Pīlūm) is a village in Rameshk Rural District, Chah Dadkhoda District, Qaleh Ganj County, Kerman Province, Iran. At the 2006 census, its population was 44, in 10 families.
