= Banam Rud =

Banam Rud بنمرود
- village
- Location within Iran
- Coordinates: 33°18′20″N 59°48′48″E
- Country: Iran
- Province: South Khorasan
- County: Zirkuh
- Bakhsh: Zohan
- Rural District: Zohan

Population (2006)
  - Total: 429
- Time zone: UTC+3:30 (IRST)
  - Summer (DST): UTC+4:30 (IRDT)

Banam Rud (Persian: بنمرود, also Romanized as Banam Rūd) is a village in Zohan Rural District, Zohan District, Zirkuh County, South Khorasan Province, Iran. At the 2006 census, its population was 429, in 101 families.
