= Sik, Iran =

Sik سيك
- Village
- Country: Iran
- Province: Kerman
- County: Qaleh Ganj
- Bakhsh: Chah Dadkhoda
- Rural District: Marz

Population (2006)
  - Total: 103
- Time zone: UTC+3:30 (IRST)
  - Summer (DST): UTC+4:30 (IRDT)

Sik (Persian: سيك, also Romanized as Sīk) is a village in Marz Rural District, Chah Dadkhoda District, Qaleh Ganj County, Kerman Province, Iran. At the 2006 census, its population was 103, in 22 families.
