= Zardan =

Zardan (Persian: زردان) may refer to:

- Zardan, Sistan and Baluchestan
- Zardan, Zirkuh, South Khorasan Province
- Zardan, Yazd
