= Rain Qaleh =

Village in Kerman province, Iran

Rain Qaleh Persian: رائين قلعه
- Village
- Location within Iran
- Coordinates: 26°52′58″N 58°08′29″E
- Country: Iran
- Province: Kerman
- County: Qaleh Ganj
- District: Chah Dadkhoda
- Rural District: Marz

Population (2016)
  - Total: 565
- Time zone: UTC+3:30 (IRST)

Rain Qaleh (Persian: رائين قلعه) (Note: Also romanized as Rā’īn Qal‘eh and Rāyen Qal‘eh) is a village in, and the capital of, Marz Rural District of Chah Dadkhoda District, Qaleh Ganj County, Kerman province, Iran.

== Demographics ==
=== Population ===
At the time of the 2006 National Census, the village's population was 293 in 63 households. The following census in 2011 counted 621 people in 126 households. The 2016 census measured the population of the village as 565 people in 134 households. It was the most populous village in its rural district.
