= Rustai-ye Chadranshin Owrtin =

Village in Kerman province, Iran

Rustai-ye Chadranshin Owrtin Persian: روستاي چادرنشين اورتين
- Village
- Location within Iran
- Coordinates: 27°10′29″N 58°24′54″E
- Country: Iran
- Province: Kerman
- County: Qaleh Ganj
- District: Chah Dadkhoda
- Rural District: Chah Dadkhoda

Population (2016)
  - Total: 1,340
- Time zone: UTC+3:30 (IRST)

Rustai-ye Chadranshin Owrtin (Persian: روستاي چادرنشين اورتين) (Note: Also romanized as Rūstāyī-ye Chādranshīn Owrtīn) is a village in Chah Dadkhoda Rural District of Chah Dadkhoda District, Qaleh Ganj County, Kerman province, Iran.

== Demographics ==
=== Population ===
At the time of the 2006 National Census, the village's population was 1,558 in 301 households. The following census in 2011 counted 1,773 people in 368 households. The 2016 census measured the population of the village as 1,340 people in 331 households. It was the most populous village in its rural district.
