= Tiz Kuh =

Tiz Kuh تيزكوه
- Village
- Location within Iran
- Coordinates: 33°32′26″N 59°33′39″E
- Country: Iran
- Province: South Khorasan
- County: Zirkuh
- Bakhsh: Zohan
- Rural District: Afin

Population (2006)
  - Total: 44
- Time zone: UTC+3:30 (IRST)
  - Summer (DST): UTC+4:30 (IRDT)

Tiz Kuh (Persian: تيزكوه, also Romanized as Tīz Kūh) is a village in Afin Rural District, Zohan District, Zirkuh County, South Khorasan Province, Iran. At the 2006 census, its population was 44, in 9 families.
