= Zohan, Kerman =

Zohan زهان
- Village
- Location within Iran
- Coordinates: 27°13′59″N 58°34′22″E
- Country: Iran
- Province: Kerman
- County: Qaleh Ganj
- Bakhsh: Chah Dadkhoda
- Rural District: Chah Dadkhoda

Population (2006)
  - Total: 265
- Time zone: UTC+3:30 (IRST)
  - Summer (DST): UTC+4:30 (IRDT)

Zohan (Persian: زهان, also Romanized as Zohān) is a village in Chah Dadkhoda Rural District, Chah Dadkhoda District, Qaleh Ganj County, Kerman Province, Iran. At the 2006 census, its population was 265, in 51 families.
