= Hur, Qaleh Ganj =

Hur حور
- Village
- Location within Iran
- Coordinates: 26°59′37″N 58°37′36″E
- Country: Iran
- Province: Kerman
- County: Qaleh Ganj
- Bakhsh: Chah Dadkhoda
- Rural District: Rameshk

Population (2006)
  - Total: 46
- Time zone: UTC+3:30 (IRST)
  - Summer (DST): UTC+4:30 (IRDT)

Hur (Persian: حور, also Romanized as Ḩūr, Hūr, and Hoor; also known as Ḩavvā) is a village in Rameshk Rural District, Chah Dadkhoda District, Qaleh Ganj County, Kerman Province, Iran. At the 2006 census, its population was 46, in 13 families.
