= Shend =

Shend or Shand (Persian: شند) may refer to:

- Shend, Razavi Khorasan
- Shend, Sistan and Baluchestan
- Shand, South Khorasan

For musician and podcaster The Shend see The Cravats and The Very Things
