= Turig (1) =

Turig (1) توريگ(1)
- Village
- Location within Iran
- Coordinates: 27°12′17″N 58°34′57″E
- Country: Iran
- Province: Kerman
- County: Qaleh Ganj
- Bakhsh: Chah Dadkhoda
- Rural District: Chah Dadkhoda

Population (2006)
  - Total: 80
- Time zone: UTC+3:30 (IRST)
  - Summer (DST): UTC+4:30 (IRDT)

Turig(1) (Persian: توريگ(1), also Romanized as Tūrīg (1); also known as Tūrīg) is a village in Chah Dadkhoda Rural District, Chah Dadkhoda District, Qaleh Ganj County, Kerman Province, Iran. At the 2006 census, its population was 80, in 15 families.
