= Moqilan =

Moqilan مقيلان
- village
- Location within Iran
- Coordinates: 33°18′16″N 59°54′43″E
- Country: Iran
- Province: South Khorasan
- County: Zirkuh
- Bakhsh: Zohan
- Rural District: Zohan

Population (2006)
  - Total: 242
- Time zone: UTC+3:30 (IRST)
  - Summer (DST): UTC+4:30 (IRDT)

Moqilan (Persian: مقيلان, also Romanized as Moqīlān, Maghīlān, and Magīlān) is a village in Zohan Rural District, Zohan District, Zirkuh County, South Khorasan Province, Iran. At the 2006 census, its population was 242, in 78 families.
