= Jatu, Iran =

Jatu جتو
- Village
- Location within Iran
- Coordinates: 27°08′09″N 58°02′57″E
- Country: Iran
- Province: Kerman
- County: Qaleh Ganj
- Bakhsh: Chah Dadkhoda
- Rural District: Marz

Population (2006)
  - Total: 21
- Time zone: UTC+3:30 (IRST)
  - Summer (DST): UTC+4:30 (IRDT)

Jatu (Persian: جتو, also Romanized as Jatū) is a village in Marz Rural District, Chah Dadkhoda District, Qaleh Ganj County, Kerman Province, Iran. At the 2006 census, its population was 21, in 5 families.
