= Shirk-e Sorjeh =

Village in South Khorasan province, Iran

Shirk-e Sorjeh Persian: شيرك سرجه
- Village
- Location within Iran
- Coordinates: 33°17′10″N 59°46′41″E
- Country: Iran
- Province: South Khorasan
- County: Zirkuh
- District: Zohan
- Rural District: Zohan

Population (2016)
  - Total: 1,115
- Time zone: UTC+3:30 (IRST)

Shirk-e Sorjeh (Persian: شيرك سرجه) (Note: Also romanized as Shīrk-e Sorjeh; also known as Shīrag, Shīrg, Shīrk, and Shīrk-e Sājī (شيرك ساجي)) is a village in Zohan Rural District of Zohan District in Zirkuh County, South Khorasan province, Iran. It is located along the Qohestan–Zohan road, 89 kilometres (55 mi) by road northeast of Birjand.

== Demographics ==
=== Population ===
At the time of the 2006 National Census, the village's population was 1,156 in 265 households, when it was in Qaen County. The following census in 2011 counted 962 people in 281 households. The 2016 census measured the population of the village as 1,115 people in 340 households, by which time the district had been separated from the county in the establishment of Zirkuh County. Shirk-e Sorjeh was the most populous village in its rural district.
