= Jan Ahmad, South Khorasan =

Village in South Khorasan province, Iran

Jan Ahmad Persian: جان احمد
- Village
- Location within Iran
- Coordinates: 33°20′28″N 59°49′49″E
- Country: Iran
- Province: South Khorasan
- County: Zirkuh
- District: Zohan
- Rural District: Zohan

Population (2016)
  - Total: 362
- Time zone: UTC+3:30 (IRST)

Jan Ahmad (Persian: جان احمد) (Note: Also romanized as Jān Aḩmad) is a village in Zohan Rural District of Zohan District in Zirkuh County, South Khorasan province, Iran.

== Demographics ==
=== Population ===
At the time of the 2006 National Census, the village's population was 398 in 106 households, when it was in Qaen County. The following census in 2011 counted 286 people in 86 households. The 2016 census measured the population of the village as 362 people in 116 households, by which time the district had been separated from the county in the establishment of Zirkuh County.
