= Jatu =

Jatu may refer to:

- Jatu, Iran, a village in Iran
- Jatu language, a dialect also known as "Haryanvi"

== See also ==
- Jattu, a town in Nigeria
