= Shir Khond =

Village in South Khorasan province, Iran

Shir Khond Persian: شيرخند
- Village
- Location within Iran
- Coordinates: 33°24′44″N 59°40′12″E
- Country: Iran
- Province: South Khorasan
- County: Zirkuh
- District: Zohan
- Rural District: Afin

Population (2016)
  - Total: 303
- Time zone: UTC+3:30 (IRST)

Shir Khond (Persian: شيرخند) (Note: Also romanized as Shīr Khond and Shīrkhand; also known as Shahr-e Khāh and Shīr Khān) is a village in Afin Rural District of Zohan District in Zirkuh County, South Khorasan province, Iran.

== Demographics ==
=== Population ===
At the time of the 2006 National Census, the village's population was 378 in 116 households, when it was in Qaen County. The following census in 2011 counted 294 people in 112 households. The 2016 census measured the population of the village as 303 people in 105 households, by which time the district had been separated from the county in the establishment of Zirkuh County.
