= Sarjin =

Village in South Khorasan province, Iran

Sarjin Persian: سارجين
- Village
- Location within Iran
- Coordinates: 33°18′10″N 59°47′05″E
- Country: Iran
- Province: South Khorasan
- County: Zirkuh
- District: Zohan
- Rural District: Zohan

Population (2016)
  - Total: 402
- Time zone: UTC+3:30 (IRST)

Sarjin (Persian: سارجين) (Note: Also romanized as Sārjīn; also known as Sārjī) is a village in Zohan Rural District of Zohan District in Zirkuh County, South Khorasan province, Iran.

== Demographics ==
=== Population ===
At the time of the 2006 National Census, the village's population was 393 in 106 households, when it was in Qaen County. The following census in 2011 counted 459 people in 117 households. The 2016 census measured the population of the village as 402 people in 111 households, by which time the district had been separated from the county in the establishment of Zirkuh County.
