= Baymargh =

Baymargh باي مرغ
- Village
- Location within Iran
- Coordinates: 33°19′48″N 59°48′02″E
- Country: Iran
- Province: South Khorasan
- County: Zirkuh
- Bakhsh: Zohan
- Rural District: Zohan

Population (2006)
  - Total: 301
- Time zone: UTC+3:30 (IRST)
  - Summer (DST): UTC+4:30 (IRDT)

Baymargh (Persian: باي مرغ, also Romanized as Bāymargh; also known as Bei Mār, Bīmār, and Pāymorgh) is a village in Zohan Rural District, Zohan District, Zirkuh County, South Khorasan Province, Iran. At the 2006 census, its population was 301, in 83 families.
