= Hoseynabad, Zohan =

Village in South Khorasan province, Iran

Hoseynabad Persian: حسين اباد
- Village
- Location within Iran
- Coordinates: 33°29′25″N 59°34′21″E
- Country: Iran
- Province: South Khorasan
- County: Zirkuh
- District: Zohan
- Rural District: Afin

Population (2016)
  - Total: 171
- Time zone: UTC+3:30 (IRST)

Hoseynabad (Persian: حسين اباد) (Note: Also romanized as Ḩoseynābād) is a village in Afin Rural District of Zohan District in Zirkuh County, South Khorasan province, Iran.

== Demographics ==
=== Population ===
At the time of the 2006 National Census, the village's population was 216 in 52 households, when it was in Qaen County. The following census in 2011 counted 147 people in 40 households. The 2016 census measured the population of the village as 171 people in 55 households, by which time the district had been separated from the county in the establishment of Zirkuh County.
