= Baghestan, Zirkuh =

Baghestan باغستان
- village
- Location within Iran
- Coordinates: 33°24′00″N 59°48′20″E
- Country: Iran
- Province: South Khorasan
- County: Zirkuh
- Bakhsh: Zohan
- Rural District: Zohan

Population (2006)
  - Total: 104
- Time zone: UTC+3:30 (IRST)
  - Summer (DST): UTC+4:30 (IRDT)

Baghestan (Persian: باغستان, also Romanized as Bāghestān; also known as Bāghestān-e Zohān and Zohān) is a village in Zohan Rural District, Zohan District, Zirkuh County, South Khorasan Province, Iran. At the 2006 census, its population was 104, in 30 families.
