= Pardan =

Village in South Khorasan province, Iran

Pardan Persian: پردان
- Village
- Location within Iran
- Coordinates: 33°24′16″N 59°53′27″E
- Country: Iran
- Province: South Khorasan
- County: Zirkuh
- District: Zohan
- Rural District: Zohan

Population (2016)
  - Total: 426
- Time zone: UTC+3:30 (IRST)

Pardan (Persian: پردان) (Note: Also romanized as Pardān; also known as Ferdū, Pardūn, and Pherdu) is a village in Zohan Rural District of Zohan District in Zirkuh County, South Khorasan province, Iran.

== Demographics ==
=== Population ===
At the time of the 2006 National Census, the village's population was 498 in 130 households, when it was in Qaen County. The following census in 2011 counted 483 people in 142 households. The 2016 census measured the population of the village as 426 people in 134 households, by which time the district had been separated from the county in the establishment of Zirkuh County.
