= Fakhran =

Village in South Khorasan province, Iran

Fakhran Persian: فخران
- Village
- Location within Iran
- Coordinates: 33°20′44″N 59°41′57″E
- Country: Iran
- Province: South Khorasan
- County: Zirkuh
- District: Zohan
- Rural District: Zohan

Population (2016)
  - Total: 473
- Time zone: UTC+3:30 (IRST)

Fakhran (Persian: فخران) (Note: Also romanized as Fakhrān; formerly known as Shahrak-e Fakhran (شهرك فخران), also romanized as Shahrak-e Fakhrān) is a village in Zohan Rural District of Zohan District in Zirkuh County, South Khorasan province, Iran.

== Demographics ==
=== Population ===
At the time of the 2006 National Census, the village's population was 642 in 142 households, when it was listed as Shahrak-e Fakhran in Qaen County. The following census in 2011 counted 540 people in 135 households, by which time the village was listed as Fakhran. The 2016 census measured the population of the village as 473 people in 126 households, when the district had been separated from the county in the establishment of Zirkuh County.
