= Bimar =

Bimar may refer to:

- Bimad, Iran
- Baymargh, Iran
