= Afin =

Village in South Khorasan province, Iran

Afin Persian: افين
- Village
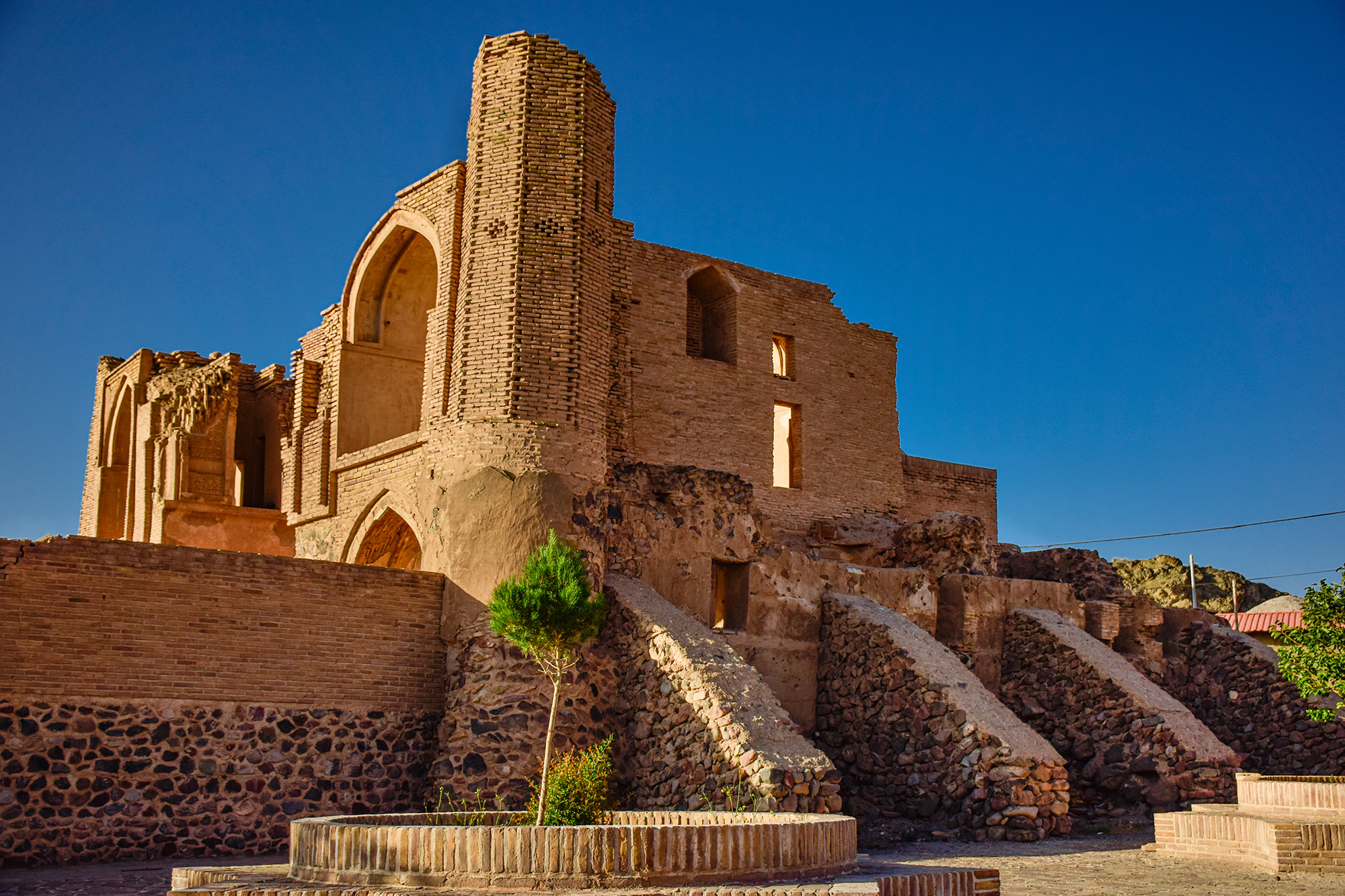
- Historical mosque in the village of Afin

- Location within Iran
- Coordinates: 33°31′34″N 59°44′55″E
- Country: Iran
- Province: South Khorasan
- County: Zirkuh
- District: Zohan
- Rural District: Afin

Population (2016)
  - Total: 1,215
- Time zone: UTC+3:30 (IRST)

Afin (Persian: افين) (Note: Also romanized as Āfīn; also known as Afih) is a village in, and the capital of, Afin Rural District in Zohan District of Zirkuh County, South Khorasan province, Iran.

== Demographics ==
=== Population ===
At the time of the 2006 National Census, the village's population was 1,465 in 415 households, when it was in Qaen County. The following census in 2011 counted 1,315 people in 418 households. The 2016 census measured the population of the village as 1,215 people in 402 households, by which time the district had been separated from the county in the establishment of Zirkuh County. Afin was the most populous village in its rural district.

== See also ==
Media related to Afin at Wikimedia Commons
