= Shaj =

Shaj شاج
- Village
- Location within Iran
- Coordinates: 33°28′41″N 59°34′02″E
- Country: Iran
- Province: South Khorasan
- County: Zirkuh
- Bakhsh: Zohan
- Rural District: Afin

Population (2006)
  - Total: 187
- Time zone: UTC+3:30 (IRST)
  - Summer (DST): UTC+4:30 (IRDT)

Shaj (Persian: شاج, also Romanized as Shāj, Shāch, and Shāsh) is a village in Afin Rural District, Zohan District, Zirkuh County, South Khorasan Province, Iran. At the 2006 census, its population was 187, in 56 families.
