= Chil Konar =

Chil Konar (Persian: چيل كنار) may refer to:

- Chil Konar, Kerman
- Chil Konar, Sistan and Baluchestan
