= Qaleh Dokhtar, South Khorasan =

Village in South Khorasan, Iran

Qaleh Dokhtar قلعه دختر
- Village
- Location within Iran
- Coordinates: 33°37′57″N 59°31′33″E
- Country: Iran
- Province: South Khorasan
- County: Zirkuh
- Bakhsh: Zohan
- Rural District: Afin

Population (2006)
  - Total: 47
- Time zone: UTC+3:30 (IRST)
  - Summer (DST): UTC+4:30 (IRDT)

Qaleh Dokhtar (Persian: قلعه دختر, also Romanized as Qal‘eh Dokhtar; also known as Dokhtar, Kalāteh Dukhtar, and Kūh-e Dokhtar) is a village in Afin Rural District, Zohan District, Zirkuh County, South Khorasan Province, Iran. At the 2006 census, its population was 47, in 13 families.
