= Pilum (disambiguation) =

Pilum is the heavy javelin of the Roman legions.

Pilum may also refer to:

- Pilum (Battlefield 2142 anti-vehicle weapon)
- Pilum, Iran, a village in Kerman Province, Iran
- 41st Unmanned Systems Regiment "Pilum", a military formation within the 1st Azov Corps of Ukraine
