= Shahrak-e Sindar =

Village in South Khorasan province, Iran

Shahrak-e Sindar Persian: شهرك سيندر
- Village
- Location within Iran
- Coordinates: 33°37′55″N 59°29′28″E
- Country: Iran
- Province: South Khorasan
- County: Zirkuh
- District: Zohan
- Rural District: Afin

Population (2016)
  - Total: 372
- Time zone: UTC+3:30 (IRST)

Shahrak-e Sindar (Persian: شهرك سيندر) (Note: Also romanized as Shahrak-e Sīndar; also known as Sīnandar, Sīndar, Sīnīdar, and Sinīdar) is a village in Afin Rural District of Zohan District in Zirkuh County, South Khorasan province, Iran.

== Demographics ==
=== Population ===
At the time of the 2006 National Census, the village's population was 425 in 97 households, when it was in Qaen County. The following census in 2011 counted 368 people in 112 households. The 2016 census measured the population of the village as 372 people in 111 households, by which time the district had been separated from the county in the establishment of Zirkuh County.
