= Shash =

Shash may refer to:

- Shash, Iran, village in Iran
- Shash Appan, Welsh LGBT+ and anti-racist activist
- Shash or Chach, a historical name of the place and province in place of modern Tashkent and Tashkent Region
