= Payehan =

Village in South Khorasan province, Iran

Payehan Persian: پايهان
- Village
- Location within Iran
- Coordinates: 33°26′19″N 59°48′13″E
- Country: Iran
- Province: South Khorasan
- County: Zirkuh
- District: Zohan
- Rural District: Zohan

Population (2016)
  - Total: 363
- Time zone: UTC+3:30 (IRST)

Payehan (Persian: پايهان) (Note: Also romanized as Pāyehān; also known as Eyhān and Pihun) is a village in Zohan Rural District of Zohan District in Zirkuh County, South Khorasan province, Iran.

== Demographics ==
=== Population ===
At the time of the 2006 National Census, the village's population was 365 in 111 households, when it was in Qaen County. The following census in 2011 counted 331 people in 102 households. The 2016 census measured the population of the village as 363 people in 136 households, by which time the district had been separated from the county in the establishment of Zirkuh County.
