= Sik =

Sik or SIK may refer to:

- Sik District, a district in Kedah, Malaysia
- Sik (federal constituency), Dewan Rakyat, Malaysia
- Sik, Iran, a village
- Sik (roller coaster), an amusement park ride at Flamingo Land, United Kingdom
- Sik, South Khorasan, a village in Iran
- Sik (goat), nickname for Netherlands NS Class 200 locomotives
- Michael Sik Yuen, Mauritian politician
- Sikkim, obsolete UNDP country code

== See also ==
- Sikh
