= Kalateh-ye Mazar, Zirkuh =

Village in South Khorasan province, Iran

Kalateh-ye Mazar Persian: كلاته مزار
- Village
- Location within Iran
- Coordinates: 33°19′21″N 59°47′35″E
- Country: Iran
- Province: South Khorasan
- County: Zirkuh
- District: Zohan
- Rural District: Zohan

Population (2016)
  - Total: 358
- Time zone: UTC+3:30 (IRST)

Kalateh-ye Mazar (Persian: كلاته مزار) (Note: Also romanized as Kalāteh Mazār and Kalāteh-ye Mazār; also known as Mazār) is a village in Zohan Rural District of Zohan District in Zirkuh County, South Khorasan province, Iran.

== Demographics ==
=== Population ===
At the time of the 2006 National Census, the village's population was 377 in 102 households, when it was in Qaen County. The following census in 2011 counted 365 people in 116 households. The 2016 census measured the population of the village as 358 people in 108 households, by which time the district had been separated from the county in the establishment of Zirkuh County.
