= Davaran =

Davaran (Persian: داوران) may refer to:

- Davaran, Isfahan
- Davaran, Qaleh Ganj, Kerman Province
- Davaran, Rafsanjan, Kerman Province
