= Abbasabad, Zirkuh =

Village in South Khorasan province, Iran

Abbasabad Persian: عباس اباد
- Village
- Location within Iran
- Coordinates: 33°29′35″N 59°37′39″E
- Country: Iran
- Province: South Khorasan
- County: Zirkuh
- District: Zohan
- Rural District: Afin

Population (2016)
  - Total: 326
- Time zone: UTC+3:30 (IRST)

Abbasabad (Persian: عباس اباد) (Note: Also romanized as ‘Abbāsābād) is a village in Afin Rural District of Zohan District in Zirkuh County, South Khorasan province, Iran.

== Demographics ==
=== Population ===
At the time of the 2006 National Census, the village's population was 346 in 76 households, when it was in Qaen County. The following census in 2011 counted 276 people in 78 households. The 2016 census measured the population of the village as 326 people in 93 households, by which time the district had been separated from the county in the establishment of Zirkuh County.
