= Kabudan, South Khorasan =

Village in South Khorasan province, Iran

Kabudan Persian: كبودان
- Village
- Location within Iran
- Coordinates: 33°25′10″N 59°42′07″E
- Country: Iran
- Province: South Khorasan
- County: Zirkuh
- District: Zohan
- Rural District: Afin

Population (2016)
  - Total: 982
- Time zone: UTC+3:30 (IRST)

Kabudan (Persian: كبودان) (Note: Also romanized as Kabūdān) is a village in Afin Rural District of Zohan District in Zirkuh County, South Khorasan province, Iran.

== Demographics ==
=== Population ===
At the time of the 2006 National Census, the village's population was 922 in 232 households, when it was in Qaen County. The following census in 2011 counted 1,075 people in 314 households. The 2016 census measured the population of the village as 982 people in 282 households, by which time the district had been separated from the county in the establishment of Zirkuh County.
