= Baghak, Afghanistan =

Baghak باغگ
- Village
- Country: Afghanistan
- Province: Bamyan

Baghak (Persian: باغگ) is a village near the Shakari valley in Bamyan Province, Afghanistan.

== History ==
On 4 August 2012, the Battle of Baghak took place during the War in Afghanistan between elements of the New Zealand Defence Force (NZDF), the Afghani National Directorate of Security (NDS) and Taliban insurgent forces. The result was Coalition victory and insurgent attack repelled. The battle of Baghak resulted in 8 New Zealand casualties, 13 NDS casualties, 2 civilian casualties and an unknown number of Insurgent casualties. 4 NDS personal and 2 New Zealand soldiers were killed.
