= Qaleh-ye Dokhtar, Kerman =

Qaleh-ye Dokhtar قلعه دختر
- Village
- Country: Iran
- Province: Kerman
- County: Qaleh Ganj
- Bakhsh: Central
- Rural District: Sorkh Qaleh

Population (2006)
  - Total: 119
- Time zone: UTC+3:30 (IRST)
  - Summer (DST): UTC+4:30 (IRDT)

Qaleh-ye Dokhtar (Persian: قلعه دختر, also Romanized as Qal‘eh-ye Dokhtar) is a village in Sorkh Qaleh Rural District, in the Central District of Qaleh Ganj County, Kerman Province, Iran. At the 2006 census, its population was 119, with 40 families.
