= Zardan, Zirkuh =

Village in South Khorasan province, Iran

Zardan Persian: زردان
- Village
- Location within Iran
- Coordinates: 33°26′58″N 59°37′21″E
- Country: Iran
- Province: South Khorasan
- County: Zirkuh
- District: Zohan
- Rural District: Afin

Population (2016)
  - Total: 187
- Time zone: UTC+3:30 (IRST)

Zardan (Persian: زردان) (Note: Also romanized as Zardān; also known as Zardāb, Zardāh, Zardow, and Zowrdān) is a village in Afin Rural District of Zohan District in Zirkuh County, South Khorasan province, Iran.

== Demographics ==
=== Population ===
At the time of the 2006 National Census, the village's population was 157 in 41 households, when it was in Qaen County. The following census in 2011 counted 151 people in 49 households. The 2016 census measured the population of the village as 187 people in 52 households, by which time the district had been separated from the county in the establishment of Zirkuh County.
