= Rameshk =

City in Kerman province, Iran

Rameshk Persian: رمشک
- City
- Location within Iran
- Coordinates: 26°49′35″N 58°48′17″E
- Country: Iran
- Province: Kerman
- County: Qaleh Ganj
- District: Chah Dadkhoda

Population (2016)
  - Total: 3,589
- Time zone: UTC+3:30 (IRST)

Rameshk (Persian: رمشک) (Note: Also romanized as Remeshk; also known as Rāmīshk) is a city in Chah Dadkhoda District of Qaleh Ganj County, Kerman province, Iran. As a village, it was the capital of Rameshk Rural District until its capital was transferred to the village of Kangaru.

== Demographics ==
=== Population ===
At the time of the 2006 National Census, Rameshk's population was 2,874 in 510 households, when it was a village in Rameshk Rural District. The following census in 2011 counted 3,174 people in 780 households. The 2016 census measured the population of the village as 3,589 people in 869 households. It was the most populous village in its rural district.

Rameshk was elevated to the status of a city in 2017.
