= Chah Dadkhoda, Kerman =

City in Kerman province, Iran

Chah Dadkhoda Persian: چاه دادخدا
- City
- Location within Iran
- Coordinates: 27°17′08″N 58°15′45″E
- Country: Iran
- Province: Kerman
- County: Qaleh Ganj
- District: Chah Dadkhoda

Population (2016)
  - Total: 1,275
- Time zone: UTC+3:30 (IRST)

Chah Dadkhoda (Persian: چاه دادخدا) is a city in, and the capital of, Chah Dadkhoda District of Qaleh Ganj County, Kerman province, Iran. It also serves as the administrative center for Chah Dadkhoda Rural District.

== Demographics ==
=== Population ===
At the time of the 2006 National Census, Chah Dadkhoda's population was 1,172 in 253 households, when it was a village in Chah Dadkhoda Rural District. The following census in 2011 counted 1,492 people in 316 households. The 2016 census measured the population of the village as 1,275 people in 306 households.

Chah Dadkhoda was elevated to the status of a city in 2017.
