= Qal'eh Dokhtar, Kerman =

Clay castle in Kerman, Iran

Qal'eh Dokhtar
- قلعه دختر
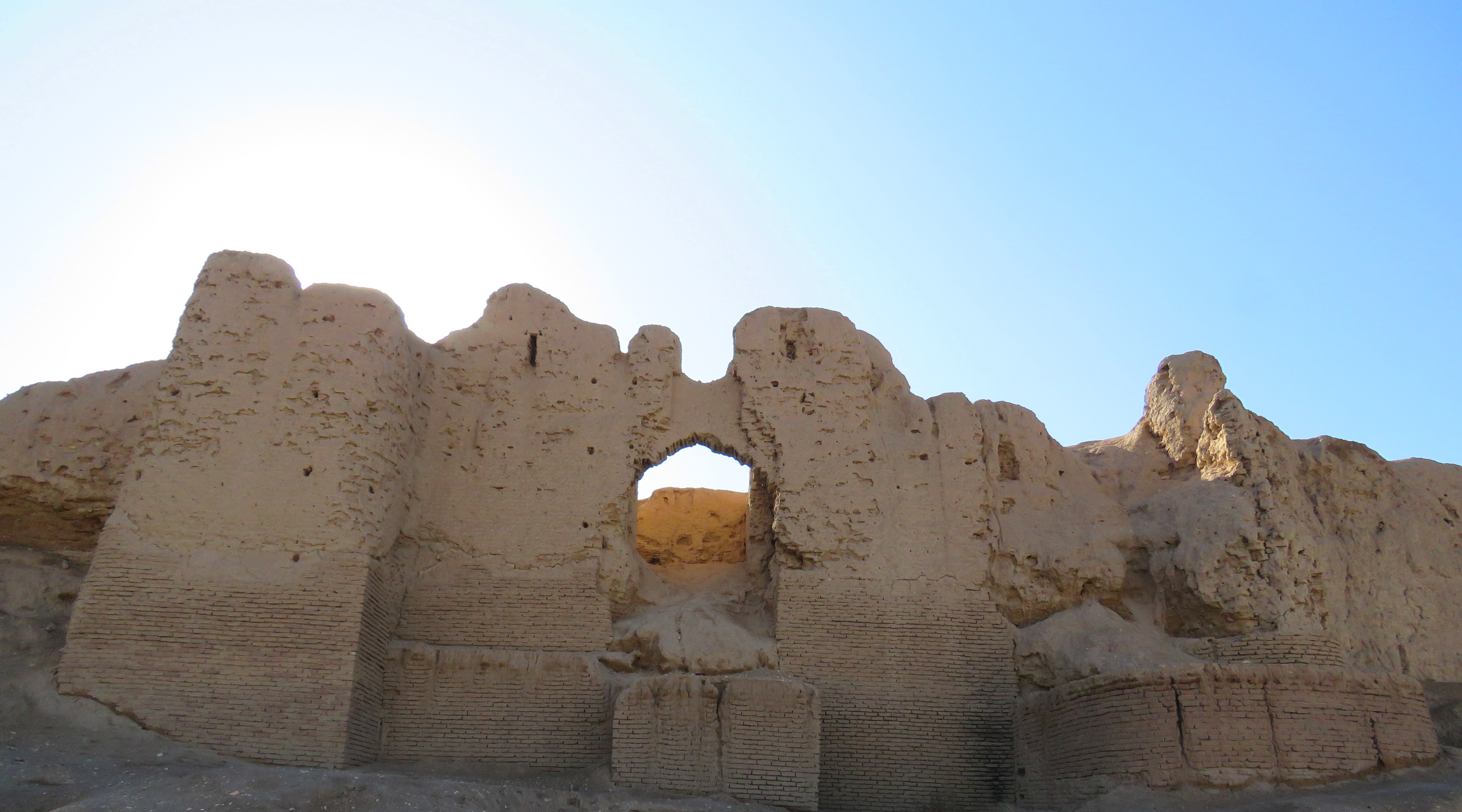
- The main gate, December 2020
- Former names: Mountain Castle
- Alternative names: Maiden Castle

General information
- Status: Ruined
- Location: Kerman, Iran
- Year built: Around 2,500 years ago

Technical details
- Material: Clay and adobe

Iran National Heritage List
- Official name: Maiden Castle
- Type: Ruins
- Designated: 1966
- Reference no.: 519
- Conservation organization: Cultural Heritage, Handicrafts and Tourism Organization of Iran

Qal'eh Dokhtar (Persian: قلعه دختر) is a castle in Kerman, Iran. The castle was built sometime during the Median rule over Iran, making it over 2,500 years old. During the Seljuk period, the castle was considered a refuge for the people of Kerman city. Today it is a historical site of Kerman province, the castle is in ruins.

The castle is only built from clay and adobe. Remains of three stories of the main structure, now partially ruined, are still visible on the eastern side. The main gate is situated on the western side, fronted by a staircase that was once seemingly connected to the fortress by a drawbridge. Several towers with both square and circular plans form part of the enclosing walls.

== Gallery ==
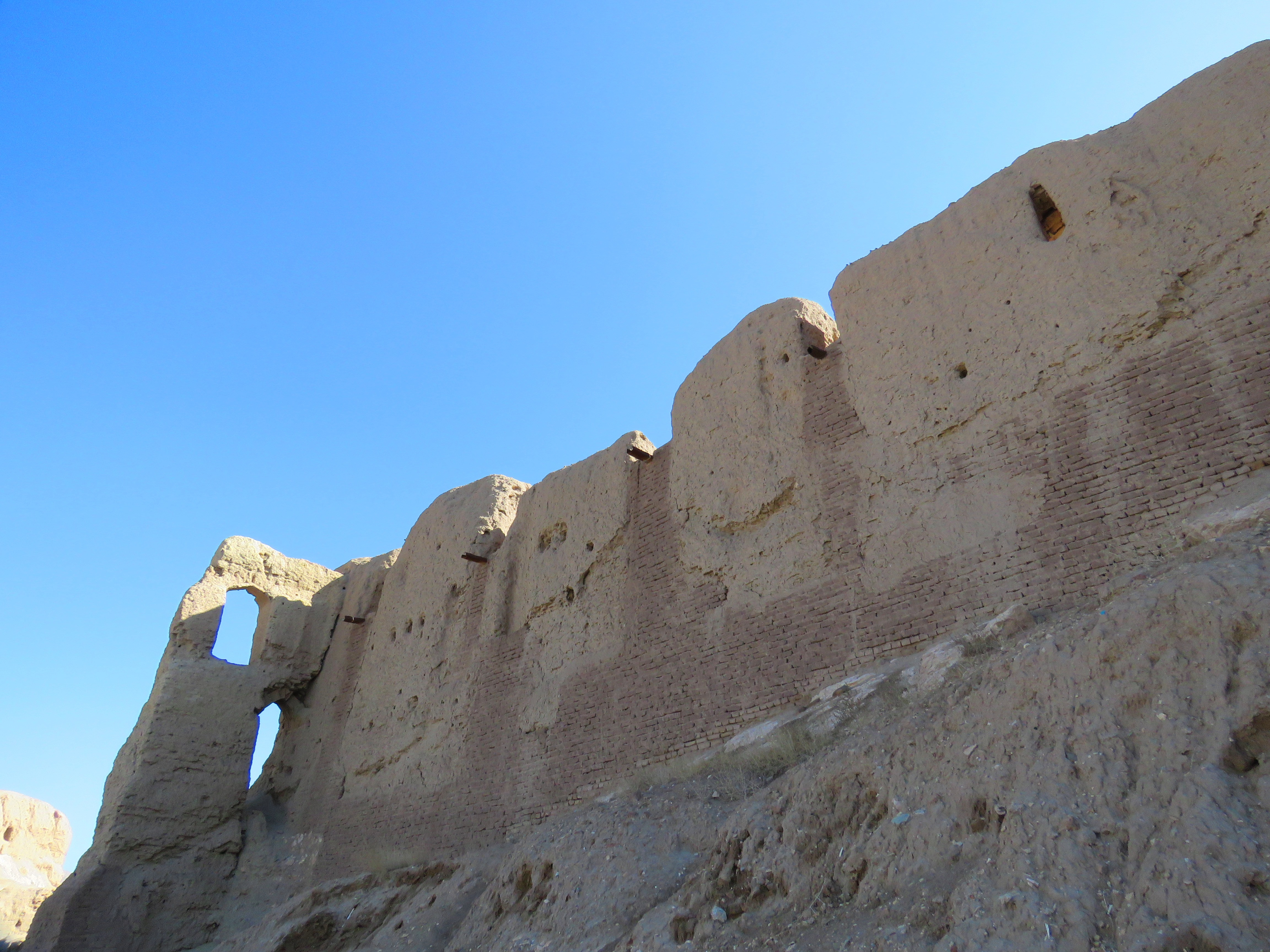

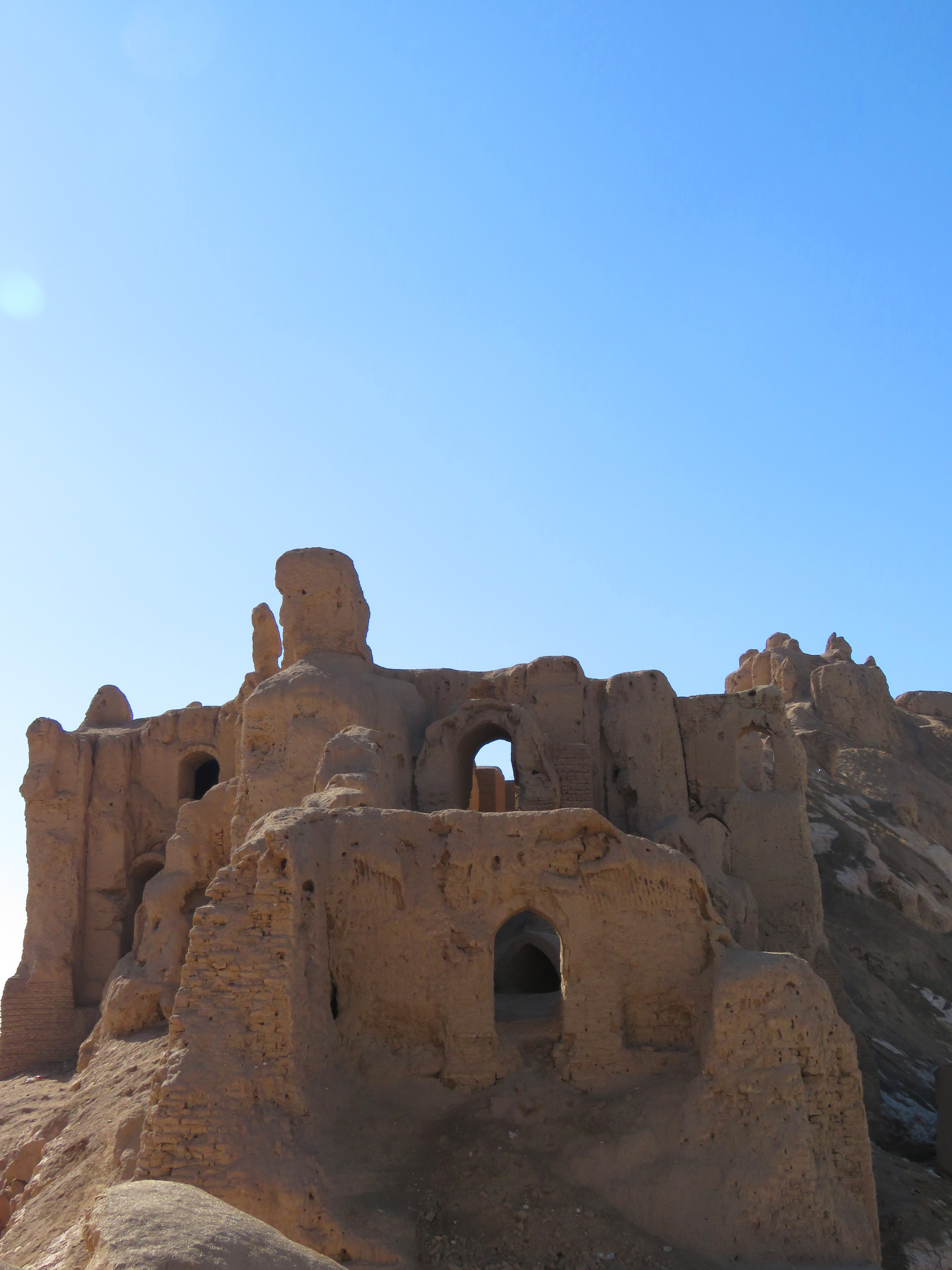

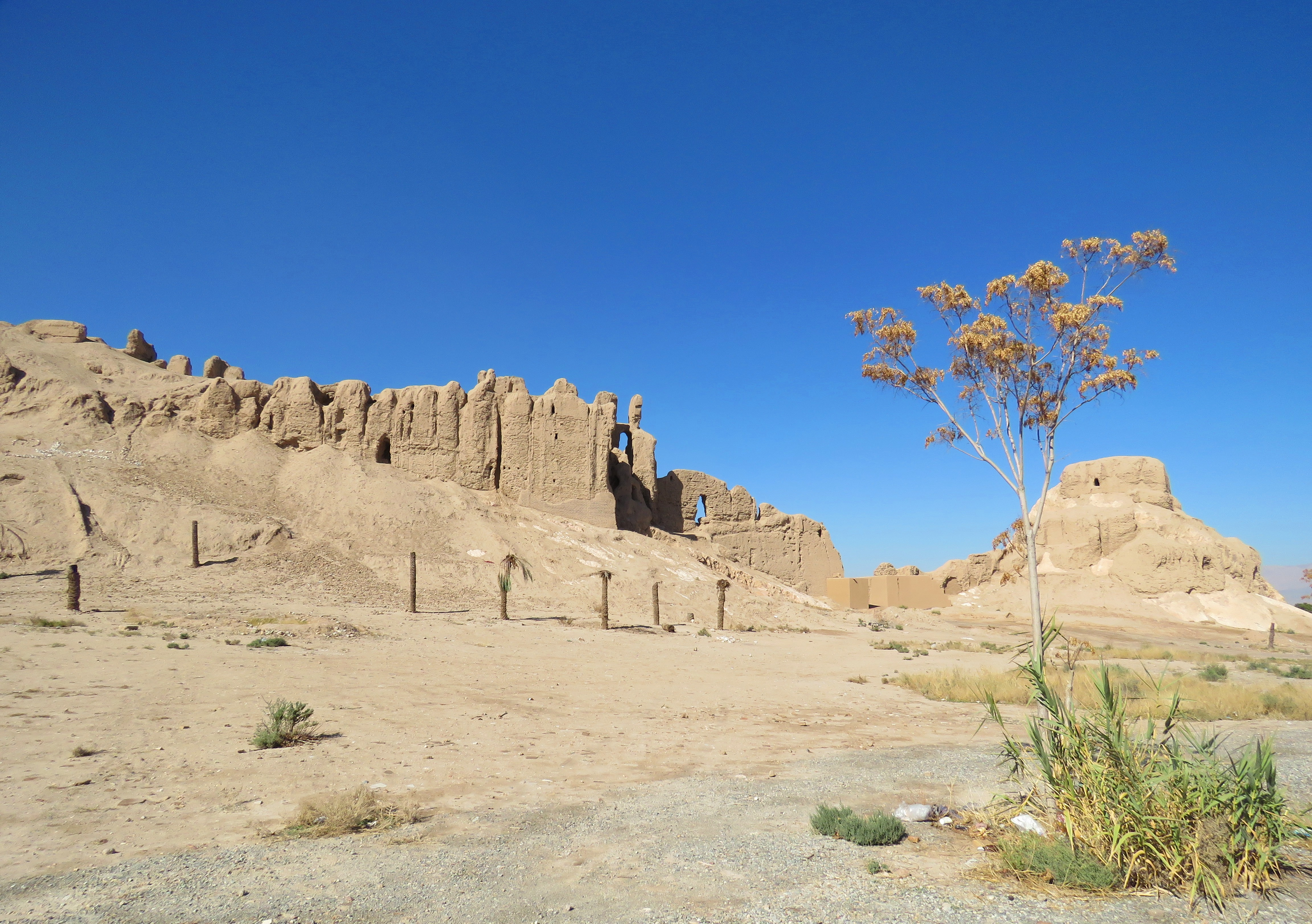

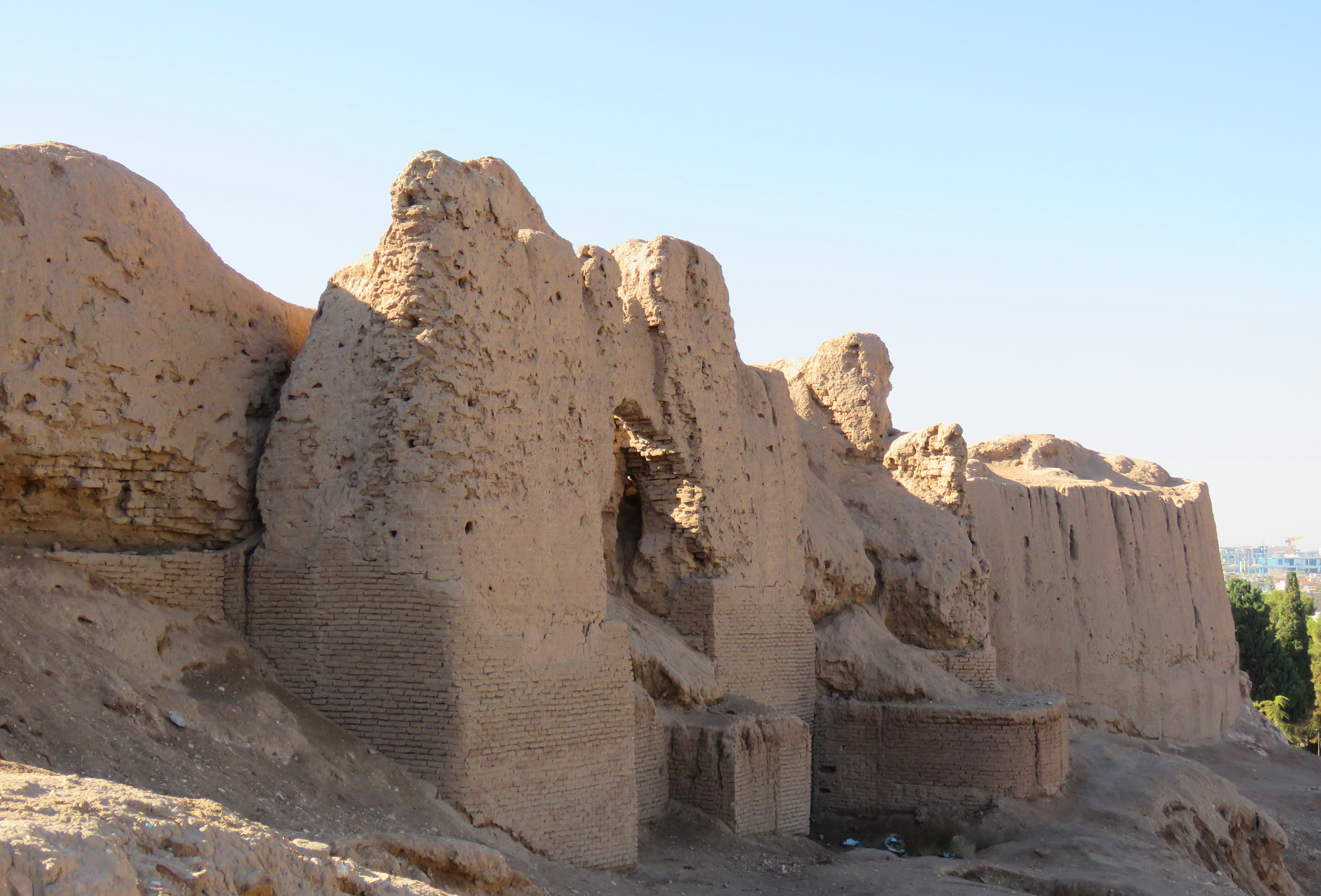

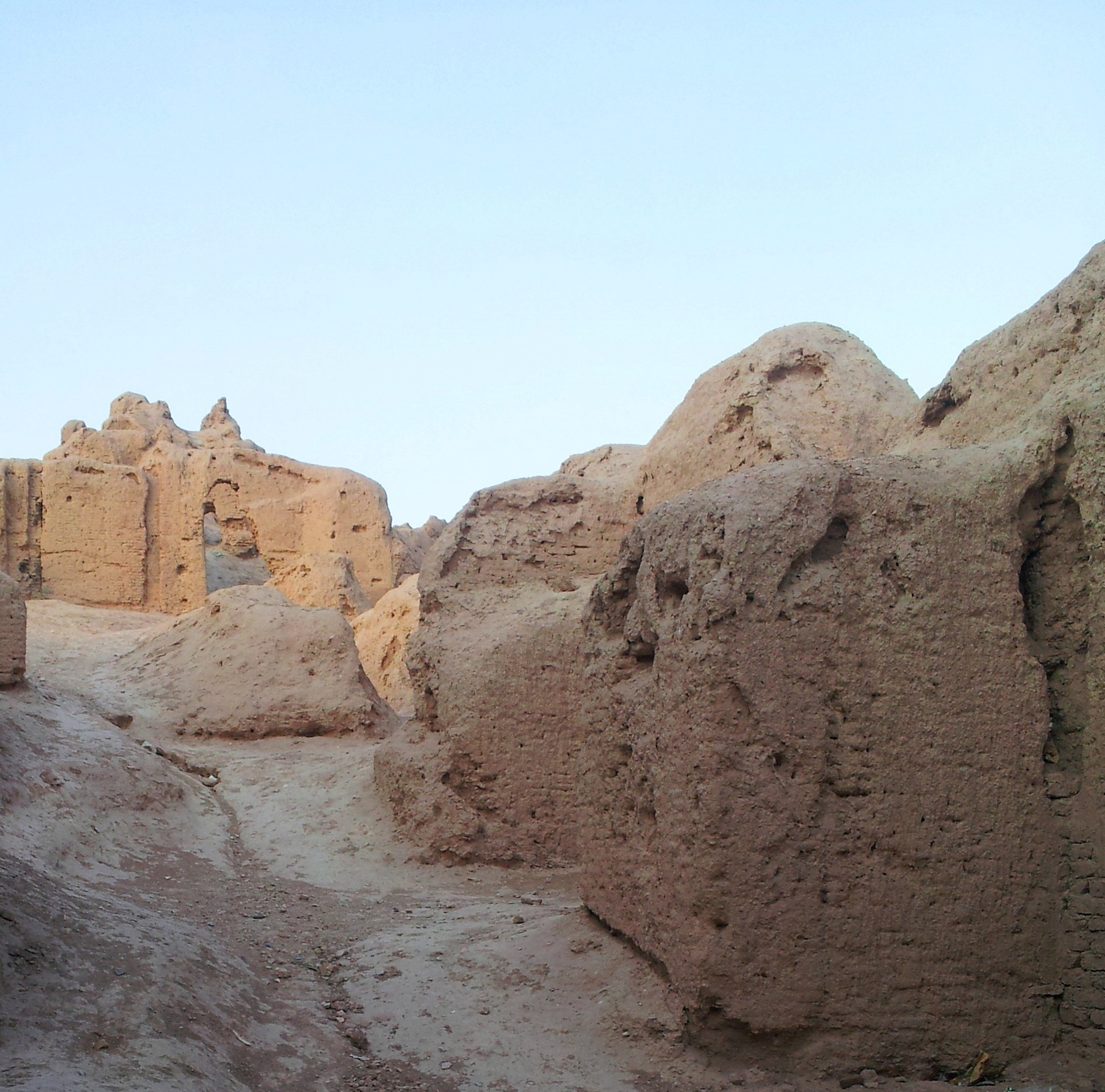

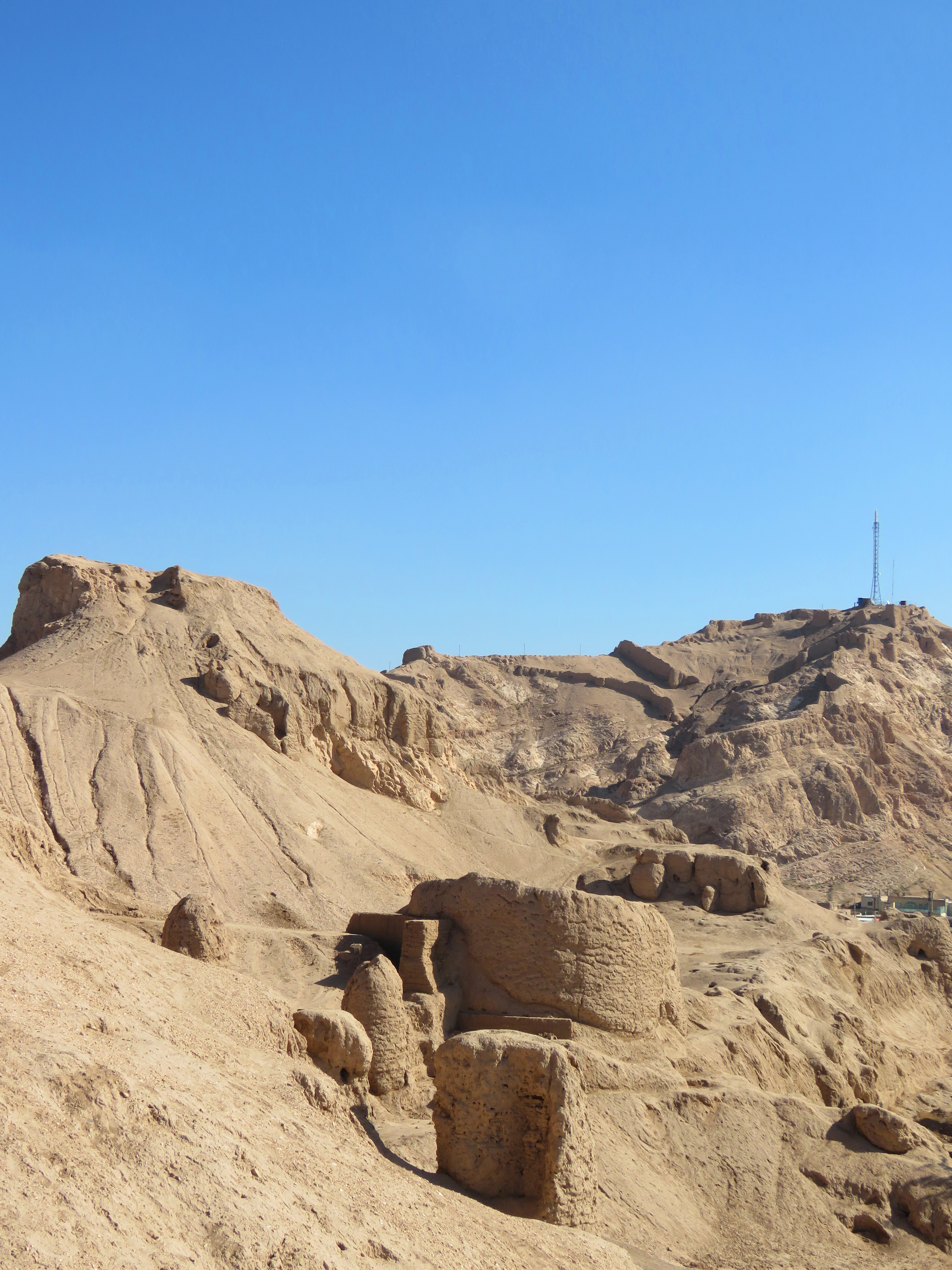

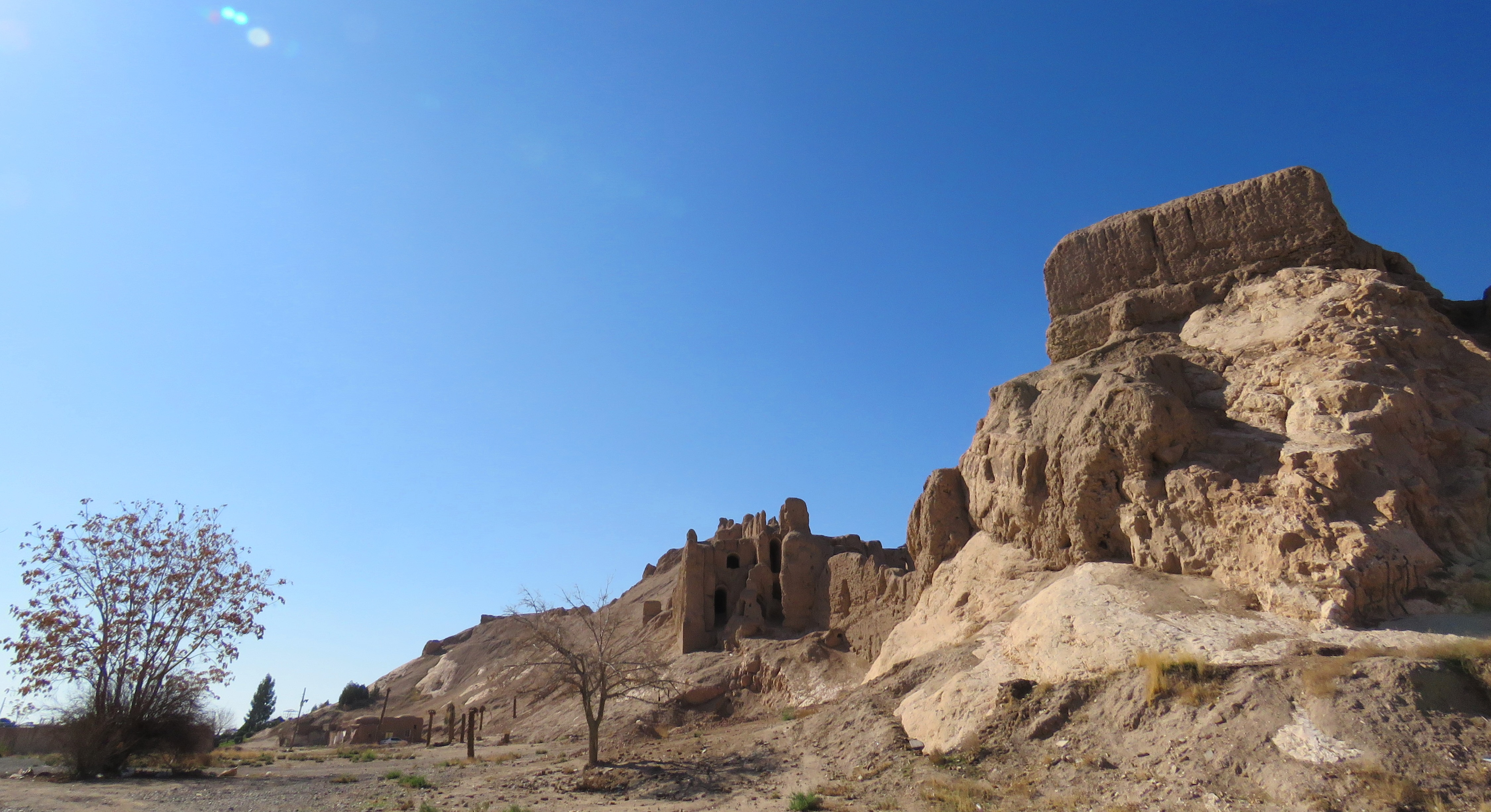

== See also ==
- List of castles in Iran
