= Zardeyn =

Village in Yazd province, Iran

Zardeyn Persian: زردين
- Village
- Location within Iran
- Coordinates: 31°26′32″N 54°14′07″E
- Country: Iran
- Province: Yazd
- County: Taft
- District: Nir
- Rural District: Zardeyn

Population (2016)
  - Total: 556
- Time zone: UTC+3:30 (IRST)

Zardeyn (Persian: زردين) (Note: Also romanized as Zardīn; also known as Zard Deh and Zardan) is a village in, and the capital of, Zardeyn Rural District (Note: Formerly Poshtkuh Rural District) of Nir District, Taft County, Yazd province, Iran.

== Demographics ==
=== Population ===
At the time of the 2006 National Census, the village's population was 767 in 236 households. The following census in 2011 counted 590 people in 208 households. The 2016 census measured the population of the village as 556 people in 210 households. It was the most populous village in its rural district.

== Sports ==
The people of Zardeyn, especially the youth, always support the sports competitions. Because of having a sports hall, this village hosts the sports competitions of Zardeyn Rural District and every year the futsal and volleyball competitions of this district in Zardeyn sports hall take place.

Among the futsal teams of this village are Shahid Chamran and Zardeyn City teams. Shahid Chamran team has a history of winning the futsal cup of Zardeyn Rural District and is always one of the contenders for this cup.

The Zardeyn City team had managed to win the championship in its second year of participation in the Martyrs' Cup of Zardeyn.

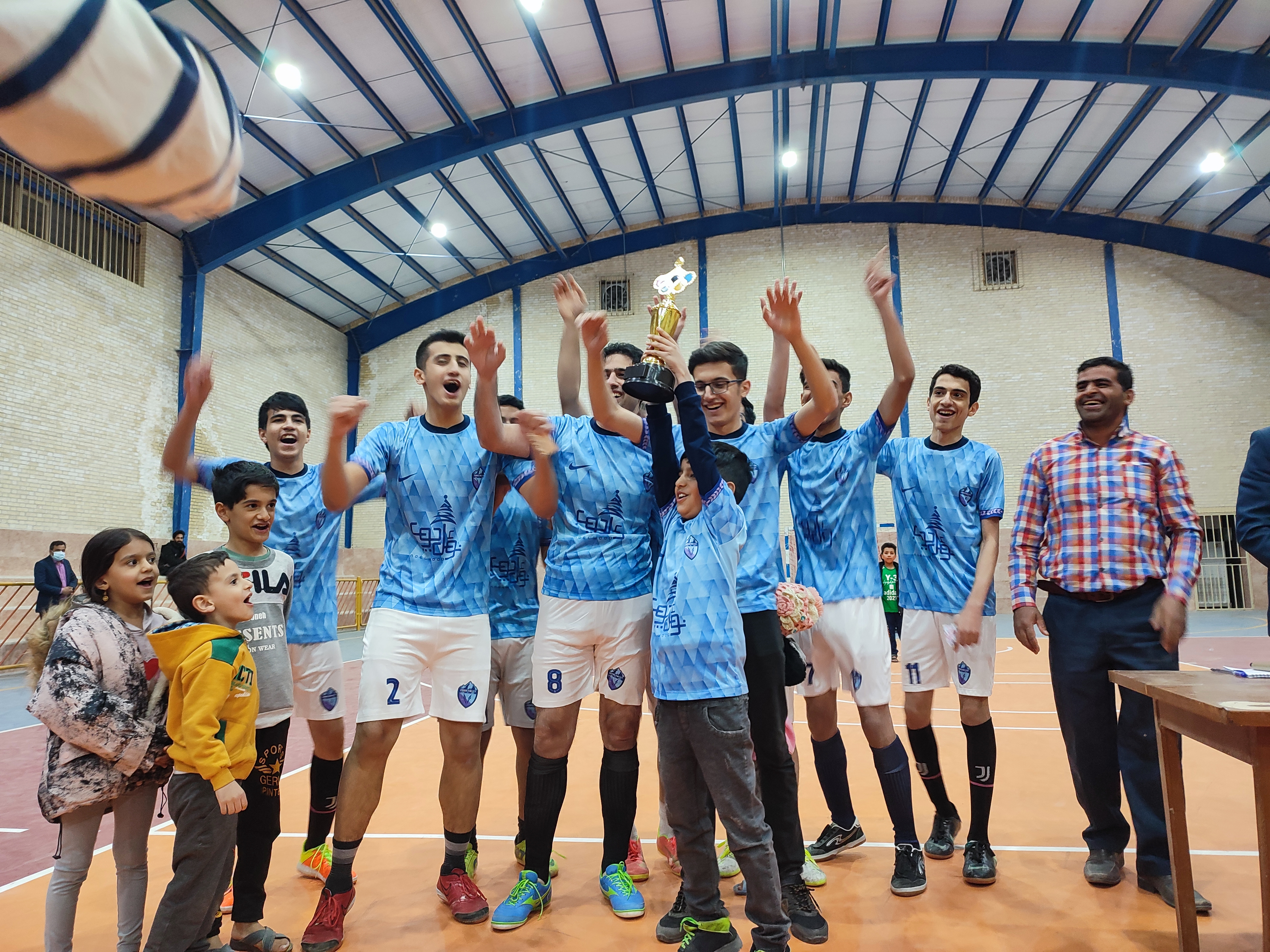
Zardeyn City team's championship in the 1402 Zardeyn Martyrs' Cup

Zardeyn City team players in Zardeyn Martyrs Cup 1402:

Mohammad Sadegh Zare Zardeyni - Hossein Zare Zardeyni - Mohammad Mahdi Zare Zardeyni - Ehsan Zare Zardeyni - Habib Zare Zardeyni - Ali Zare Zardeyni - Mohammad Zare Zardeyni - Mohammad Hadi Zare Zardeyni - Mohammad Reza Zare Zardeyni - Erfan Zare Zardeyni.
