= Baghak, Khash =

Baghak باغك
- Village
- Location within Iran
- Coordinates: 27°34′26″N 61°07′54″E
- Country: Iran
- Province: Sistan and Baluchestan
- County: Khash
- Bakhsh: Irandegan
- Rural District: Kahnuk

Population (2006)
  - Total: 219
- Time zone: UTC+3:30 (IRST)
  - Summer (DST): UTC+4:30 (IRDT)

Baghak (Persian: باغك, also Romanized as Bāghak; also known as Bāgak and Bāghūk) is a village in Kahnuk Rural District, Irandegan District, Khash County, Sistan and Baluchestan Province, Iran. At the 2006 census, its population was 219, in 54 families.
