= Zohan =

City in South Khorasan province, Iran

Zohan Persian: زهان
- City
- Location within Iran
- Coordinates: 33°25′20″N 59°48′43″E
- Country: Iran
- Province: South Khorasan
- County: Zirkuh
- District: Zohan
- Established as a city: 2004

Population (2016)
  - Total: 1,118
- Time zone: UTC+3:30 (IRST)

Zohan (Persian: زهان) (Note: Also romanized as Zohān; also known as Zihūn) is a city in, and the capital of, Zohan District in Zirkuh County, South Khorasan province, Iran. It also serves as the administrative center for Zohan Rural District. The village of Zohan was converted to a city in 2004.

== Demographics ==
=== Population ===
At the time of the 2006 National Census, the city's population was 707 in 233 households, when it was in Qaen County. The following census in 2011 counted 1,419 people in 285 households. The 2016 census measured the population of the city as 1,118 people in 290 households, by which time the district had been separated from the county in the establishment of Zirkuh County.
