= Salmaniyeh, Jiroft =

Salmaniyeh سلمانيه
- Village
- Country: Iran
- Province: Kerman
- County: Jiroft
- Bakhsh: Central
- Rural District: Halil

Population (2006)
  - Total: 474
- Time zone: UTC+3:30 (IRST)
  - Summer (DST): UTC+4:30 (IRDT)

Salmaniyeh (Persian: سلمانيه, also Romanized as Salmānīyeh) is a village in Halil Rural District, in the Central District of Jiroft County, Kerman Province, Iran. At the 2006 census, its population was 474, in 102 families.
