= Baghak, Hormozgan =

Baghak باغك
- Village
- Location within Iran
- Coordinates: 27°00′19″N 57°19′04″E
- Country: Iran
- Province: Hormozgan
- County: Minab
- Bakhsh: Central
- Rural District: Karian

Population (2006)
  - Total: 64
- Time zone: UTC+3:30 (IRST)
  - Summer (DST): UTC+4:30 (IRDT)

Baghak (Persian: باغك, also romanized as Bāghak) is a village in Karian Rural District, in the Central District of Minab County, Hormozgan Province, Iran. At the 2006 census, its population was 64, in 15 families.
