= Baghak-e Sofla =

Village in Razavi Khorasan, Iran

Baghak-e Sofla باغك سفلي
- Village
- Location within Iran
- Coordinates: 35°25′40″N 60°50′48″E
- Country: Iran
- Province: Razavi Khorasan
- County: Torbat-e Jam
- Bakhsh: Central
- Rural District: Jamrud

Population (2006)
  - Total: 231
- Time zone: UTC+3:30 (IRST)
  - Summer (DST): UTC+4:30 (IRDT)

Baghak-e Sofla (Persian: باغك سفلي, also Romanized as Bāghak-e Soflá; also known as Bāghak) is a village in Jamrud Rural District, in the Central District of Torbat-e Jam County, Razavi Khorasan Province, Iran. At the 2006 census, its population was 231, in 45 families.

== See also ==
- List of cities, towns and villages in Razavi Khorasan Province
