= Hoori Noorani =

Pakistani classical dancer, artist and publisher

- Education: Masters in Philology
- Alma mater: People's Friendship university
- Organization: Maktab-e-Danyal

Hoori Noorani is a Pakistani classical dancer, artist and publisher. She is the owner of Pakistan's well known publishing house, Maktab-e-Danyal that has published the works of renowned authors, including Mushtaq Ahmed Yousufi, Faiz Ahmed Faiz, Fahmida Riaz, and Habib Jalib.

== Background ==
Hoori was born in Karachi and belonged from an upper-class family. Her family migrated to Karachi after the Partition of India. Her father, Malik Noorani, established Maktaba-e-Danyal, a publishing house that has a high reputation in Pakistan. He also founded Pakistan Law House which has material related to law. Hoori's mother, Mumtaz Noorani, was president of the Pakistan Democratic Women's Association (PDWA). Both of Hoori Noorani's parents were members of communist political groups. Hoori's house was located on Qasr-e-Zainab on Club Road and was visited by many of Pakistan's well known writers. This early exposure inculcated an interest in political activity for Hoori.

Hoori did her A-levels from the Karachi Grammar School (KGS) in 1976. She then went to Moscow for her higher studies. In 1983, she graduated from People's Friendship University, Moscow, with a master's degree in Philology with major in Russian and World Literature.

Hoori is married to Nadeem Khalid, an entrepreneur. The couple has two children.

== Career ==
Hoori had great interest in Russian literature and was inspired by the classical Russian literature. Hoori was also fluent in Russian language and taught it at the Friendship House, Karachi, after she returned home from Moscow. She later joined her father's publishing house. When Hoori's father became ill, he started taking Hoori to Maktaba-e-Danyal to train her. In 1986, he died and, Hoori took over the Publishing house and bookshop.

Hoori learnt classical dance at the age of six, from the well known dancer Ghanshyam. She also took classes from Sheema Kirmani, another reputable dancer in the country. Hoori worked with the theatre for many years. She was also part of Dastak, a group that performed Galileo and had become famous in Pakistan in the 1980s.Her translation was used for performances by Dastak.

Hoori also translated Henry Borvik's Interview in Buenos Aires from Russian to Urdu. She is working on more projects that involve publishing translations at Maktaba-e-Danyal. Translations of French and Russian literature have been published including works of Milan Kundera and Tahar Ben Jelloun. The press is also publishing Urdu translations of modern English novels written by Pakistani writers.

Hoori is also part of local literature societies and is invited on literature conferences and seminars. She is also a part of the civil society groups in Pakistan.

In March 2020, Maktaba-e-Daniyal was shortlisted for the Prix Voltaire by the International Publishers Association.

=== Government Raid ===
Maktab-e-Danyal was raided by some unknown men claiming to be from Pakistan's Inter-Services Intelligence agency. They confiscated 250 copies of the Urdu translation of Mohammed Hanif's book, A Case of exploding mangoes and also demanded to know names of other bookshops selling the copies, according to Hanif and the book's translator, Syed Kashif Raza. They also said that the men returned the next day to take lists of book shops that are selling Hanif's novel. The novel had been translated and published by Maktab-e-Danyal in 2019 and was selling well at literary festivals. As Hoori was preparing for a second edition, she received a legal notice from former President Zia-Ul-Haq's son, for defamation of his father. Before Hoori could get legal assistance, Maktab-e-Danyal's office was raided, and the books were confiscated. The incident has been condemned by Amnesty International and the Human Rights Commission of Pakistan. The incident has been featured in both local and international media like BBC and The Guardian.
