= Suru, Estonia =

Village in Estonia

Coordinates: 59°25′N 25°48′E

Suru
- Village
- Interactive map of Suru
- Country: Estonia
- County: Harju County
- Parish: Kuusalu Parish
- Time zone: UTC+2 (EET)
  - Summer (DST): UTC+3 (EEST)

Suru is a village in Kuusalu Parish, Harju County in northern Estonia. It lies on the Valgejõgi River.

About half of the village territory, east of Valgejõgi is occupied by Keskpolügoon, the central training area of the Estonian Defence Forces.
