= Battle of Baghak =

Battle of the War in Afghanistan

Coordinates: 35.167°N 67.967°E

- Part of the War in Afghanistan
Date	4 August 2012
Location	near Dahane Baghak, Shikari Valley, Bamyan Province, Afghanistan
Result	Taliban victory

Belligerents
New Zealand; Islamic Republic of Afghanistan; United States	Taliban

Commanders and leaders
(New Zealand) Maj. Craig Wilson (WIA)	(Taliban) Haji Abdullah Gardande

Strength
(New Zealand) 60+, 6 NZLAVs (United States) 2 HH-60 Pavehawks	Unknown

Casualties and losses
(New Zealand) 2 killed, 6 wounded (Islamic Republic of Afghanistan) 4 killed, 9 wounded	(Taliban) 3-5 killed, 1 captured
- 2 civilian casualties

The Battle of Baghak was an engagement during the War in Afghanistan between elements of the New Zealand Defence Force (NZDF), the Afghan National Directorate of Security (NDS) and insurgent forces near Dahane Baghak in the Shikari Valley, Bamyan Province on 4 August 2012.

New Zealand suffered its heaviest casualties since the Vietnam War. The battle generated significant controversy in New Zealand, with accusations of a NZDF cover-up.

== Battle ==
=== Prelude ===
At 02:00 on 4 August 2012, the NDS began an operation in the village of Baghak to arrest a suspected bomb-maker. The NDS had confiscated several IEDs. At 06:00, the NDS received fire from Taliban insurgents, taking one casualty, and again at 07:30, where one NDS soldier was killed and another six were wounded. At about 08:00, Kiwi Company was informed by the NDS personnel that they had suffered a number of casualties during the operation earlier that morning. The NZDF Commanding Officer approved a request by the Officer Commanding (OC) Major Craig Wilson to deploy a three-vehicle Humvee patrol named KT4 to the scene to assist the NDS and conduct a tactical site exploitation. KT1 and KT2, which consisted of three NZLAVs each, were also deployed to support KT4.

KT4 arrived at the scene at 09:46. Lance Corporal Jacinda Baker treated the wounded NDS soldiers while they were evacuated by the New Zealand troops. One of the six wounded NDS died of his wounds at the scene. A 14-man patrol dismounted from their vehicles and began clearing a compound and the high ground surrounding the contact site. KT2 and KT4 provided overwatch to the dismounted patrol. KT1 was situated at the Dahane Baghak truckstop 500 metres to the south. The NDS also commenced their own clearance operation of the high ground at the same time.

=== Main battle ===
At 12:27, shortly after the arrival of KT3 with Major Wilson, the Taliban engaged the New Zealand patrols on the road. Upon receiving word of contact, KT1 mounted up and traveled north to the contact area. The KT1 commander, Sergeant David Duncan, did not know of the clearance operation being carried out by the patrol. KT3 also had little information of the situation prior to the engagement and did not know of the positions of KT4. The LAVs of KT2 started firing on suspected insurgent positions on the high ground and was then joined by KT1. KT1 started firing on positions occupied by the New Zealand clearance patrol, believing that the high ground was occupied by insurgents and that there were no friendlies on the high ground. Corporal Peter Page and another soldier were wounded by friendly fire from the NZLAVs in KT1. Lance Corporal Rory Malone received a wound to his right leg which was not treated. In the process of shifting the injured Major Wilson, he received a 7.62mm round (likely from an AK-47) through his left arm and left side, killing him instantly. Another NDS member was killed and three more NDS were wounded in this time. All eight New Zealand casualties occurred in the space of 12 minutes where the heaviest fighting occurred.

A casualty collection post (CCP) was established 600m south of the contact site. 20 minutes after it was established, the CCP came under fire from the Taliban.

=== Evacuation and retreat ===
Casualties were evacuated throughout the afternoon, with further smaller engagements killing one NDS soldier and wounding one other. One Afghan civilian and one Afghan National Police officer were also wounded. Most of the casualties were evacuated by two United States Air Force Sikorsky HH-60 Pave Hawks of the 83rd Expeditionary Rescue Squadron, call signs Pedro 83 and Pedro 84, from the CCP at 14:26 hours. Lance Corporal Pralli Durrer was treated in the back of a NZLAV, but later died en route to hospital in aboard Pedro 83. The last two remaining New Zealand casualties were winched off the high ground by Pedro 83 at 15:58 hours. During this sequence, Pedro 83 was engaged from about 100 meters away by 5 insurgents. Pedro 83 and Pedro 84 successfully destroyed the enemy position with approximately 600 rounds of .50 cal ammunition. At 16:05 hours, a US Navy F/A-18 Super Hornet reported seeing a group of 16 insurgents moving east away from the contact site carrying their dead and wounded.

At 19:30, the New Zealand forces regrouped at the CCP and began their withdrawal back to Forward Patrol Base Do Abe and Company Outpost Romeo. They arrived back at 04:30 hours 5 August 2012.

== Aftermath ==
On 5 August 2012 (NZ time), New Zealand Prime Minister John Key expressed his "enormous sadness" at the loss of the two New Zealand soldiers.

=== Awards ===
The crews of Pedro 83 and Pedro 84 were awarded the Distinguished Flying Cross with Valor device for their actions. Seven New Zealand soldiers were recommended for gallantry awards. Lance Corporal Rory Malone and Lance Corporal John Luamanu were awarded the New Zealand Gallantry Medal (Malone posthumously), Sergeant David Duncan was awarded the New Zealand Gallantry Decoration, and Staff Sergeant Rob McGee was awarded the New Zealand Distinguished Service Decoration. Private James Baldwin was awarded a Chief of Defence Force Commendation for Gallantry for his actions.

=== Court of Inquiry ===
Chief of Defence Force Lieutenant General Rhys Jones released the interim findings of the Court of Inquiry on 25 April 2013. Lieutenant General Jones said that he did so to avoid "mis-information and rumour taking the place of facts". The Court of Inquiry was not able to visit the site of the battle due to operational limitations and security concerns, however a US Army UH-60 helicopter later conducted a flyover of the site of the battle. The Court of Inquiry did not interview any of the Afghan soldiers present at the battle.
