= Afin Rural District =

Rural district in South Khorasan province, Iran

Afin Rural District Persian: دهستان افين
- Rural District
- Location within Iran
- Coordinates: 33°34′N 59°38′E
- Country: Iran
- Province: South Khorasan
- County: Zirkuh
- District: Zohan
- Established: 2002
- Capital: Afin

Population (2016)
  - Total: 4,699
- Time zone: UTC+3:30 (IRST)

Afin Rural District (Persian: دهستان افين) is in Zohan District of Zirkuh County, South Khorasan province, Iran. Its capital is the village of Afin.

== Demographics ==
=== Population ===
At the time of the 2006 National Census, the rural district's population (as a part of Qaen County) was 5,311 in 1,412 households. There were 4,760 inhabitants in 1,494 households at the following census of 2011. The 2016 census measured the population of the rural district as 4,699 in 1,451 households, by which time the district had been separated from the county in the establishment of Zirkuh County. The most populous of its 26 villages was Afin, with 1,215 people.

=== Other villages in the rural district ===
- Abbasabad
- Hoseynabad
- Kabudan
- Shahrak-e Sindar
- Shir Khond
- Zardan
