= Zohan Rural District =

Rural district in South Khorasan province, Iran

Zohan Rural District Persian: دهستان زهان
- Rural District
- Location within Iran
- Coordinates: 33°23′N 59°48′E
- Country: Iran
- Province: South Khorasan
- County: Zirkuh
- District: Zohan
- Established: 1986
- Capital: Zohan

Population (2016)
  - Total: 5,135
- Time zone: UTC+3:30 (IRST)

Zohan Rural District (Persian: دهستان زهان) is in Zohan District of Zirkuh County, South Khorasan province, Iran. It is administered from the city of Zohan.

== Demographics ==
=== Population ===
At the time of the 2006 National Census, the rural district's population (as a part of Qaen County) was 5,908 in 1,505 households. There were 5,058 inhabitants in 1,431 households at the following census of 2011. The 2016 census measured the population of the rural district as 5,135 in 1,569 households, by which time the district had been separated from the county in the establishment of Zirkuh County. The most populous of its 16 villages was Shirk-e Sorjeh, with 1,115 people.

=== Other villages in the rural district ===
- Fakhran
- Jan Ahmad
- Kalateh-ye Mazar
- Pardan
- Payehan
- Sarjin
