= Rameshk Rural District =

Rural district in Kerman province, Iran

Rameshk Rural District Persian: دهستان رمشك
- Rural District
- Location within Iran
- Coordinates: 26°47′49″N 58°46′24″E
- Country: Iran
- Province: Kerman
- County: Qaleh Ganj
- District: Chah Dadkhoda
- Capital: Kangaru

Population (2016)
  - Total: 10,039
- Time zone: UTC+3:30 (IRST)

Rameshk Rural District (Persian: دهستان رمشك) is in Chah Dadkhoda District of Qaleh Ganj County, Kerman province, Iran. Its capital is the village of Kangaru. The previous capital of the rural district was the village of Rameshk, now a city.

== Demographics ==
=== Population ===
At the time of the 2006 National Census, the rural district's population was 8,957 in 2,016 households. There were 9,929 inhabitants in 2,440 households at the following census of 2011. The 2016 census measured the population of the rural district as 10,039 in 2,533 households. The most populous of its 77 villages was Rameshk (now a city), with 417 people.
