= Zohan District =

District in South Khorasan province, Iran

Zohan District Persian: بخش زهان
- District
- Location within Iran
- Coordinates: 33°30′N 59°42′E
- Country: Iran
- Province: South Khorasan
- County: Zirkuh
- Established: 2002
- Capital: Zohan

Population (2016)
  - Total: 10,952
- Time zone: UTC+3:30 (IRST)

Zohan District (Persian: بخش زهان) is in Zirkuh County, South Khorasan province, Iran. Its capital is the city of Zohan.

== History ==
In 2011, Zohan District was separated from Qaen County in the establishment of Zirkuh County, which was divided into three districts of two rural districts each, with Hajjiabad as its capital.

== Demographics ==
=== Population ===
At the time of the 2006 National Census, the district's population (as a part of Qaen County) was 11,926 in 3,150 households. The following census in 2011 counted 11,237 people in 3,210 households. The 2016 census measured the population of the district as 10,952 inhabitants in 3,310 households, by which time it had been separated from the county in the establishment of Zirkuh County.

=== Administrative divisions ===
Zohan District Population (Note: As a part of Qaen County at the 2006 and 2011 censuses)
Administrative Divisions	2006	2011	2016
Afin RD	5,311	4,760	4,699
Zohan RD	5,908	5,058	5,135
Zohan (city)	707	1,419	1,118
Total	11,926	11,237	10,952
RD = Rural District
