= Chah Dadkhoda Rural District =

Rural district in Kerman province, Iran

Chah Dadkhoda Rural District Persian: دهستان چاه دادخدا
- Rural District
- Location within Iran
- Coordinates: 27°20′27″N 58°26′20″E
- Country: Iran
- Province: Kerman
- County: Qaleh Ganj
- District: Chah Dadkhoda
- Capital: Chah Dadkhoda

Population (2016)
  - Total: 12,968
- Time zone: UTC+3:30 (IRST)

Chah Dadkhoda Rural District (Persian: دهستان چاه دادخدا) is in Chah Dadkhoda District of Qaleh Ganj County, Kerman province, Iran. It is administered from the city of Chah Dadkhoda.

== Demographics ==
=== Population ===
At the time of the 2006 National Census, the rural district's population was 11,979 in 2,517 households. There were 13,443 inhabitants in 3,056 households at the following census of 2011. The 2016 census measured the population of the rural district as 12,968 in 3,285 households. The most populous of its 54 villages was Rustai-ye Chadranshin Owrtin, with 1,340 people.
