= Marz Rural District =

Rural district in Kerman province, Iran

Marz Rural District Persian: دهستان مارز
- Rural District
- Location within Iran
- Coordinates: 26°55′23″N 58°12′17″E
- Country: Iran
- Province: Kerman
- County: Qaleh Ganj
- District: Chah Dadkhoda
- Capital: Rain Qaleh

Population (2016)
  - Total: 2,533
- Time zone: UTC+3:30 (IRST)

Marz Rural District (Persian: دهستان مارز) is in Chah Dadkhoda District of Qaleh Ganj County, Kerman province, Iran. Its capital is the village of Rain Qaleh.

== Demographics ==
=== Population ===
At the time of the 2006 National Census, the rural district's population was 2,705 in 578 households. There were 3,100 inhabitants in 663 households at the following census of 2011. The 2016 census measured the population of the rural district as 2,533 in 701 households. The most populous of its 65 villages was Rain Qaleh, with 565 people.
