= Qaleh Ganj County =

County in Kerman province, Iran

Qaleh Ganj County Persian: شهرستان قلعه گنج
- County
- Location of Qaleh Ganj County in Kerman province (bottom, purple)

- Location of Kerman province in Iran
- Coordinates: 27°14′N 58°26′E
- Country: Iran
- Province: Kerman
- Capital: Qaleh Ganj
- Districts: Central, Chah Dadkhoda, Sorkh Qaleh

Population (2016)
  - Total: 76,495
- Time zone: UTC+3:30 (IRST)

Qaleh Ganj County (Persian: شهرستان قلعه گنج) is in Kerman province, Iran. Its capital is the city of Qaleh Ganj.

== History ==
After the 2016 National Census, the villages of Chah Dadkhoda and Rameshk were elevated to city status. Dulab Rural District was created in the Central District, and Sorkh Qaleh Rural District was separated from it in the formation of Sorkh Qaleh District, including the new Chehel Mani Rural District.

== Demographics ==
=== Population ===
At the time of the 2006 census, the county's population was 69,008 in 14,649 households. The following census in 2011 counted 76,376 people in 18,577 households. The 2016 census measured the population of the county as 76,495 in 20,521 households.

=== Administrative divisions ===
Qaleh Ganj County's population history and administrative structure over three consecutive censuses are shown in the following table.

Qaleh Ganj County Population
Administrative Divisions	2006	2011	2016
Central District	45,367	49,904	50,955
Dulab RD (Note: Established after the 2016 census)			
Qaleh Ganj RD	13,947	16,070	15,997
Sorkh Qaleh RD	19,860	21,171	21,789
Qaleh Ganj (city)	11,560	12,663	13,169
Chah Dadkhoda District	23,641	26,472	25,540
Chah Dadkhoda RD	11,979	13,443	12,968
Marz RD	2,705	3,100	2,533
Rameshk RD	8,957	9,929	10,039
Chah Dadkhoda (city) (Note: Became a city after the 2016 census)			
Rameshk (city) (Note: Became a city after the 2016 census)			
Sorkh Qaleh District			
Chehel Mani RD			
Sorkh Qaleh RD			
Total	69,008	76,376	76,495
RD = Rural District

== See also ==
Media related to Qaleh Ganj County at Wikimedia Commons
