= Chah Dadkhoda District =

District in Kerman province, Iran

Chah Dadkhoda District Persian: بخش چاه دادخدا
- District
- Location within Iran
- Coordinates: 27°04′04″N 58°26′36″E
- Country: Iran
- Province: Kerman
- County: Qaleh Ganj
- Capital: Chah Dadkhoda

Population (2016)
  - Total: 25,540
- Time zone: UTC+3:30 (IRST)

Chah Dadkhoda District (Persian: بخش چاه دادخدا) is in Qaleh Ganj County, Kerman province, Iran. Its capital is the city of Chah Dadkhoda.

The district is about 56 kilometres (35 mi) southeast of the county center and most of its people are farmers. Cereals, sesame and dates are the major crops grown in this area. The main source of irrigation is underground water, with some seasonal rivers that flow and end in Jaz-e Moryan.

== History ==
After the 2016 National Census, the villages of Chah Dadkhoda and Rameshk were elevated to city status.

== Demographics ==
=== Population ===
At the time of the 2006 census, the district's population was 23,641 in 5,111 households. The following census in 2011 counted 26,472 people in 6,159 households. The 2016 census measured the population of the district as 25,540 inhabitants in 6,519 households.

=== Administrative divisions ===
Chah Dadkhoda District Population
Administrative Divisions	2006	2011	2016
Chah Dadkhoda RD	11,979	13,443	12,968
Marz RD	2,705	3,100	2,533
Rameshk RD	8,957	9,929	10,039
Chah Dadkhoda (city) (Note: Became a city after the 2016 census)			
Rameshk (city) (Note: Became a city after the 2016 census)			
Total	23,641	26,472	25,540
RD = Rural District
