= Kasperek =

Kasperek is a Polish surname. Notable people with the surname include:

- Artur Kasperek (born 1966), Polish bassoonist
- Dick Kasperek (born 1943), American football player
- Leigh Kasperek (born 1992), Scottish cricketer
- Kazimierz J. Kasperek (1916–2008), Polish naval officer
