= Kazik =

Kazik is a diminutive of Slavic given name Kazimierz or Kazimir.

People with the name or nickname include:

- Kazik Staszewski (born 1963), also known as Kazik, Polish singer and songwriter
- Kazik Radwanski (born 1985), Canadian film director and screenwriter
- Simcha Rotem (1924–2018), nom de guerre Kazik, a member of the Jewish underground in Warsaw during World War II
- Kazimierz J. Kasperek (1916–2008), nicknamed Kazik, Polish Navy veteran of World War II
- Wanda Gertz (1896–1958), Polish Legion female soldier in World War I under the name Kazik Zuchowicz

== See also ==
- Gazik (disambiguation)
