= Ferdows Religious School =

Historic building in Iran

Coordinates: 34°0′27″N 58°9′43″E

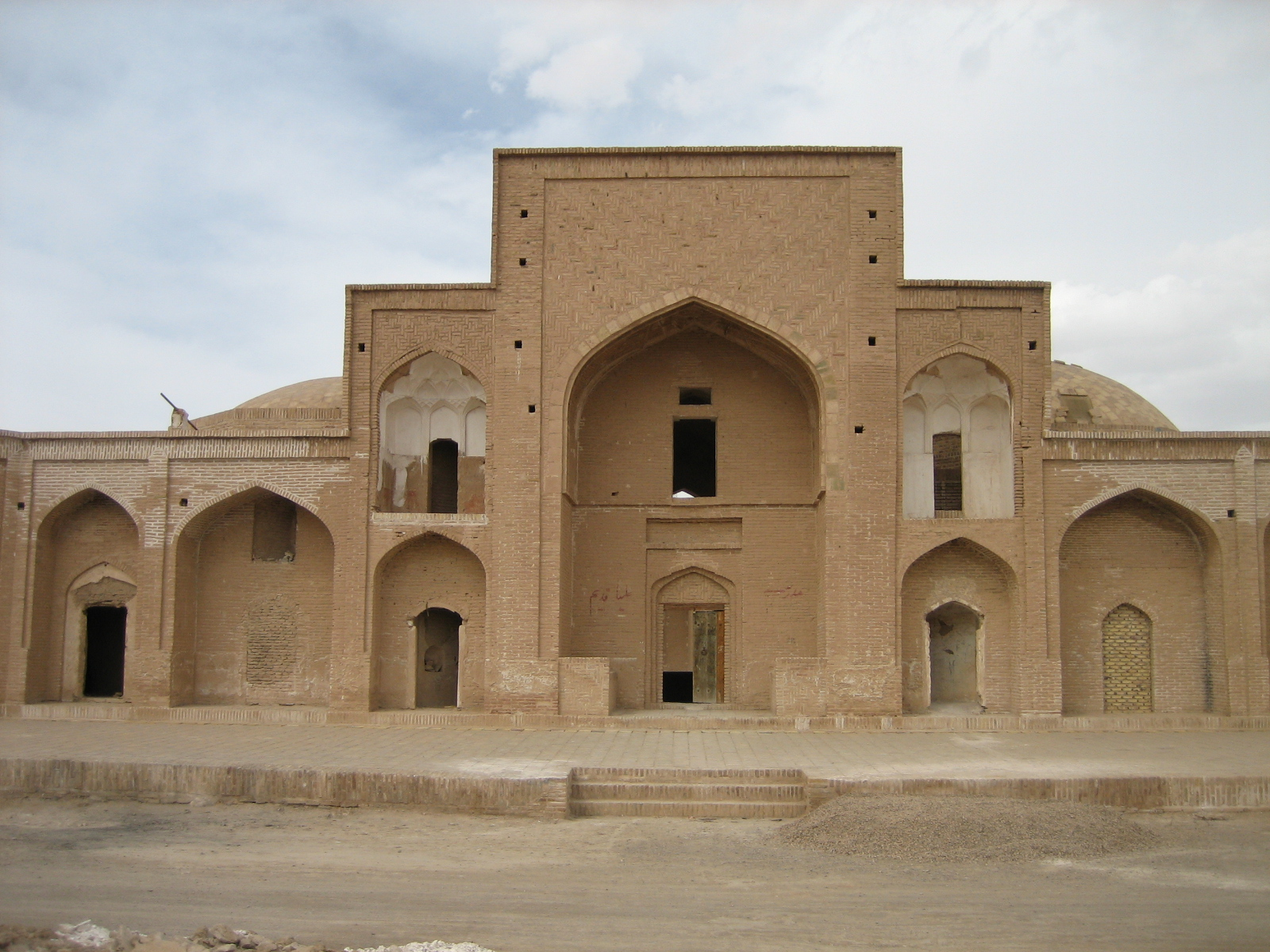
The Religious School of Ferdows, belonged to the Safavid era.

Ferdows Religious School (Persian: مدرسه علمیه علیا, romanized: Madreseh Elmiyeh Oliya) is a historic school with octagonal design, located in the southwest of Ferdows, in the center of the ancient city of Toon, in South Khorasan province, Iran. This school was built in the Safavid era with the effort of Mir Ali Beyk.

== Gallery ==
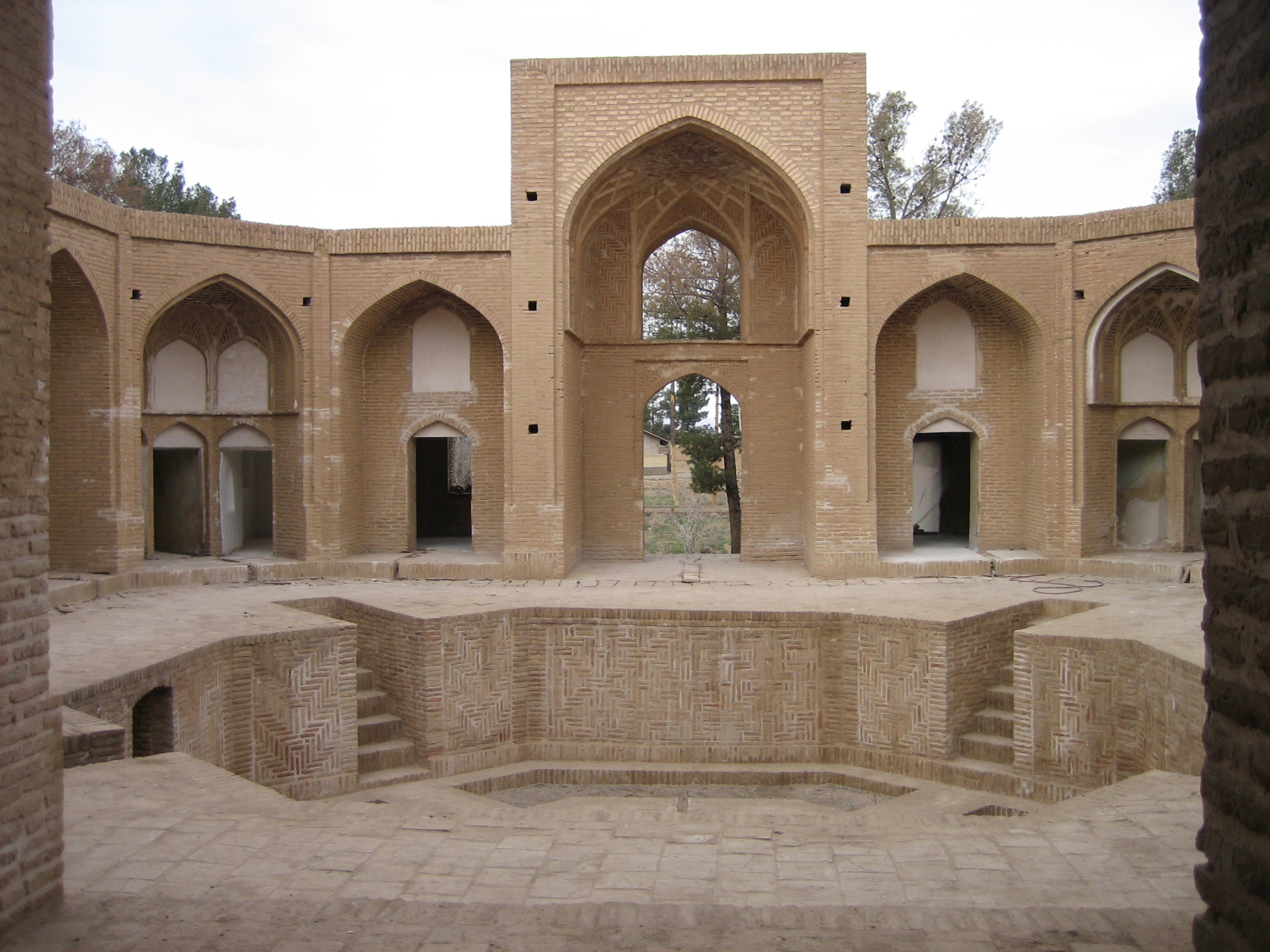

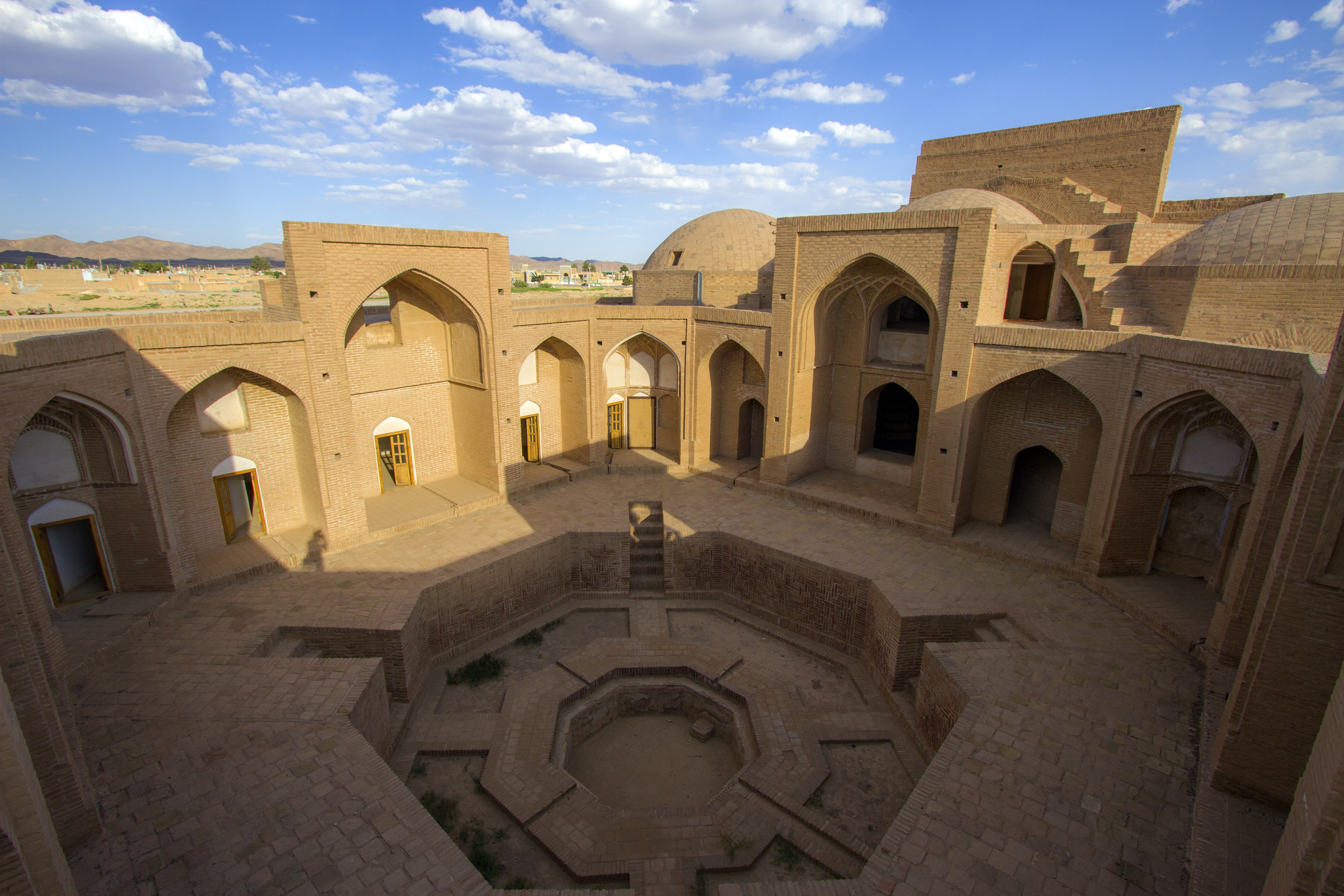

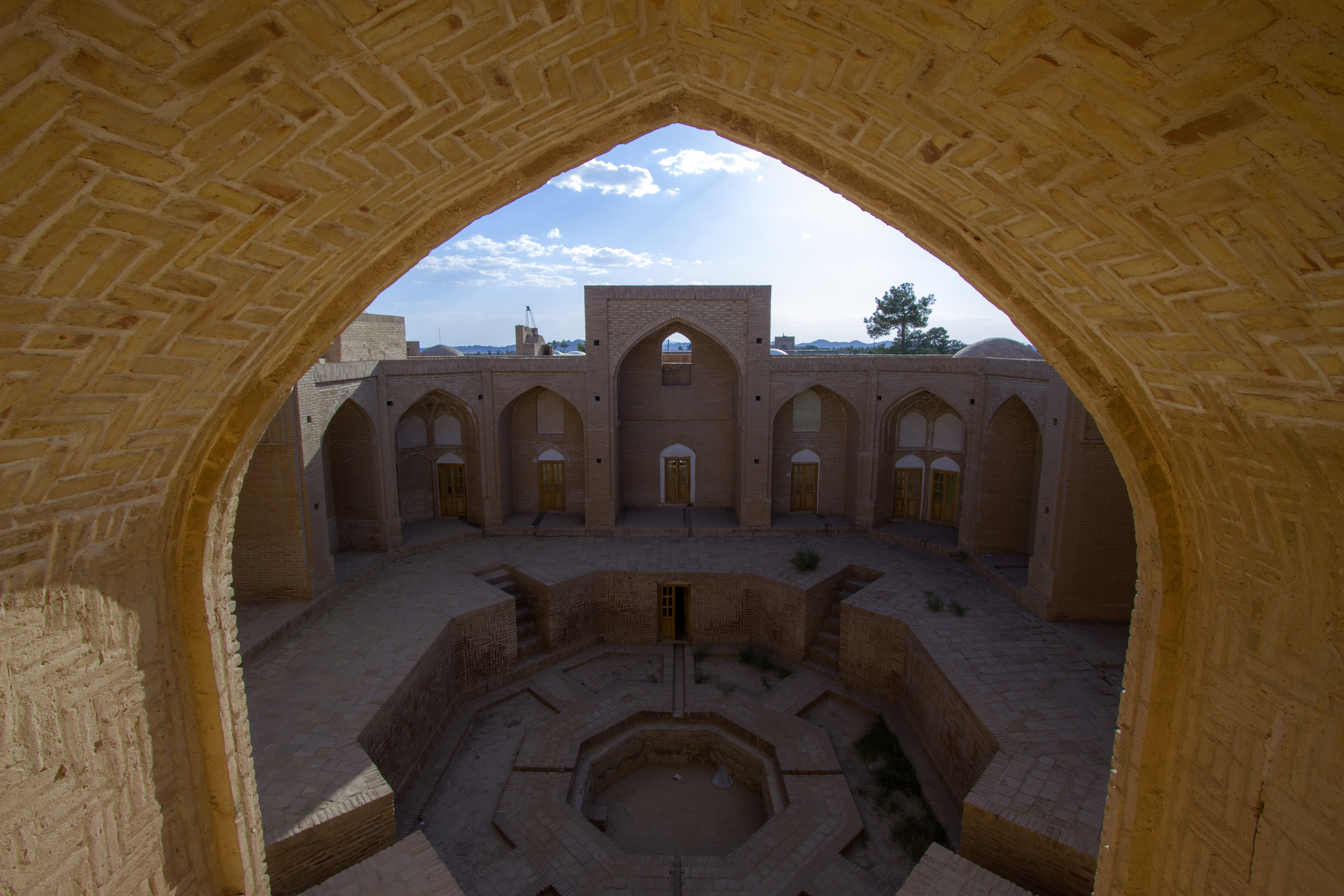

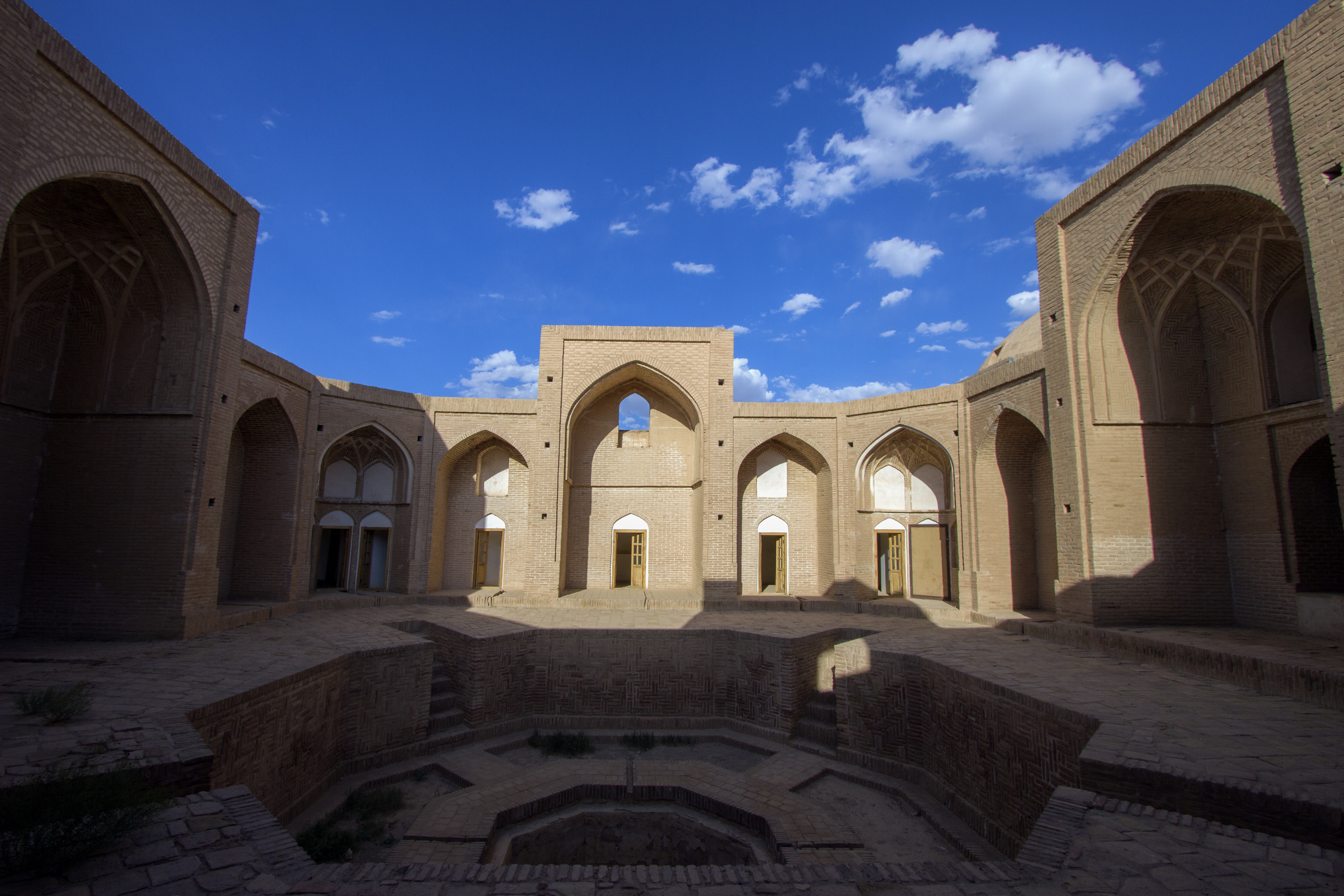

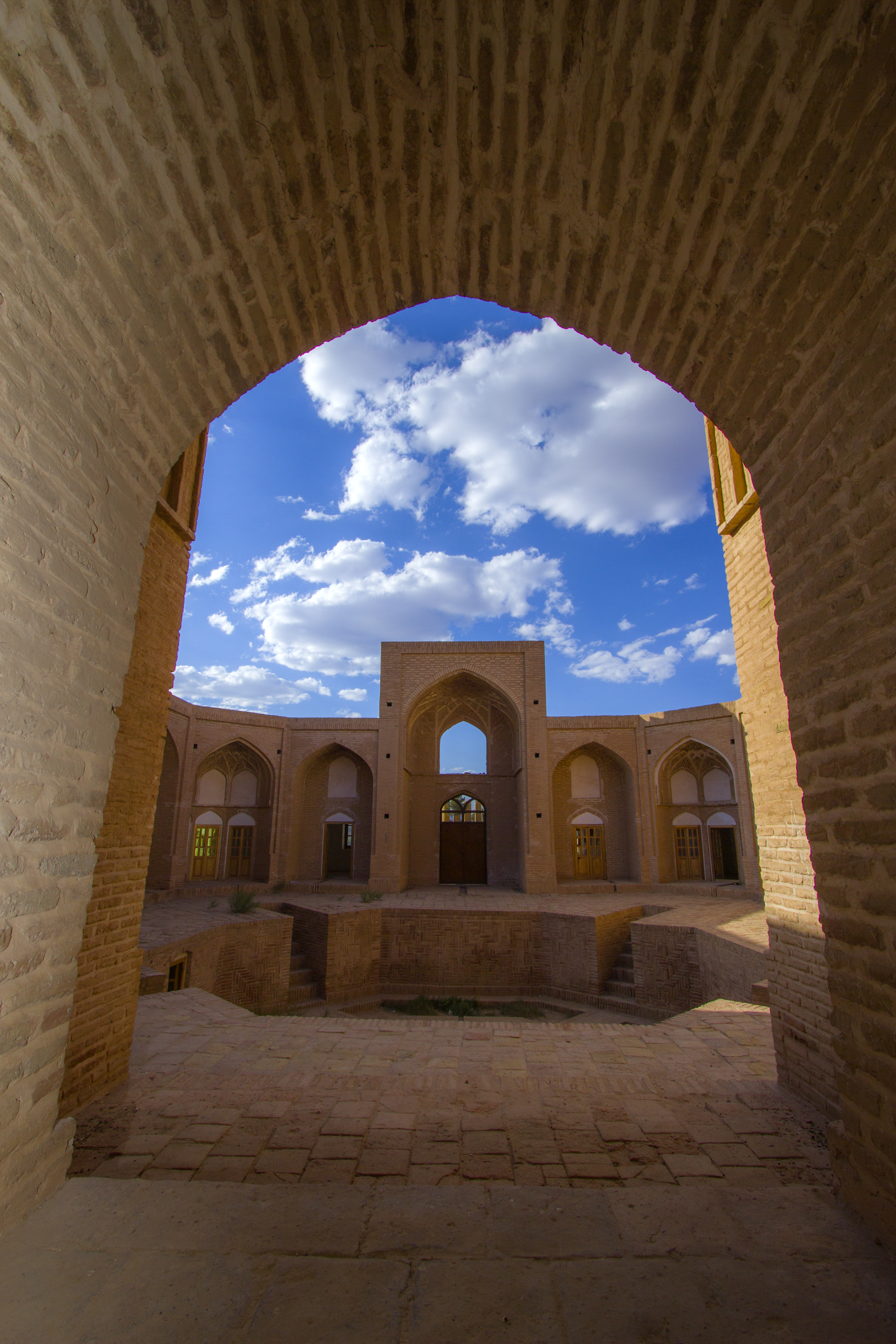
