= Nehbandan Citadel =

Parthian era citadel in Iran

- Near Nehbandan in Iran

Site information
- Type: Citadel

Location
- Coordinates: 31.5332°N 60.0399°E

Site history
- Built: Parthian era
- In use: Safavid era

The Citadel of Nehbandan, or Arg-e Nehbandan, is a citadel from the Parthian era, located in Nehbandan, South Khorasan province, Iran.

Not much remains of the structure due to numerous earthquakes. The citadel is thought to have been possibly built even before the Parthian era according to some indications. To be for sure, its circular plan (300 meters in diameter) at least puts it firmly within the Parthian era.

The structure was occupied primarily for military purposes, and was used until as late as the Safavid era.

== See also ==
- List of Iranian castles
- Iranian architecture
