= South Khorasan province =

Province of Iran

South Khorasan Province استان خراسان جنوبی (Persian)
- Province
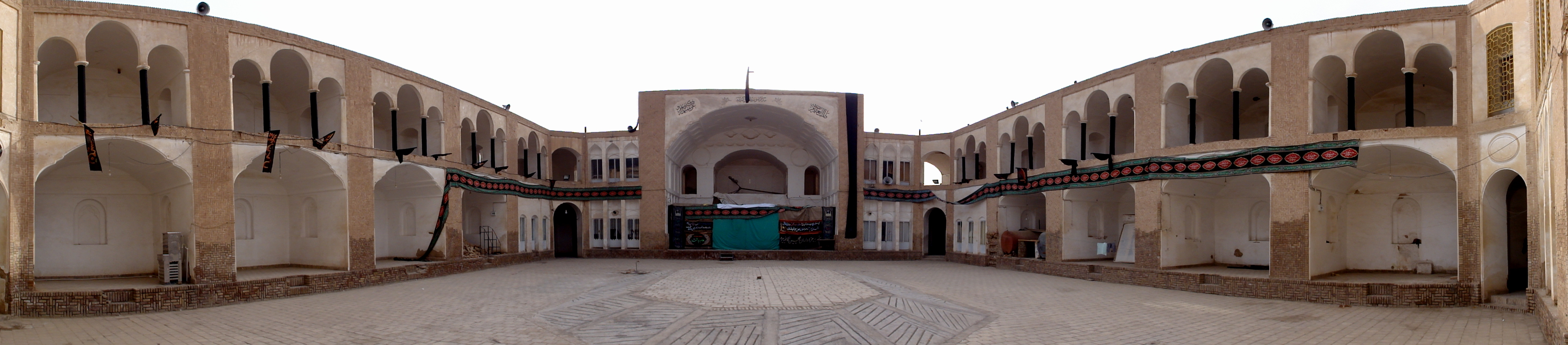
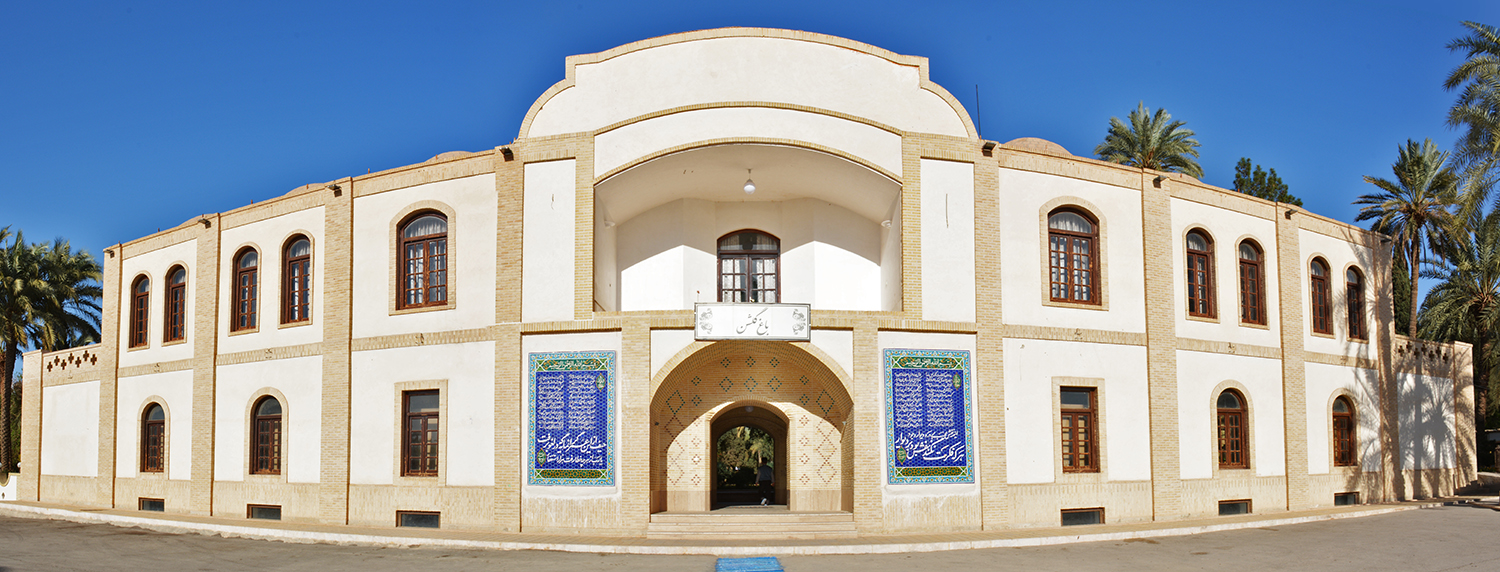
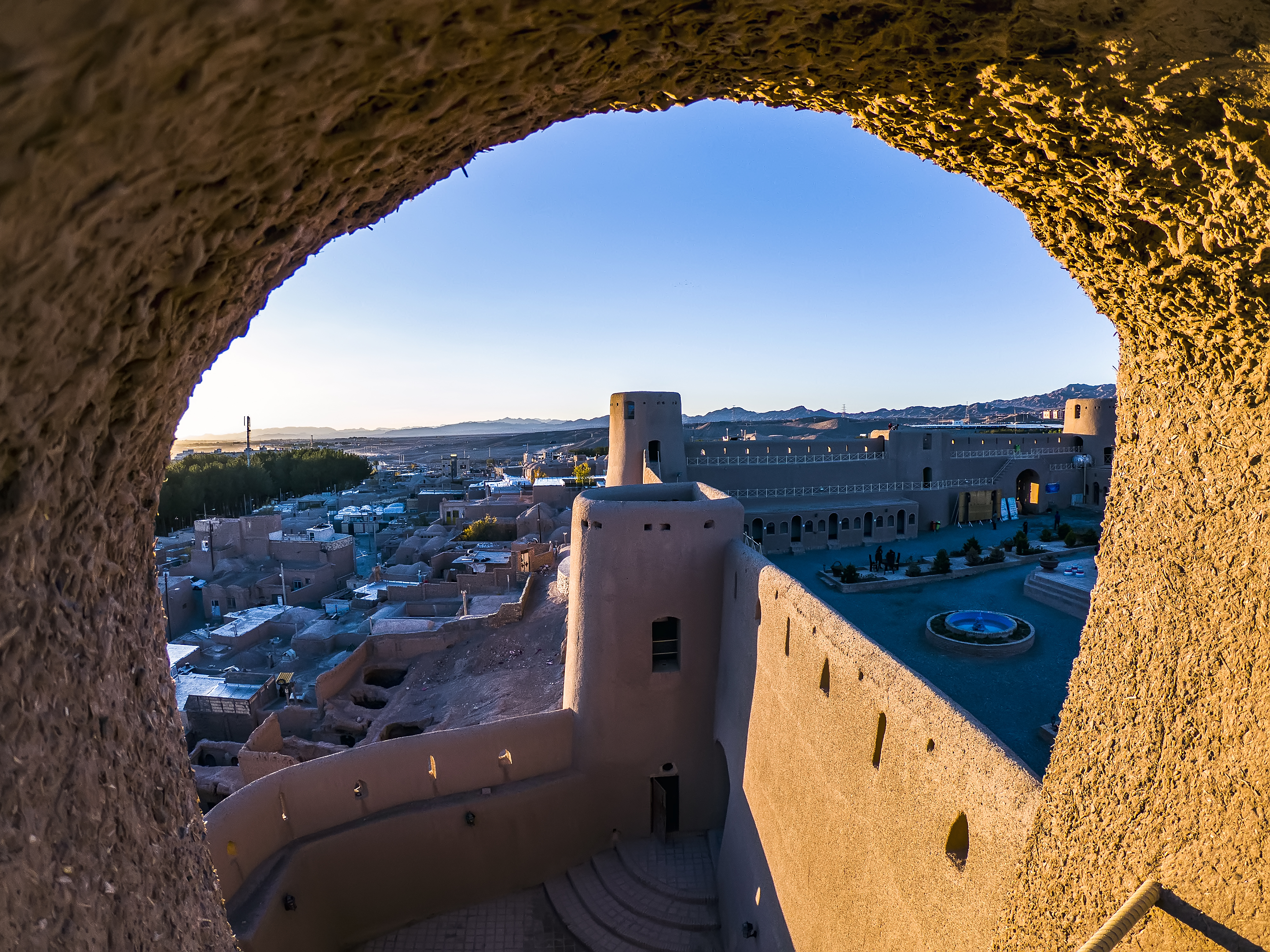
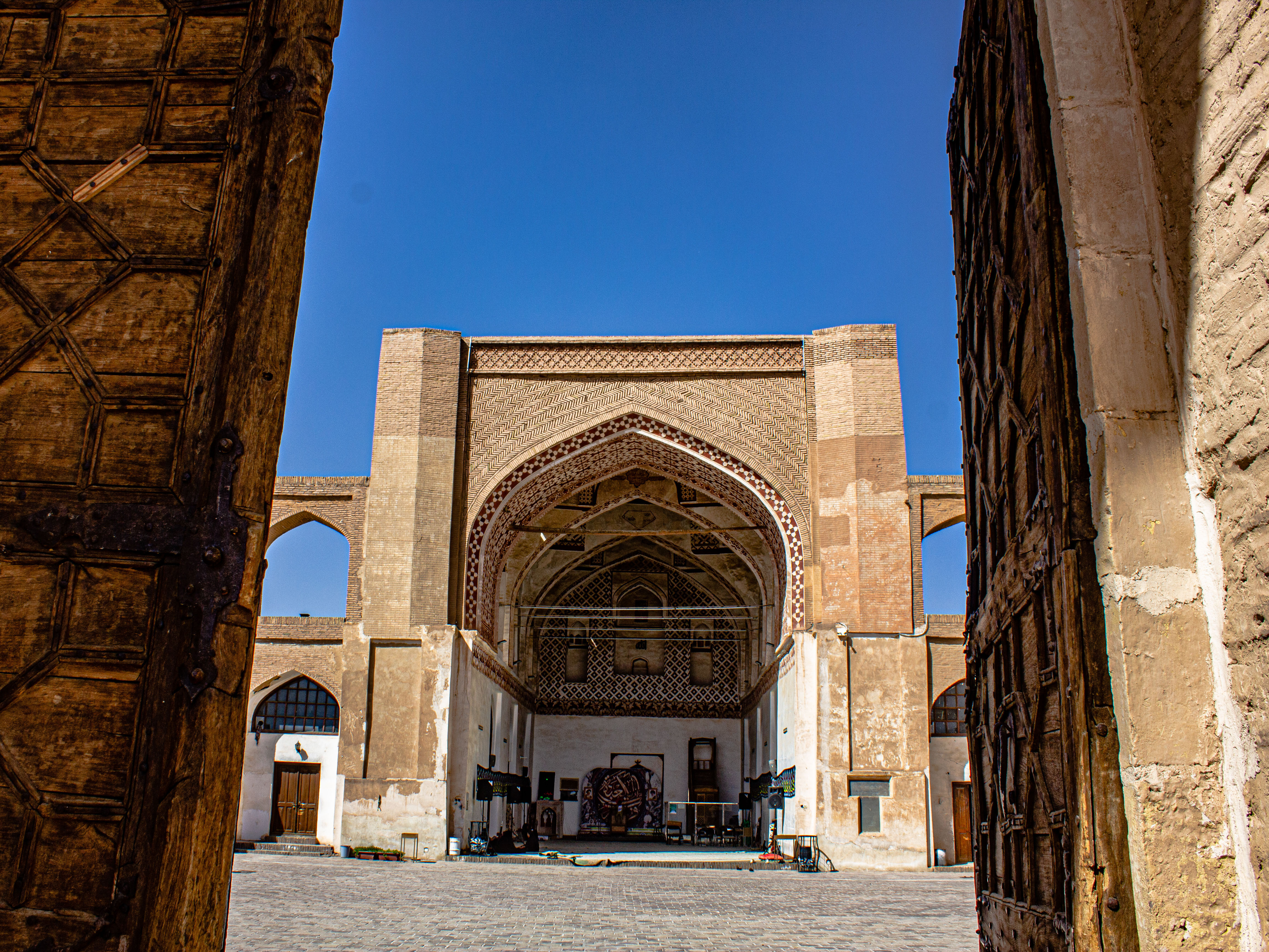
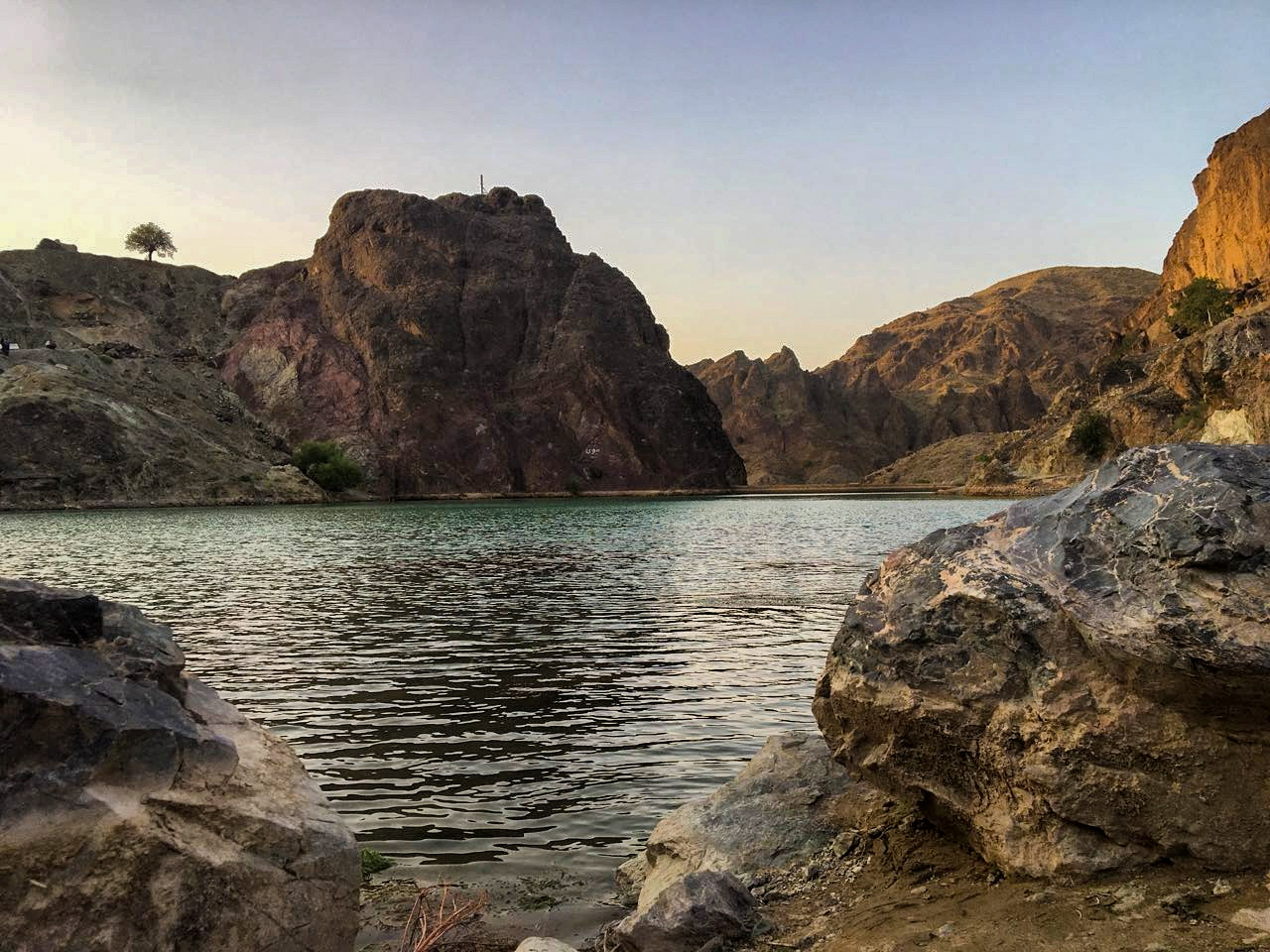
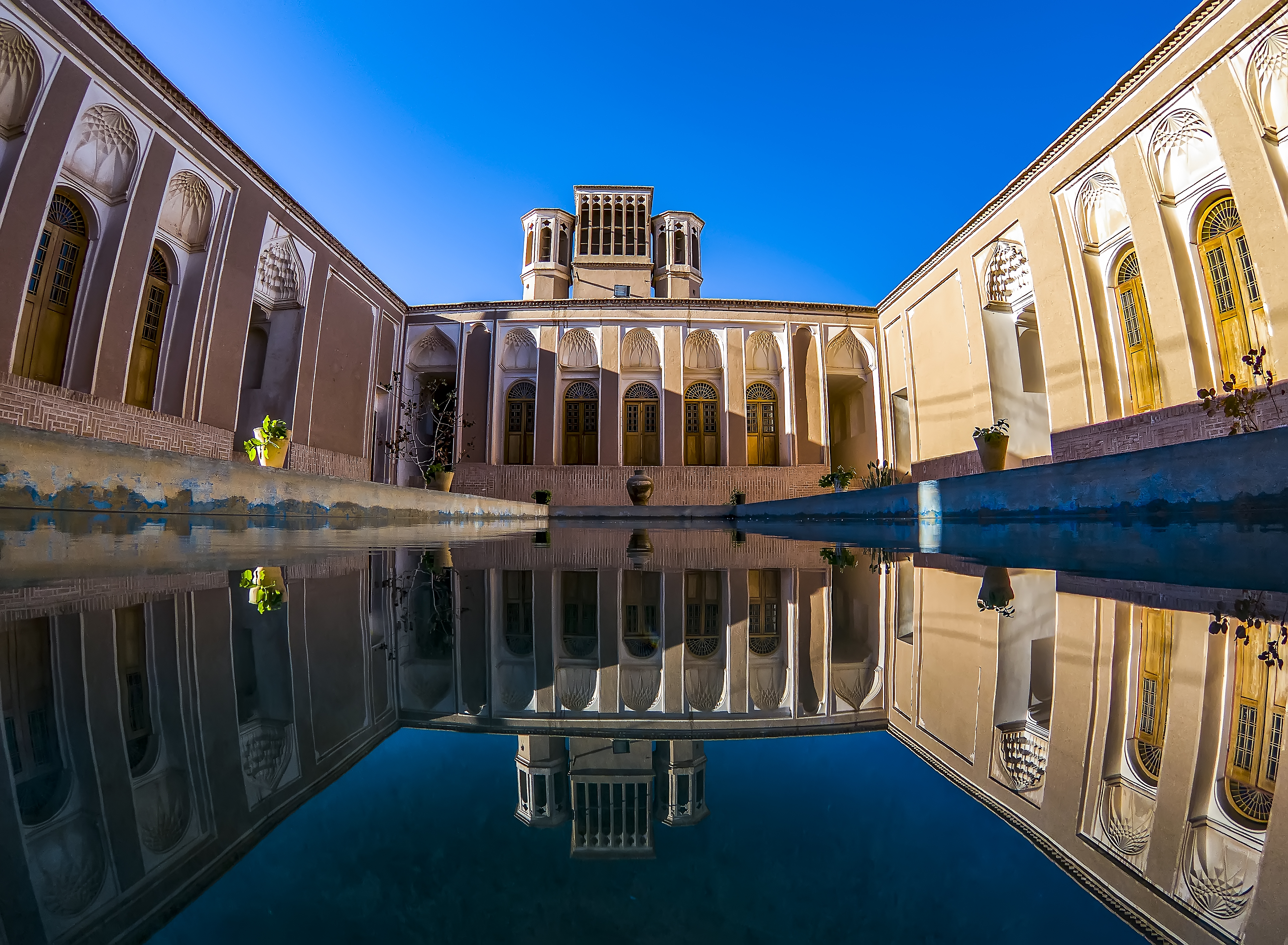

- Location of South Khorasan province within Iran
- Coordinates: 32°48′N 58°11′E
- Country: Iran
- Region: Region 5
- Capital: Birjand
- Counties: 12

Government
  - Governor-general: Mohammad-Reza Hashemi (Principlist)

Area
  - Total: 151,913 km^{2} (58,654 sq mi)

Population (2016)
  - Total: 768,898
  - Density: 5.06144/km^{2} (13.1091/sq mi)
- Time zone: UTC+03:30 (IRST)
- ISO 3166 code: IR-29
- Main language(s): Persian
- HDI (2017): 0.757 high · 27th
- Website: sko.ir

South Khorasan province (Persian: استان خراسان جنوبی) (Note: Also romanised as Ostān-e Xorāsān-e Jonūbī) is one of the 31 provinces of Iran, located in the eastern part of the country. Its capital is the city of Birjand. In 2014, the province was placed in Region 5. This province is bordered to the north by Razavi Khorasan province, to the northwest by Semnan province, to the west by Isfahan and Yazd provinces, to the south by Kerman province, and to the southeast by Sistan and Baluchestan province.

South Khorasan's area is 151,913 square kilometers (58,654 square miles), making it the third-largest province in Iran after Kerman and Sistan and Baluchestan. According to the 2016 census, South Khorasan's population is 768,898, making it the fourth least populous province in the country. With only about 5 inhabitants per square kilometre or 13 inhabitants per square mile, it is the most sparsely populated province in Iran.

South Khorasan province is split into two distinct regions: the "mountainous and elevated" areas in the north and northwest, and the "low and flat" central and southern plains. The tallest mountains in the province include Kamarak and Shah Kuh. It experiences a "dry and desert" climate, which can be further divided into "hot and dry" and "mild and dry" categories. The northern and northwestern parts are more fertile, while the southern and southwestern plains endure a dry and harsh climate. The rivers in this region are seasonal, with no permanent rivers present.

== History ==
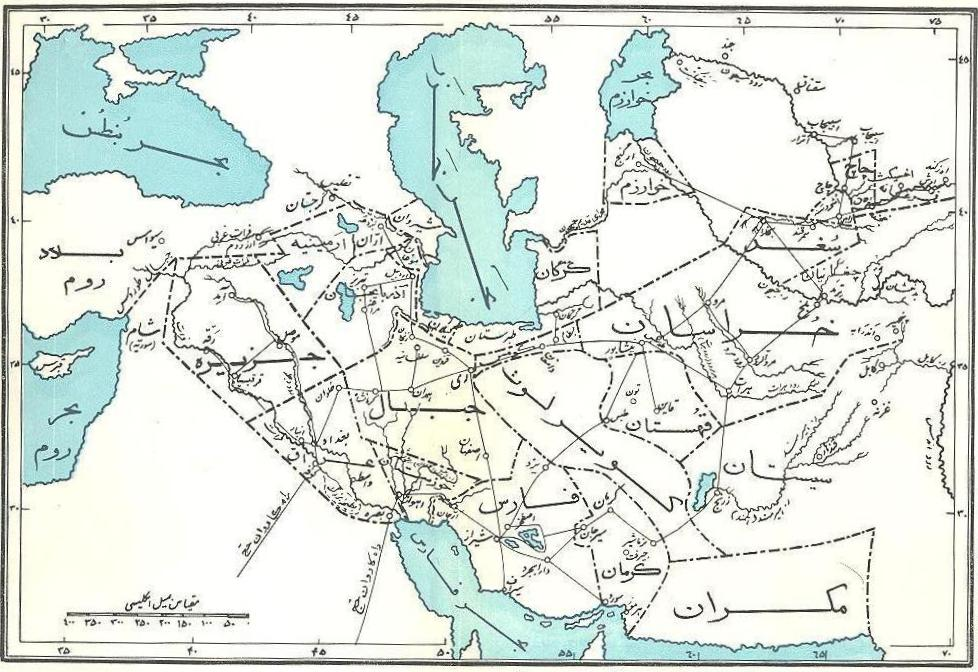
Map of Iran during Abbasid Caliphate. Toon (Ferdows), Qaen and Tabas are the cities indicated in Quhistan (Nowadays South Khorasan Province).

Greater Khorasan has witnessed the rise and fall of many dynasties and governments in its territory throughout history. Various tribes of the Arabs, Turks, Kurds and Turkmens brought changes to the region time and time again. Ancient geographers of Iran divided Iran ("Iran-Shahr") into eight segments, of which the most flourishing and largest was the territory of Greater Khorasan. Esfarayen, among other cities of the province, was one of the focal points for the residence of the Aryan tribes after entering Iran.

The Parthian empire was based near Merv in Khorasan for many years. At Parthians times, Esfarayen was one of the important villages of Nishapur.

During the Sassanid dynasty, the province was governed by a Spahbod (Lieutenant General) called "Padgoosban" and four margraves, each commander of one of the four parts of the province.

Khorasan was divided into four parts during the Muslim conquest of Persia, each section being named after the four largest cities, Nishapur, Merv, Herat, and Balkh.

In the year 651, the army of Islamic Arabs invaded Khorasan. The territory remained in the hands of the Abbasid clan until 820, followed by the rule of the Iranian Taherid clan in the year 896 and the Samanid dynasty in 900.

Mahmud of Ghazni conquered Khorasan in 994 and in the year 1037 Toghrül, the first of the Seljuq empire rulers conquered Nishapur.

Mahmud of Ghazni retaliated against the invaders several times, and finally the Ghaznavids defeated Sultan Sanjar. But there was more to come, as in 1157 Khorasan was conquered by the Khwarazmids and because of simultaneous attacks by the Mongols, Khorasan was annexed to the territories of the Mongol Ilkhanate.

In the 14th century, a flag of independence was hoisted by the Sarbedaran movement in Sabzevar, and in 1468, Khorasan came into the hands of Tamerlane and the city of Herat was declared as the capital.

In 1507, Khorasan was occupied by Uzbek tribes. After the death of Nader Shah in 1747, parts of it were occupied by the Afghans for a short period.

In these periods, Birjand was a small part of Quhistan which almost encompasses the borders of present-day South Khorasan. The main cities of Quhistan were Toon (now Ferdows) and Qaen. Birjand grew in recent centuries, especially during the Qajar dynasty and found its important role in this region.

This region was a place of refuge for some movements like the Ismaili, and was the target of Arab refugees who escaped from the tyranny of the Abbasid caliphate. Zoroastrian vestiges also exist in the area.

In 1824, Herat became independent for several years when the Afghan Empire was split between the Durranis and Barakzais. The Persians sieged the city in 1837, but the British assisted the Afghans in repelling them. In 1856, the Persians launched another invasion, and briefly managed to recapture the city; it led directly to the Anglo-Persian War. In 1857 hostilities between the Persians and the British ended after the Treaty of Paris was signed, and the Persian troops withdrew from Herat. Afghanistan reconquered Herat in 1863 under Dost Muhammad Khan, two weeks before his death.

This new province is but the old Quhistan which was included into greater Khorasan in the Iranian administrative planning. However, historically Qohistan forms a separate entity, with a distinct culture, history, environment and ecology.

South Khorasan is one of the three provinces that were created after the division of Khorasan in 2004. While at the beginning, the newly created "South Khorasan" included only Birjand County and some new counties detached from that county (i.e. Nehbandan, Darmian and Sarbisheh), in subsequent years, all northern and western cities and territories of the old Quhistan (such as Qaen, Ferdows and Tabas) have been annexed into South Khorasan, which as of 2016 consists of 11 counties.

Khorasan was the largest province of Iran until it was divided into three provinces on 29 September 2004. The provinces approved by the parliament of Iran (on 18 May 2004) and the Council of Guardians (on 29 May 2004) were Razavi Khorasan, North Khorasan, and South Khorasan.

== Demographics ==
=== Population ===
At the time of the 2006 National Census, the province's population was 600,568 in 159,255 households. The following census in 2011 counted 662,534 people in 183,114 households. The 2016 census measured the population of the province as 768,898 in 223,984 households. It is the least densely populated province.

=== Administrative divisions ===

The population history and structural changes of South Khorasan province's administrative divisions over three consecutive censuses are shown in the following table.

South Khorasan Province
Counties	2006	2011	2016
Birjand	221,756	259,506	261,324
Boshruyeh (Note: Separated from Ferdows County after the 2006 census)	—	24,683	26,064
Darmian	51,793	55,080	53,714
Eshqabad (Note: Separated from Tabas County after the 2016 census)	—	—	—
Ferdows	61,346	41,626	45,523
Khusf (Note: Separated from Birjand County after the 2011 census)	—	—	27,600
Nehbandan	56,089	57,258	51,449
Qaen	137,357	152,401	116,181
Sarayan	34,636	32,493	33,312
Sarbisheh	37,591	39,487	40,959
Tabas (Note: Separated from Yazd province after the 2011 census)	—	—	72,617
Zirkuh (Note: Separated from Qaen County after the 2011 census)	—	—	40,155
Total	600,568	662,534	768,898

=== Cities ===
According to the 2016 census, 448,147 people (over 58% of the population of South Khorasan province) live in the following cities:

City	Population
Arianshahr	3,729
Asadiyeh	5,460
Ayask	5,143,
Birjand	203,636
Boshruyeh	16,426
Deyhuk	2,959
Eresk	2,955
Esfeden	3,598
Eshqabad	3,965
Eslamiyeh	7,108
Ferdows	28,695
Gazik	2,294
Hajjiabad	6,168
Khusf	5,716
Mohammadshahr	3,590
Mud	3,477
Nehbandan	18,304
Nimbeluk	4,762
Qaen	42,323
Qohestan	2,322
Sarayan	13,795
Sarbisheh	8,715
Seh Qaleh	4,436
Shusef	3,181
Tabas	39,676
Tabas-e Masina	4,596
Zohan	1,118

=== Most populous cities ===
The following sorted table lists the most populous cities in South Khorasan province.

Rank	City	County	Population
1	Birjand	Birjand	203,636
2	Qaen	Qaen	42,323
3	Tabas	Tabas	39,676
4	Ferdows	Ferdows	28,695
5	Nehbandan	Nehbandan	18,304
6	Boshruyeh	Boshruyeh	16,426
7	Sarayan	Sarayan	13,795
8	Sarbisheh	Sarbisheh	8,715
9	Eslamiyeh	Ferdows	7,108
10	Hajjiabad	Zirkuh	6,168

== South Khorasan today ==
The major ethnic group in this region are the Persians. South Khorasan is known for its famous rugs as well as its saffron, barberry which is produced in almost all parts of the province.

== Historic and natural attractions ==
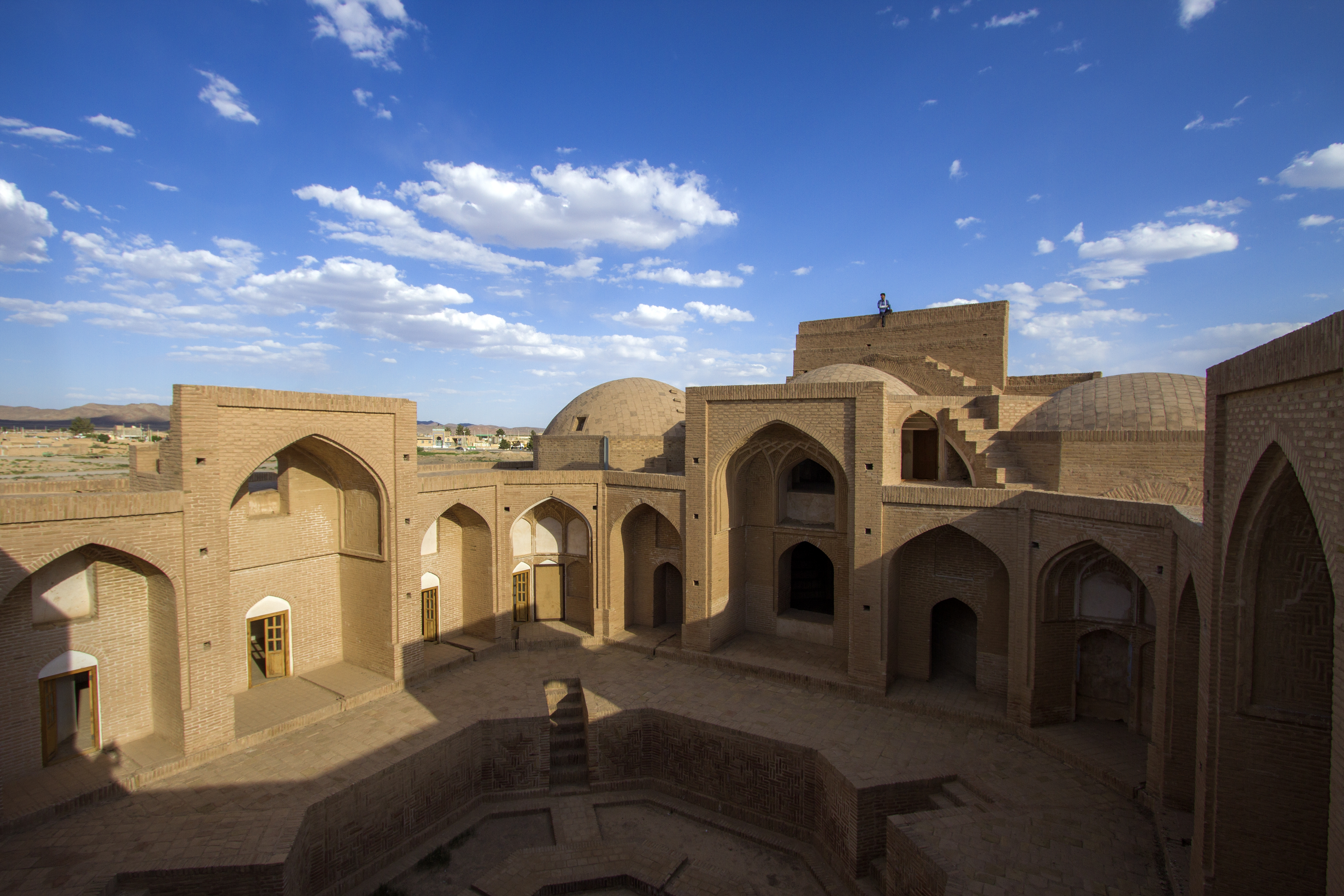
Ferdows Religious School in Ferdows

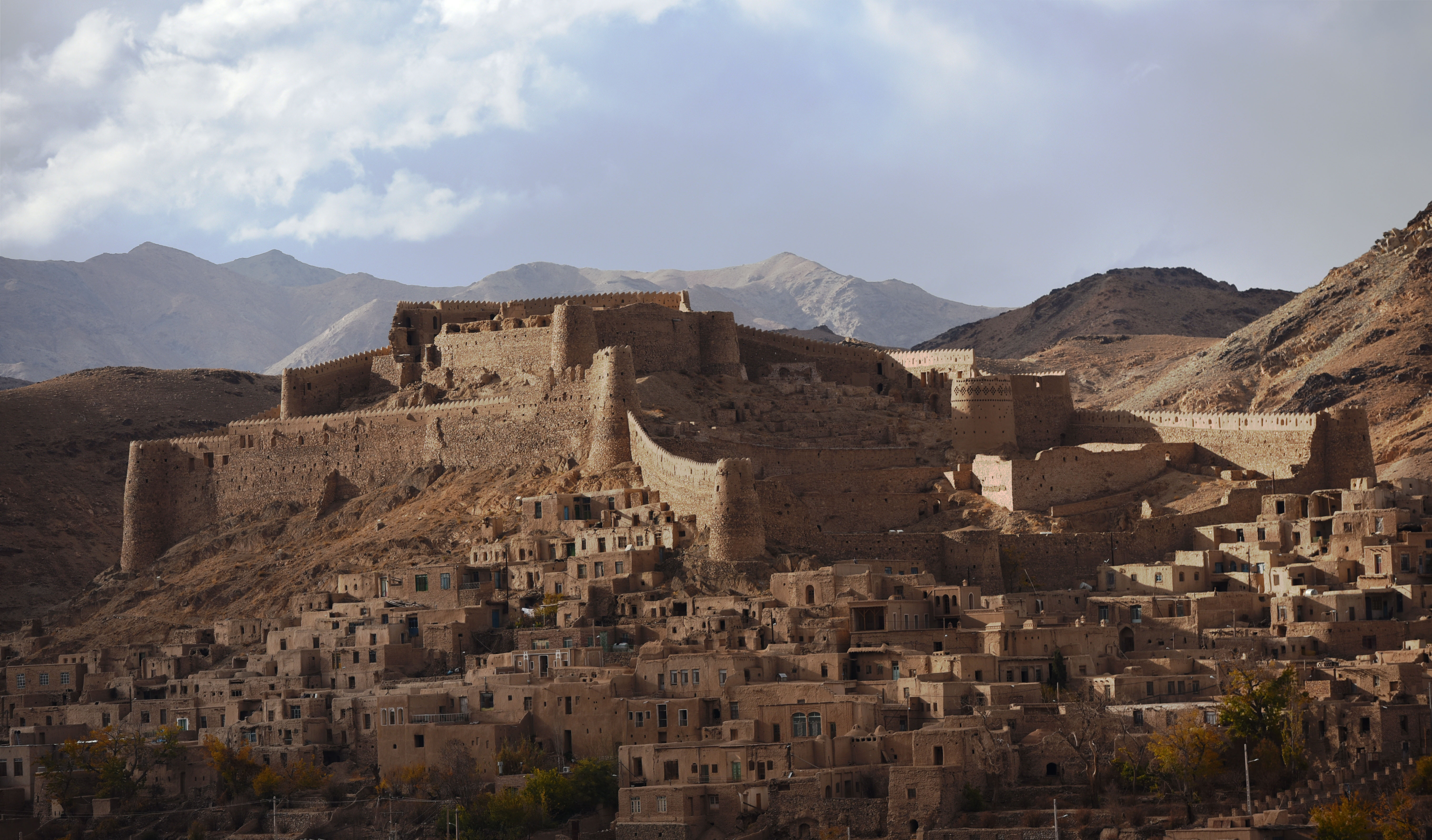
Furg Citadel in Furg, Darmian

South Khorasan has many historic and natural attractions, but besides these, South Khorasan encompasses various religious buildings and places of pilgrimage as well.

The Cultural Heritage of Iran lists 1179 sites of historical and cultural significance in all three provinces of Khorasan.

Some of the popular attractions of South Khorasan are:

- Birjand castle
- Deragon cave
- Furg Citadel
- Ferdows Religious School
- Ferdows Hole-in-the-Rock
- Ferdows Hot Spring
- Ghal'eh Paeen-Shahr
- Jameh Mosque of Ferdows
- Kurit Dam
- Kushk Complex
- Nehbandan Citadel
- Polond Desert
- Qanats of Baladeh Ferdows

== Higher education ==
- Academy of Amuzesh-e Aly
- Academy of Amuzesh-e Modiriat Dolaty
- Academy of Tarbiat-e Moalem
- Birjand University of Medical Sciences
- Birjand University of Technology
- Islamic Azad University of Birjand
- Islamic Azad University of Ferdows
- Payame Noor University
- University of Applied Science and Technology (south khorasan branch)
- University of Birjand

== Gallery ==
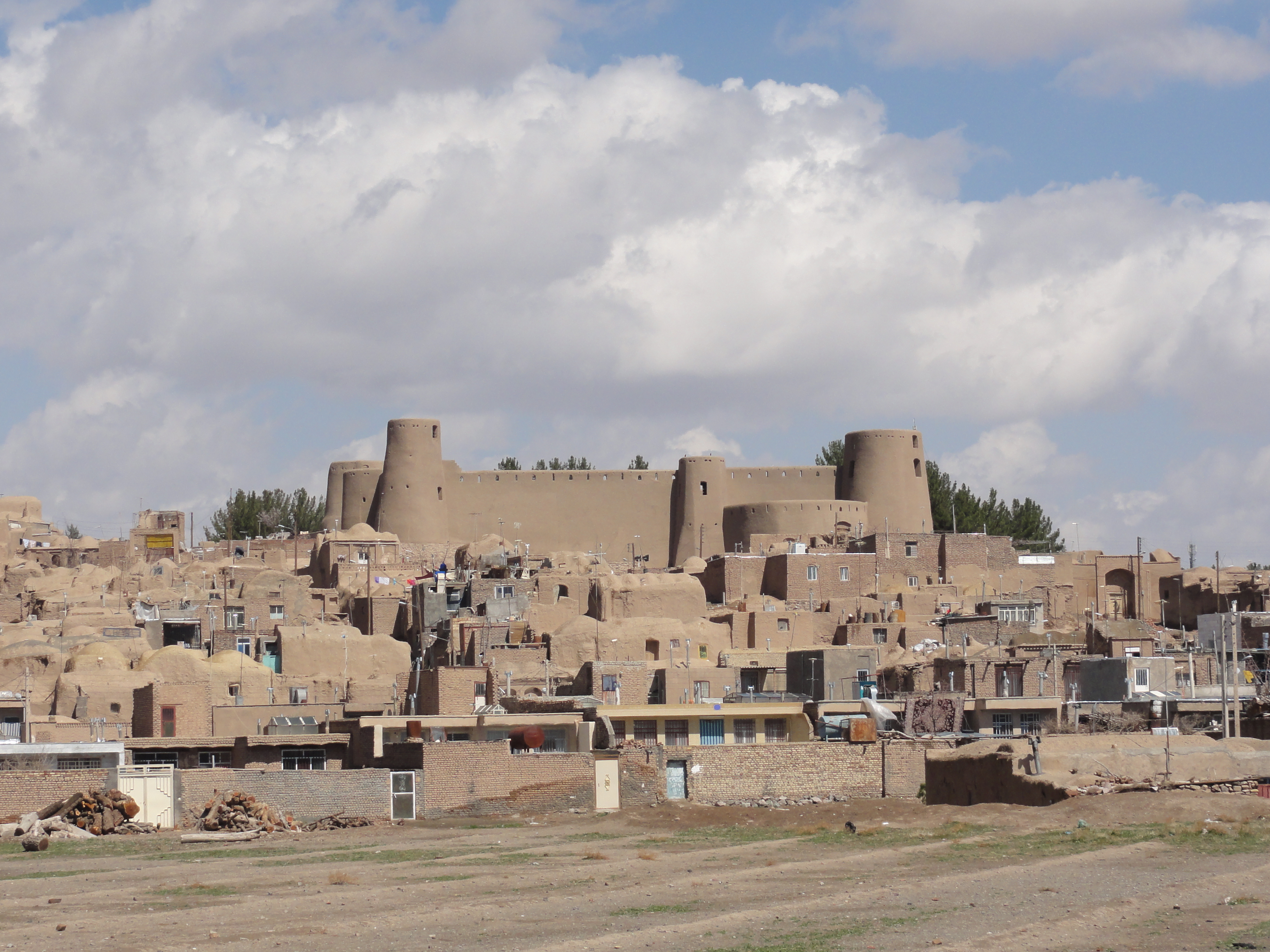
Birjand

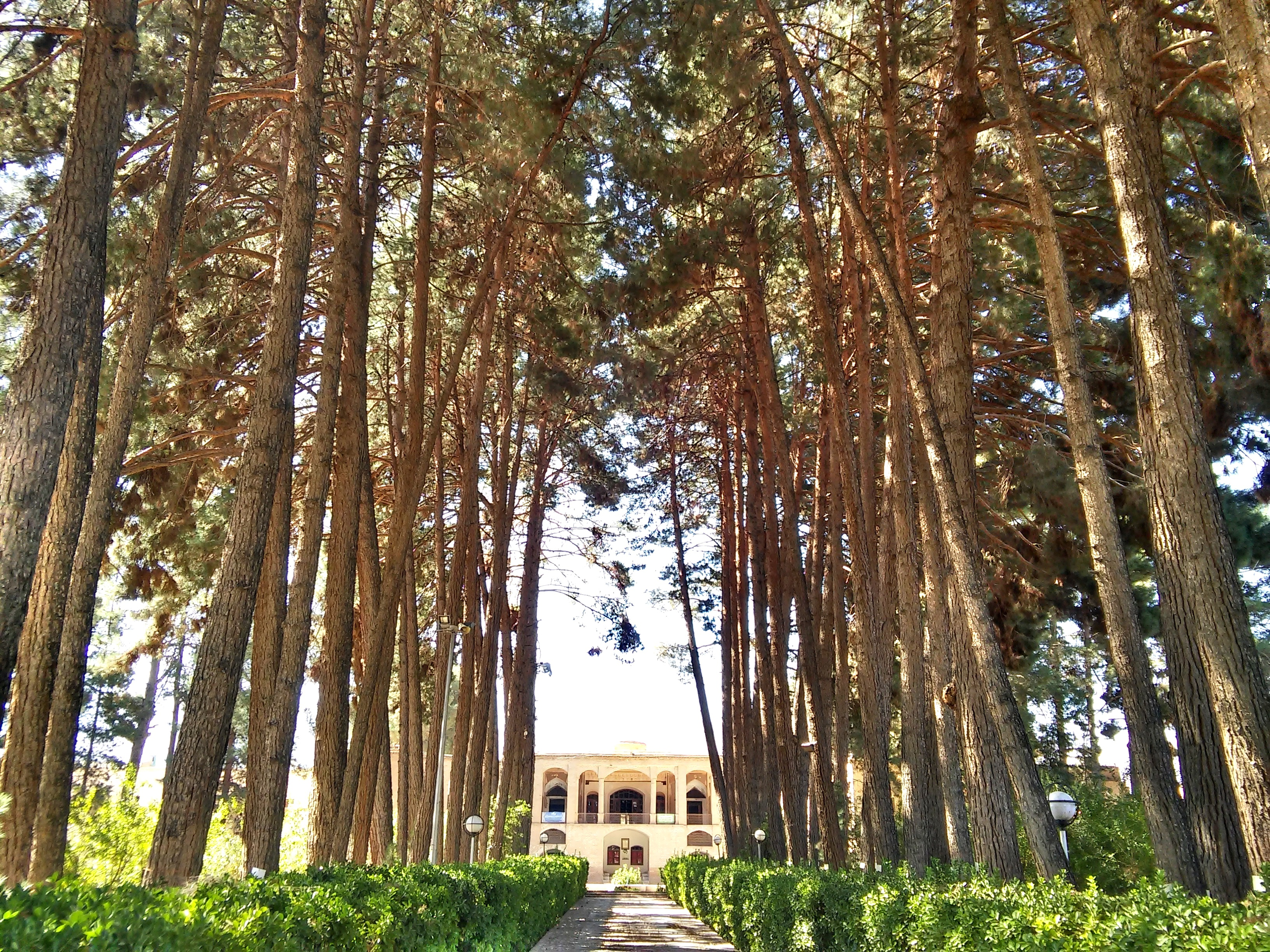
Birjand

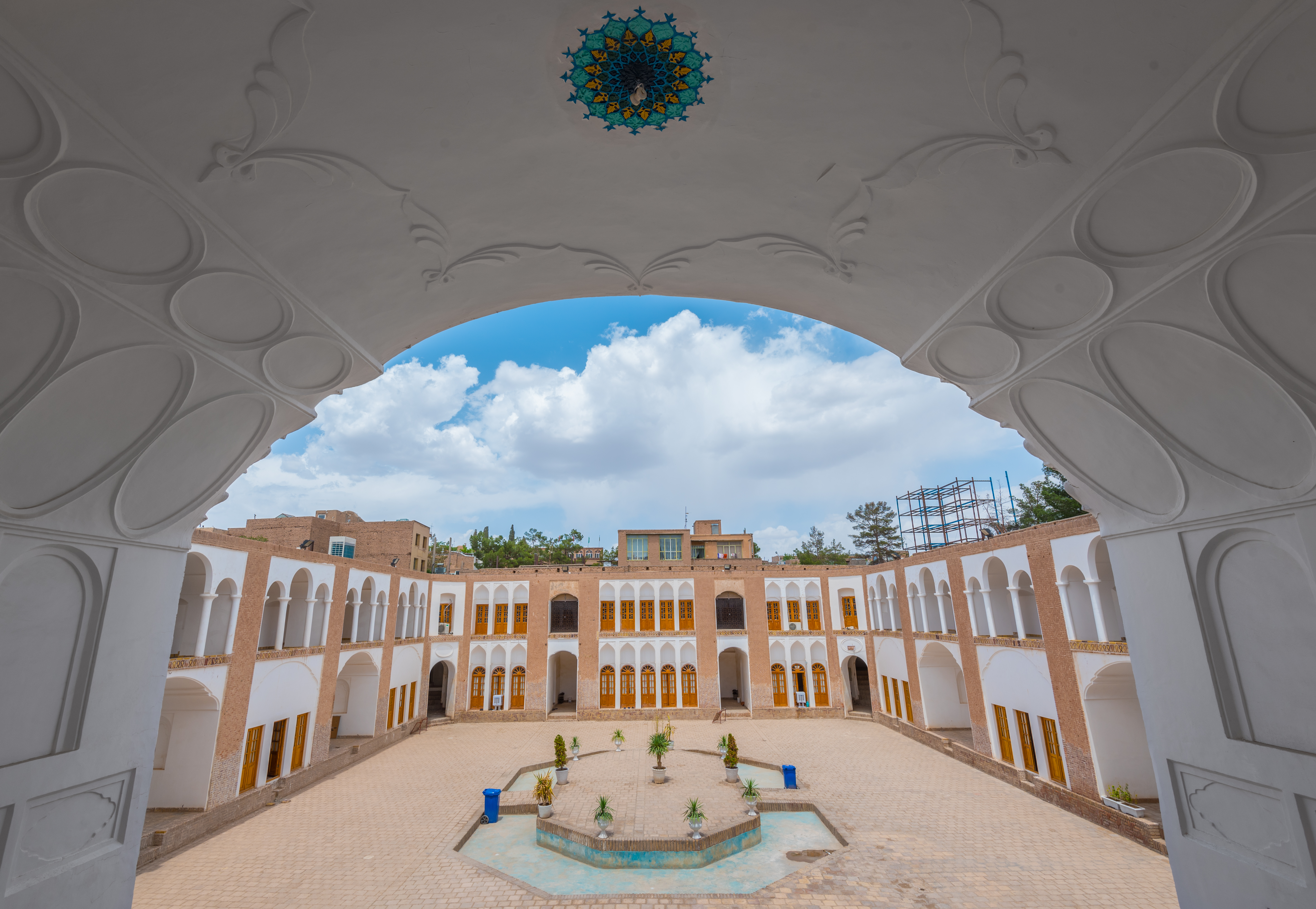
Birjand

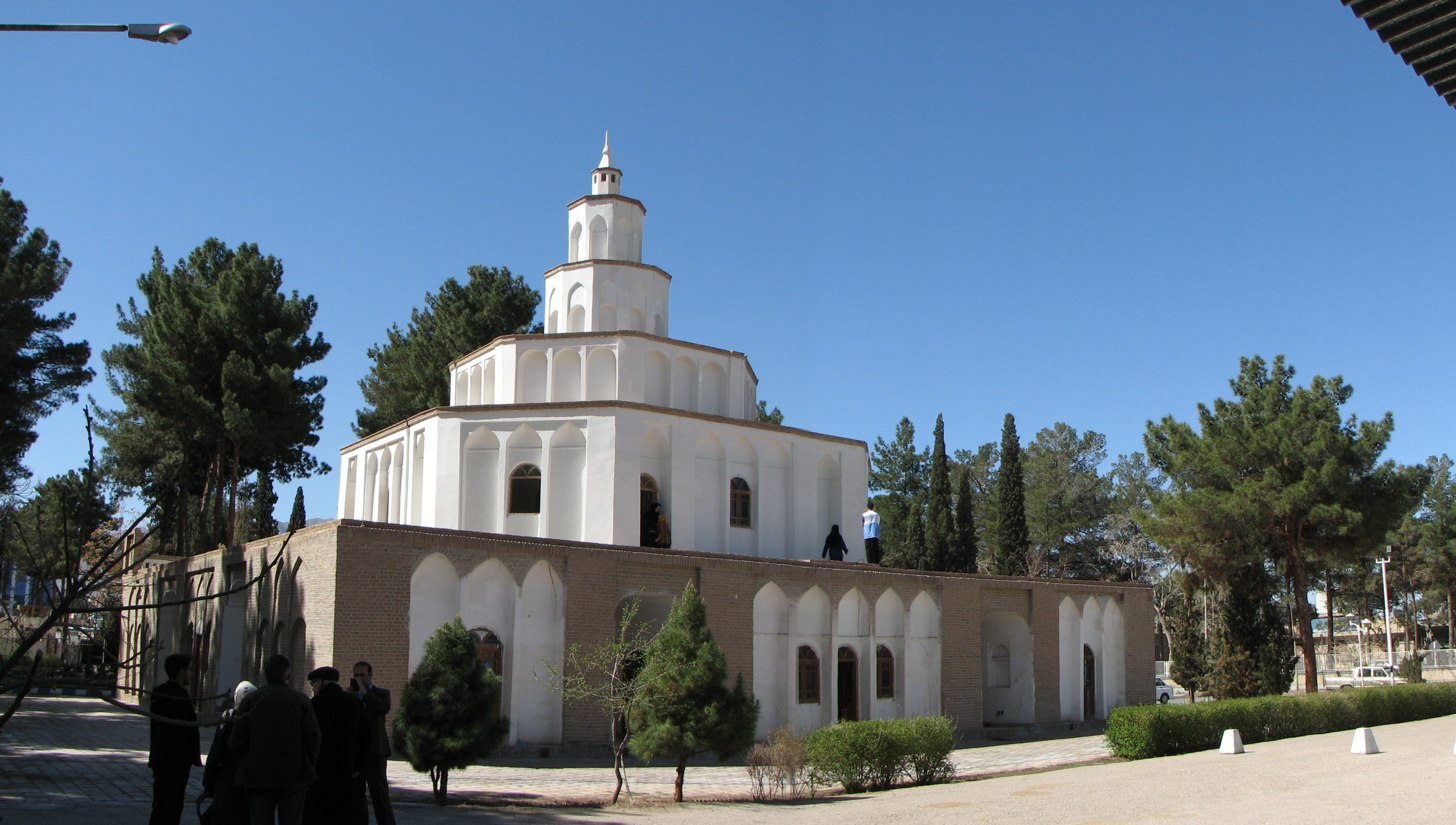
Birjand

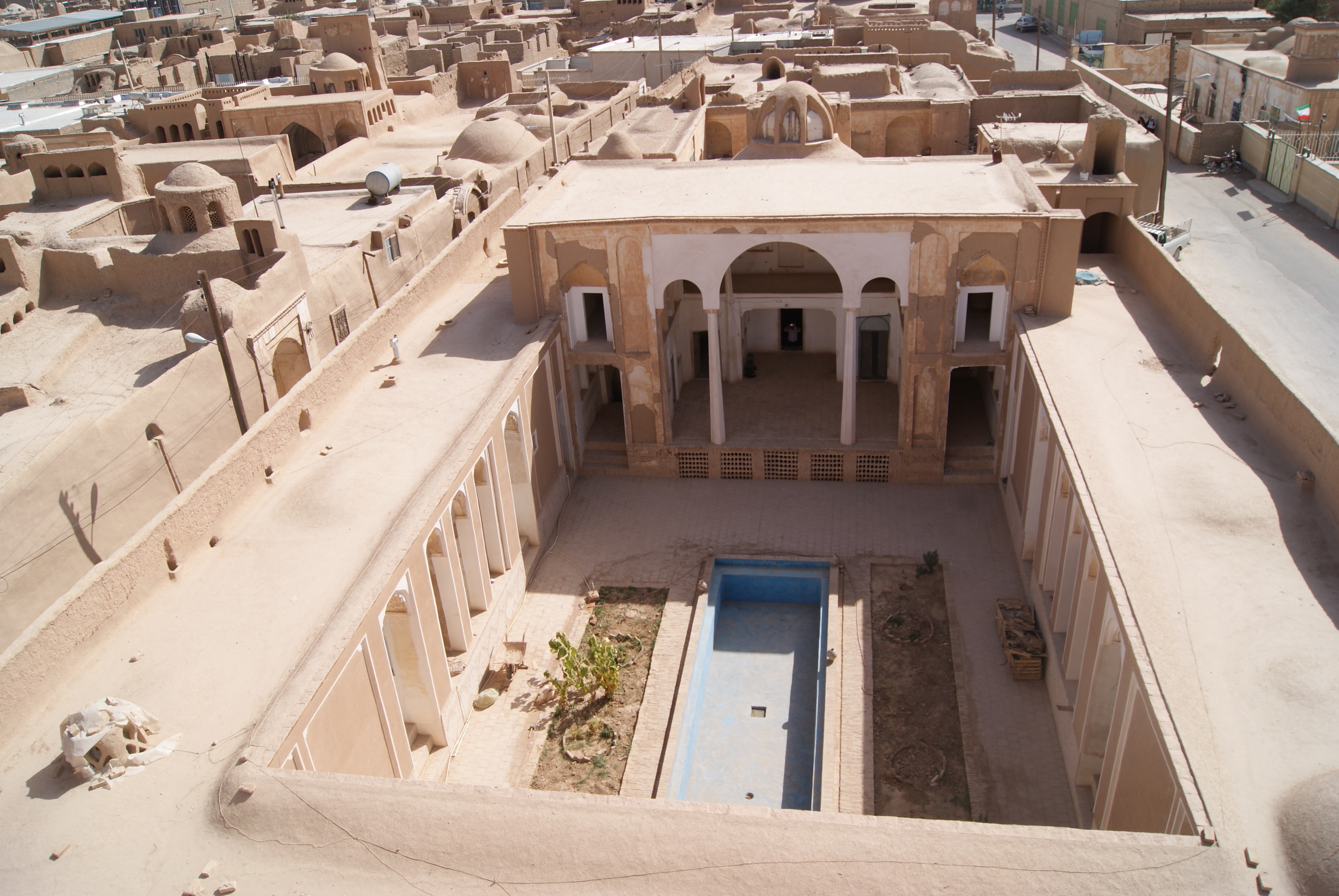
Boshruyeh

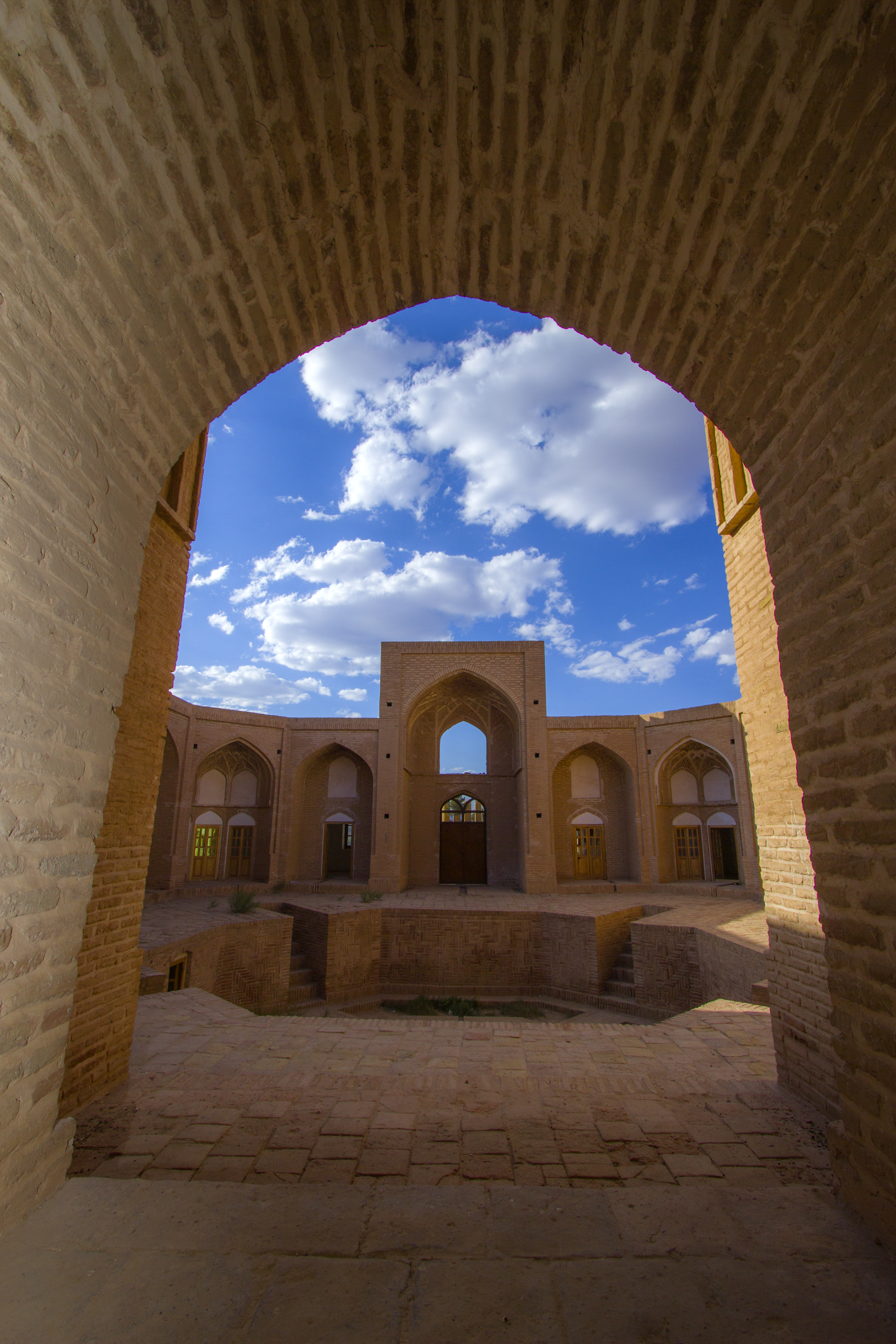
Ferdows

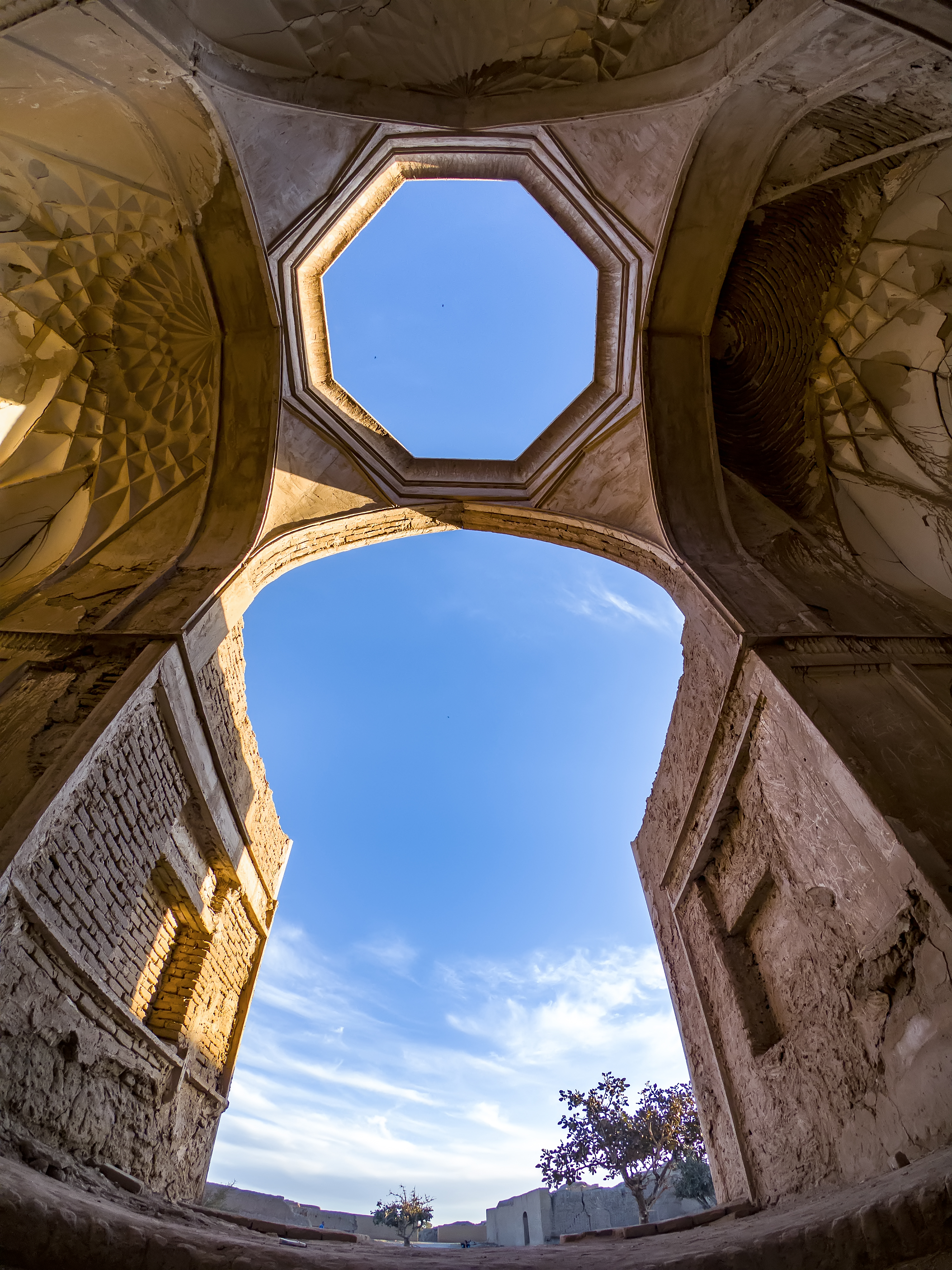
Ferdows

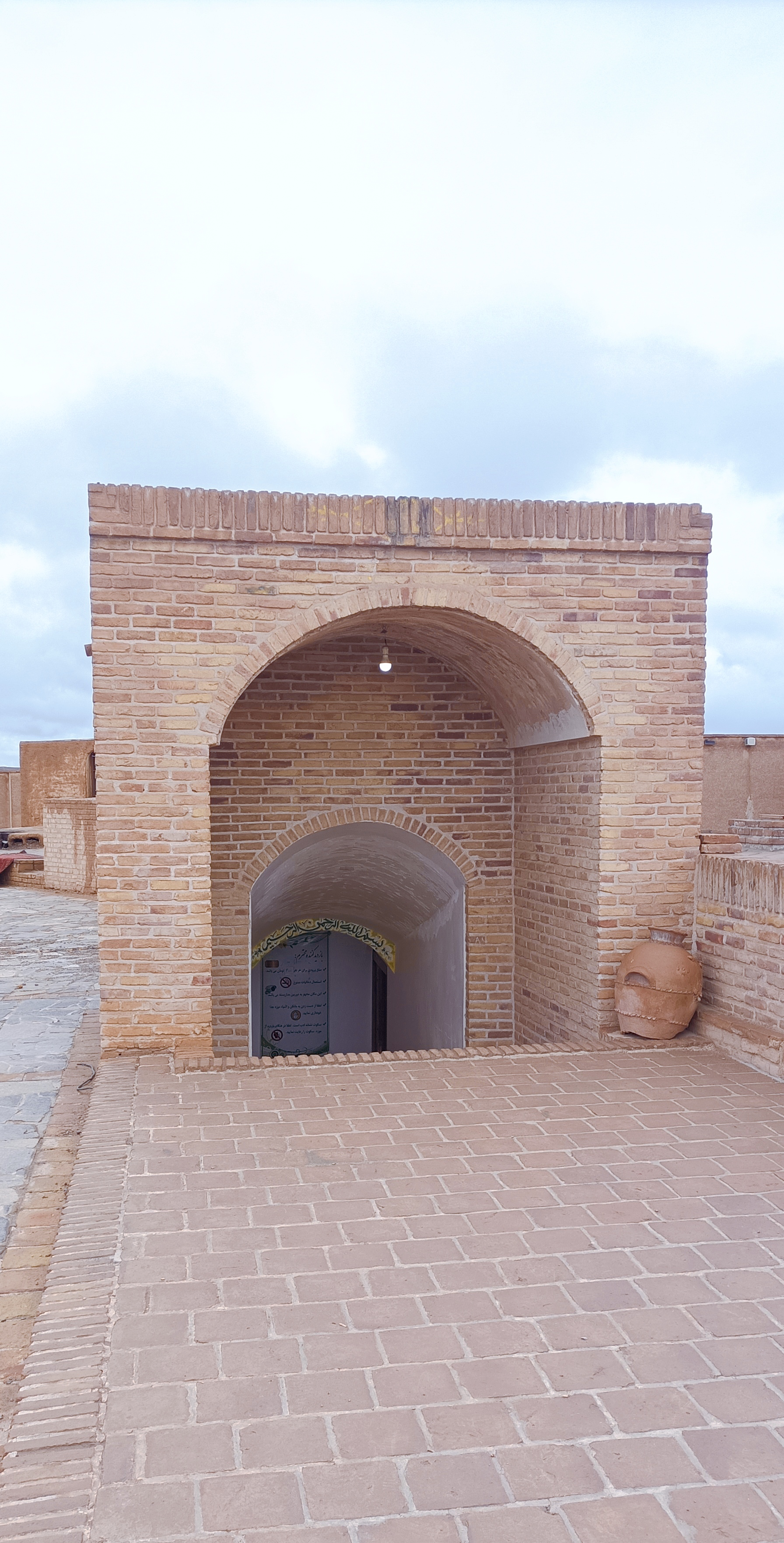
Ferdows

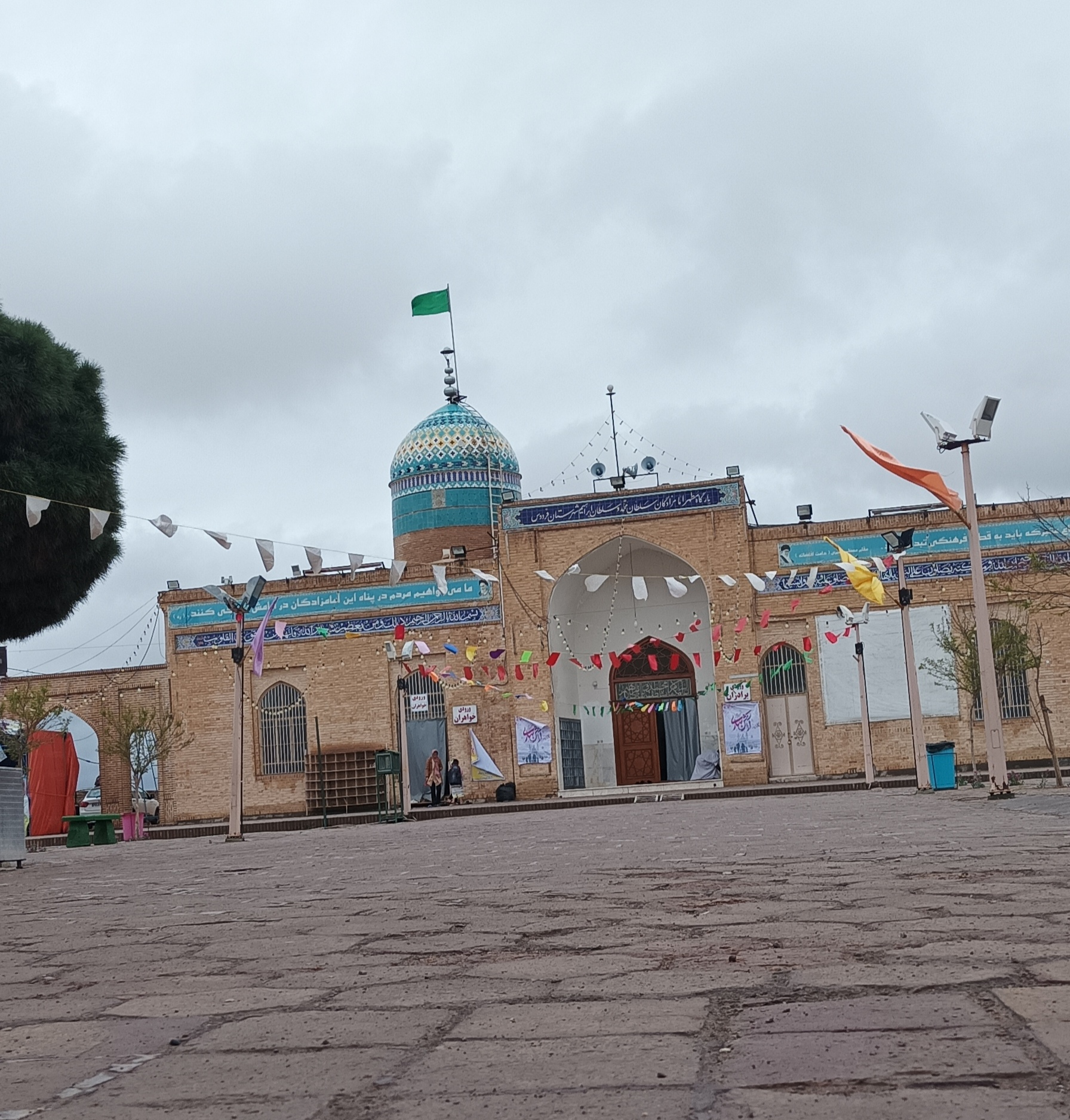
Ferdows

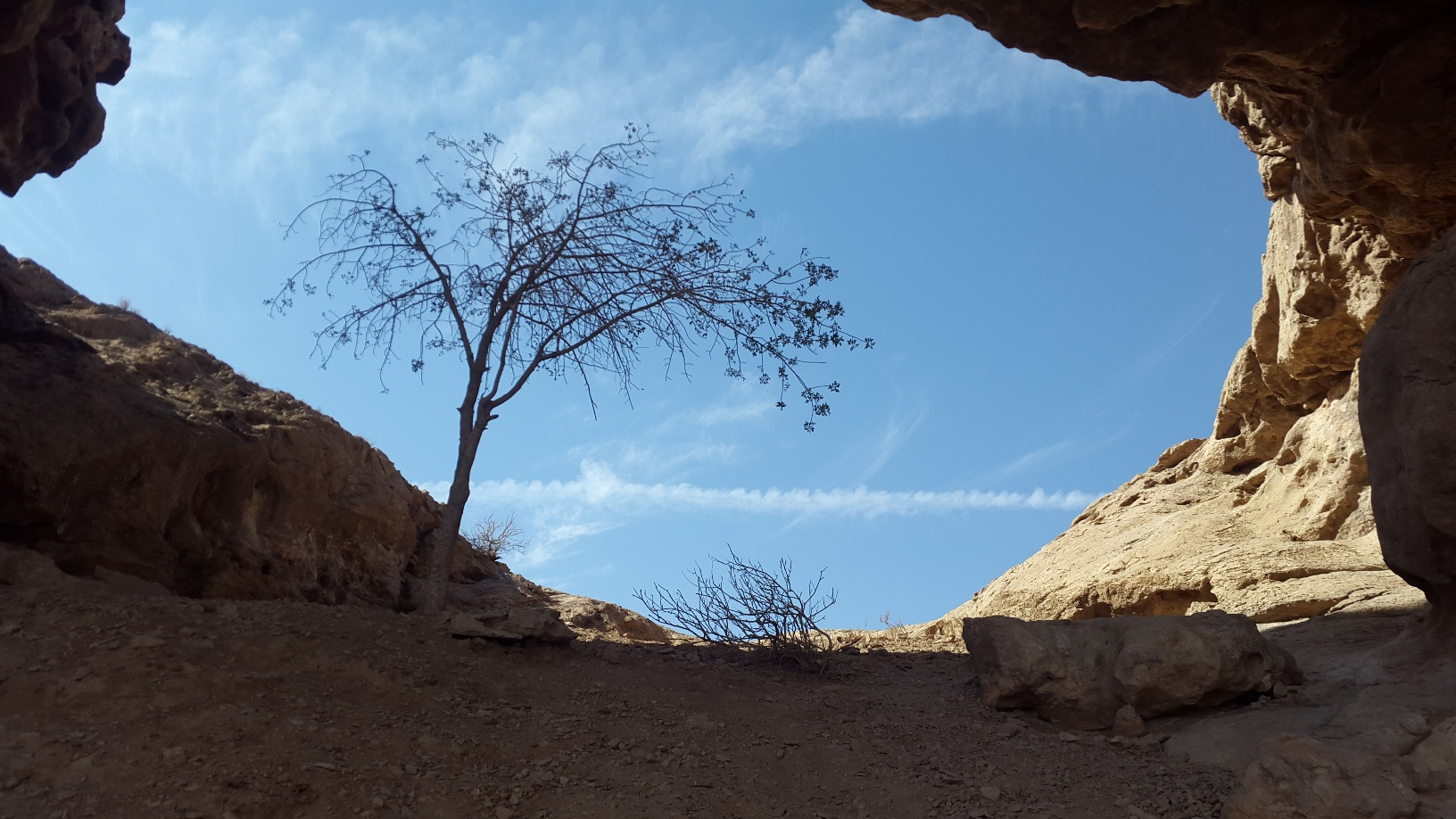
Ferdows

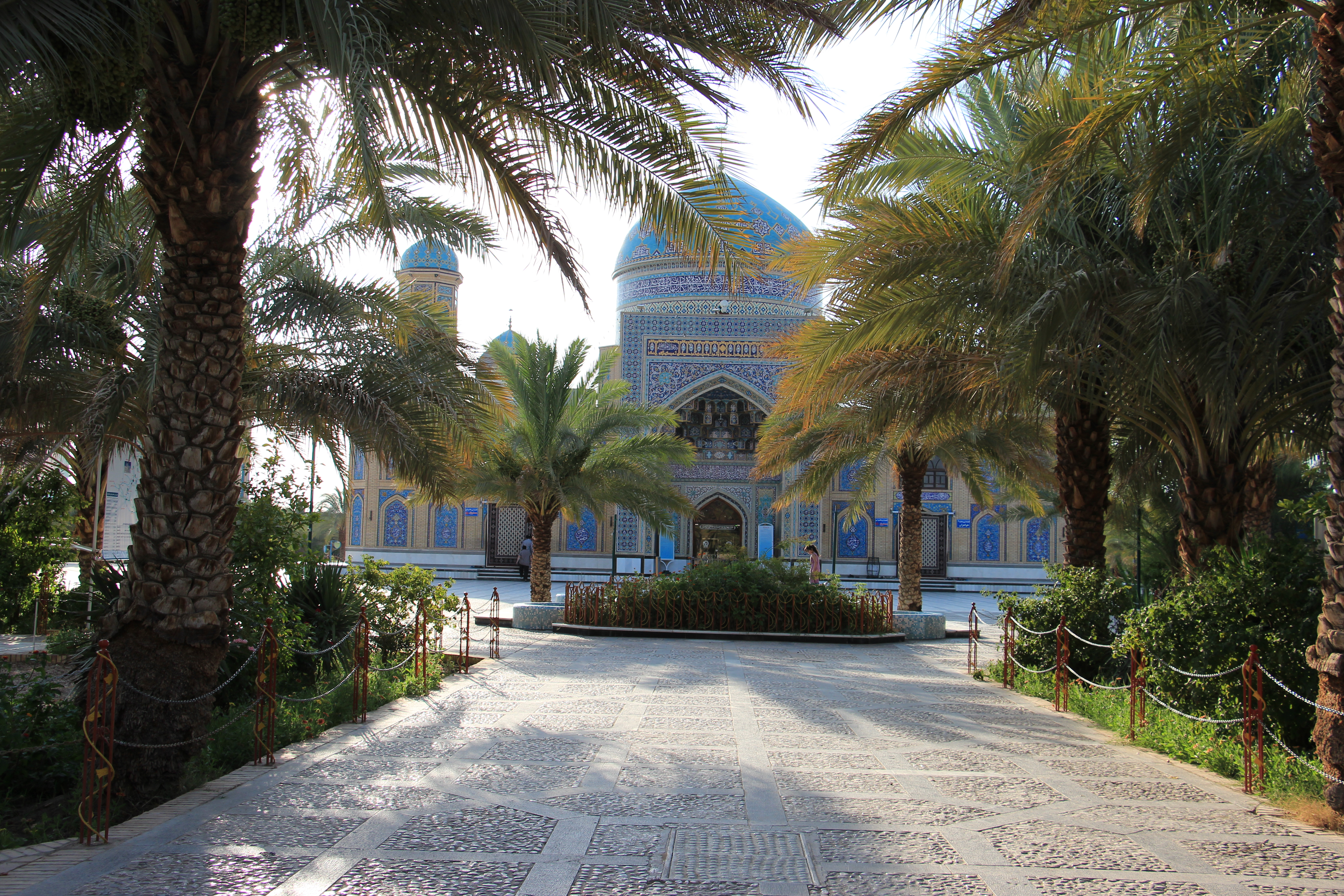
Tabas

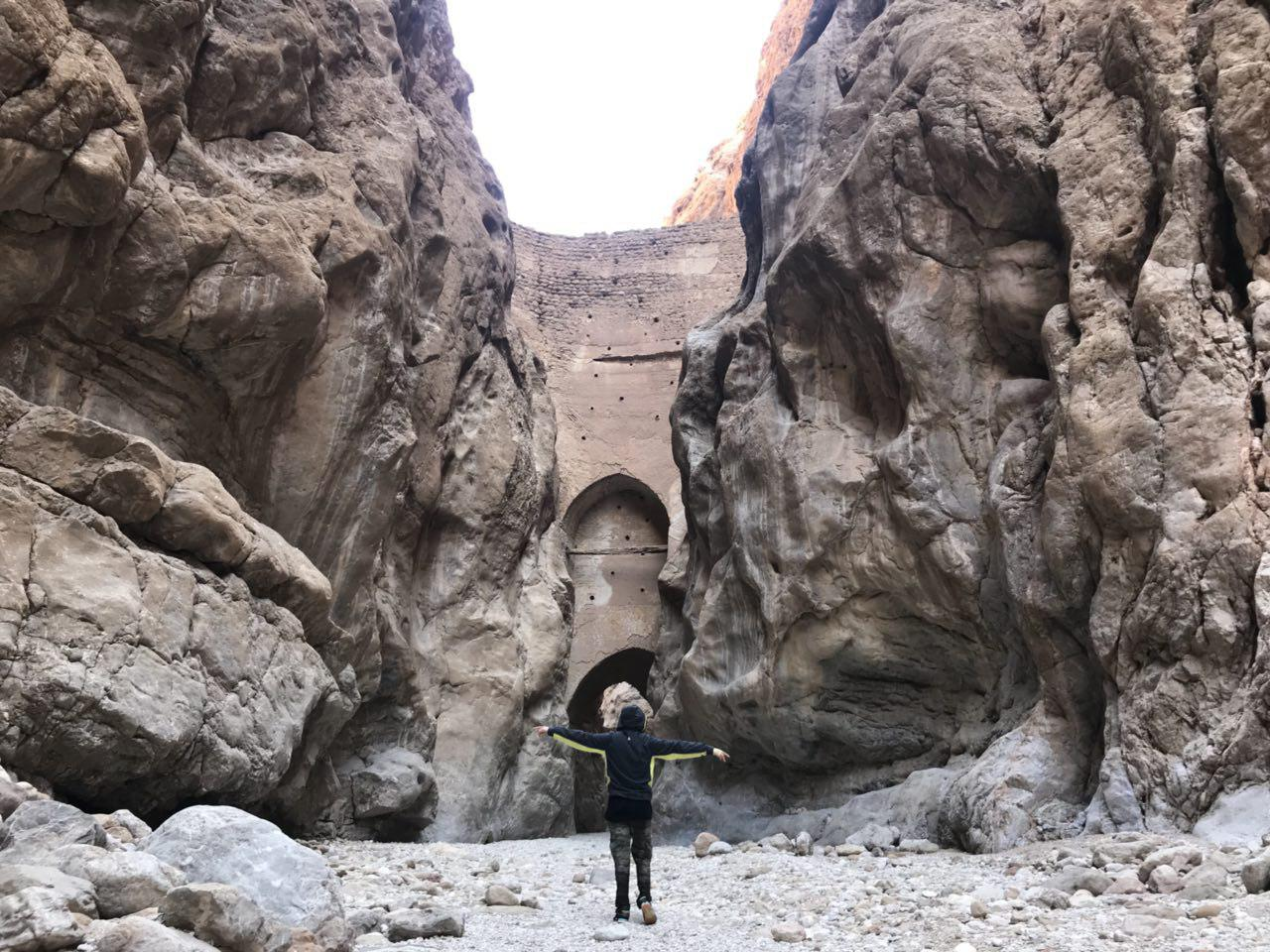
Tabas

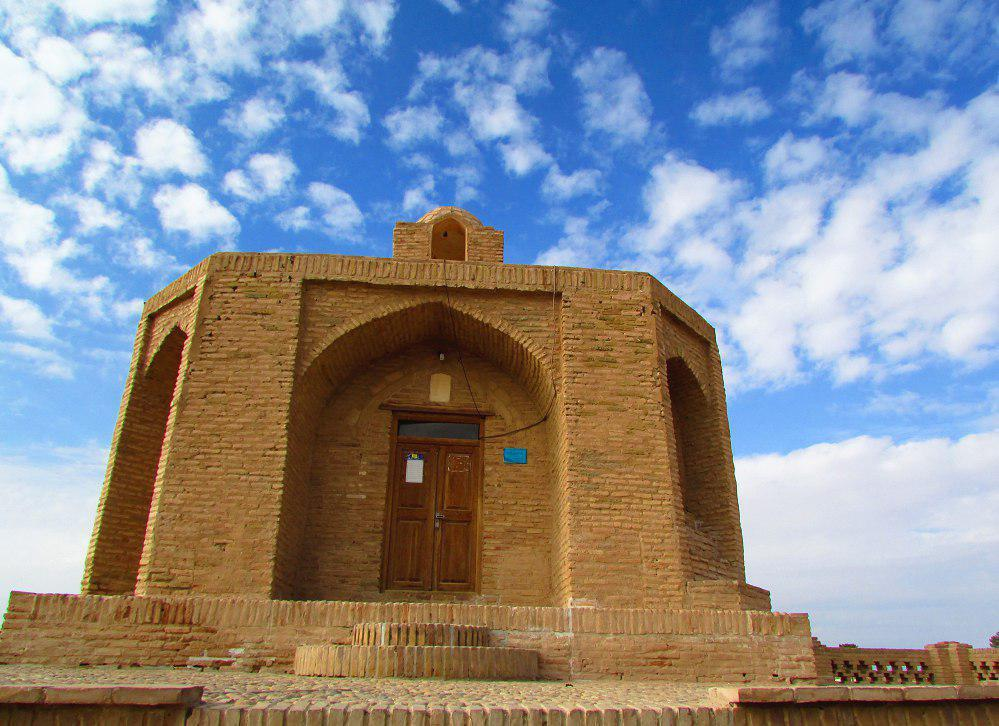
Khusf

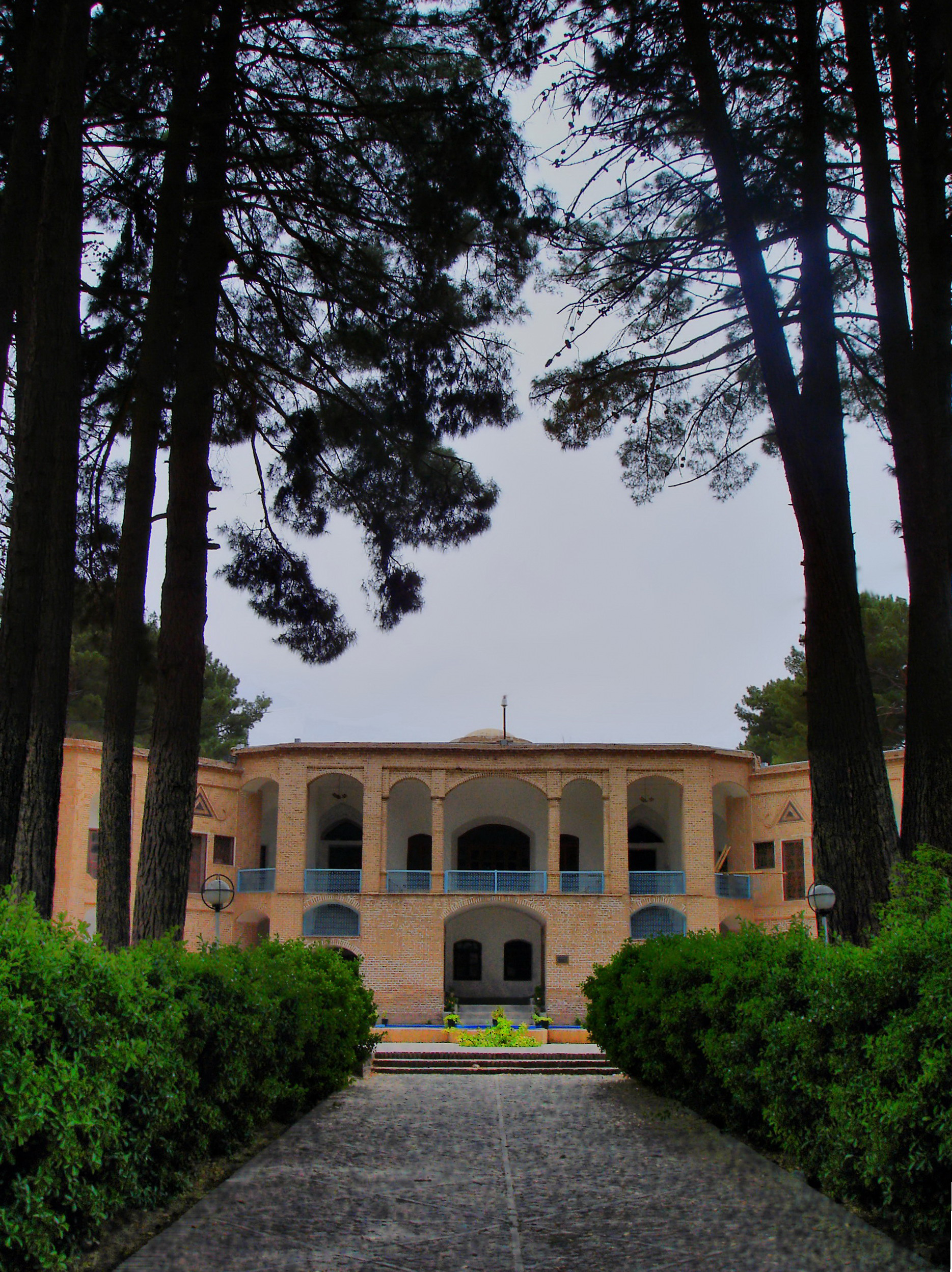
Akbarieh Garden

== See also ==
- Khorasan
- North Khorasan
- Razavi Khorasan
