= Gazik =

Gazik or Gezik (Persian: گزيك) may refer to:

- Gezik, Razavi Khorasan Province
- Gazik, Birjand, South Khorasan Province
- Gazik, Darmian, South Khorasan Province
- Gazik District, in South Khorasan Province
- Gazik Rural District, in South Khorasan Province
