= Birjand Castle =

Castle in Birjand, Iran

- قلعه بیرجند
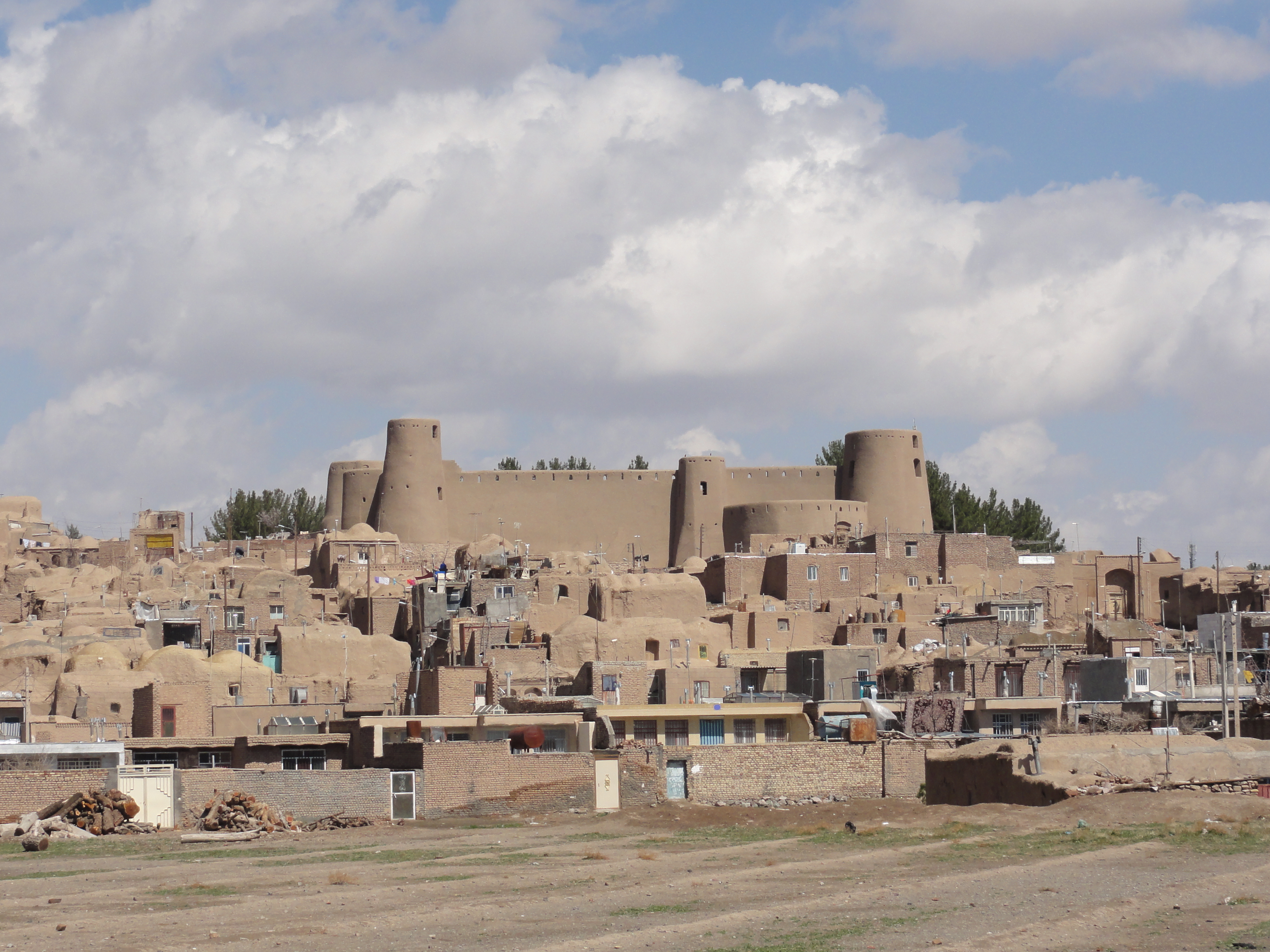
- Interactive map of the Birjand Castle area

General information
- Type: Castle
- Architectural style: Iranian architecture
- Location: Birjand, South Khorasan province, Iran
- Coordinates: 32.8828°N 59.2053°E

Birjand Castle is a castle in Birjand, and is one of the attractions of Birjand County. The castle was constructed during the Safavid and Qajar eras.
