= Kushk Complex =

Iranian national heritage site

- حمام کوشک فردوس
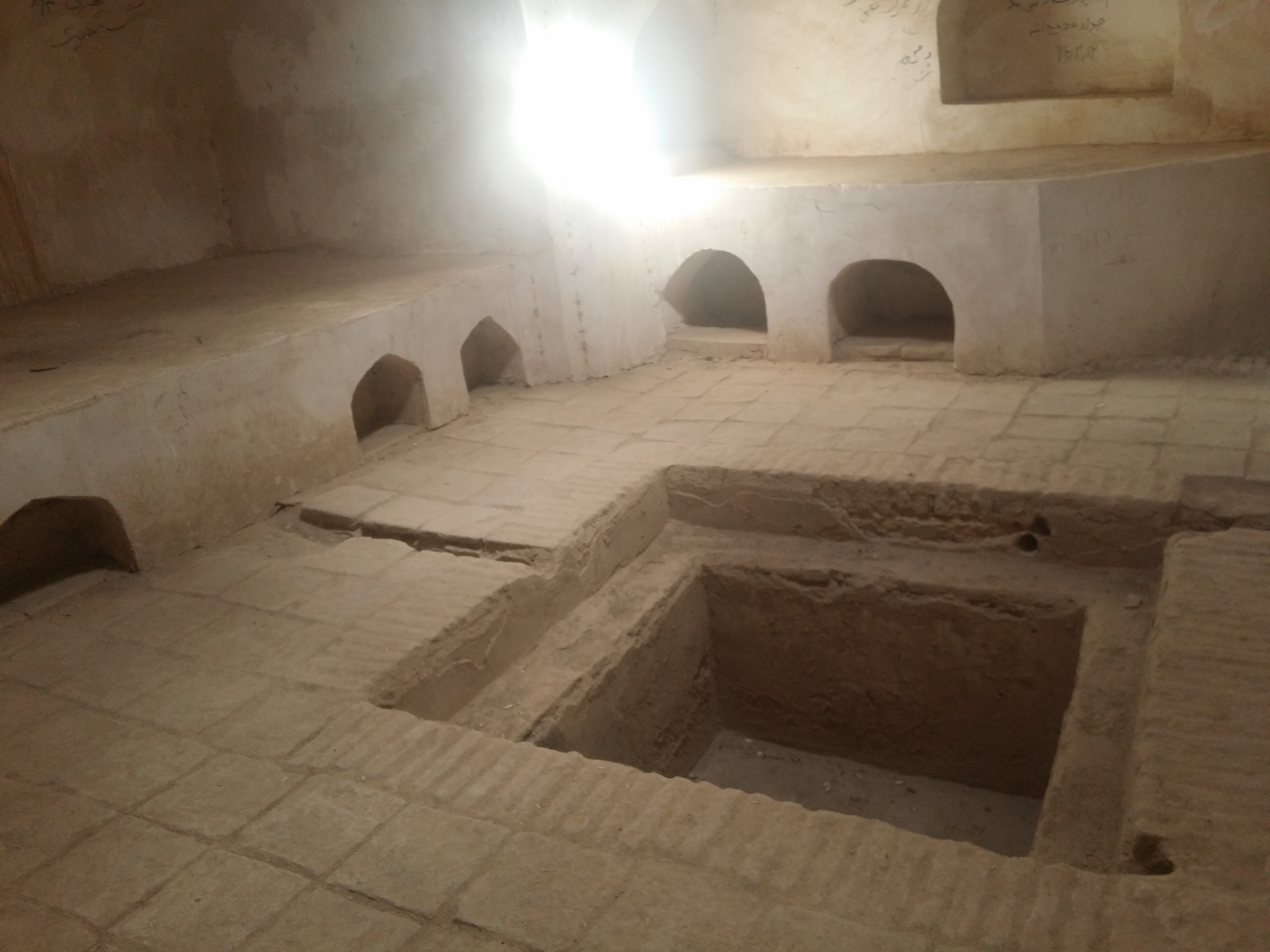

- Location of the complex in Iran

Religion
- Affiliation: Shia Islam
- Ecclesiastical or organisational status: Mosque, hammam, bathroom, Ab anbar
- Status: Active

Location
- Location: Ferdows, Ferdows County, South Khorasan Province
- Country: Iran
- Interactive map of Kushk Complex
- Coordinates: 34°0′11″N 58°9′37″E

Architecture
- Type: Islamic architecture
- Style: Safavid style

Specifications
- Dome: One
- Materials: Bricks; mortar

Iran National Heritage List
- Official name: Kushk Hammam
- Type: Built
- Designated: 26 June 2005
- Reference no.: 11990
- Conservation organization: Ministry of Cultural Heritage, Tourism and Handicrafts

The Kushk Complex, also known as the Kushk Hammam (Persian: حمام کوشک فردوس; Arabic: حمام كوشك (فردوس)) is an Islamic funerary complex, that consists of a mosque, a hammam, bathroom and an Ab anbar, located in Ferdows, South Khorasan province, Iran. The Kushk Mosque is the oldest mosque in South Khorasan and, based on the evidence of its existing architecture, its original structure dates back to the early centuries of Islam.

The complex was added to the Iran National Heritage List on 26 June 2005, administered by the Ministry of Cultural Heritage, Tourism and Handicrafts.

== Gallery ==
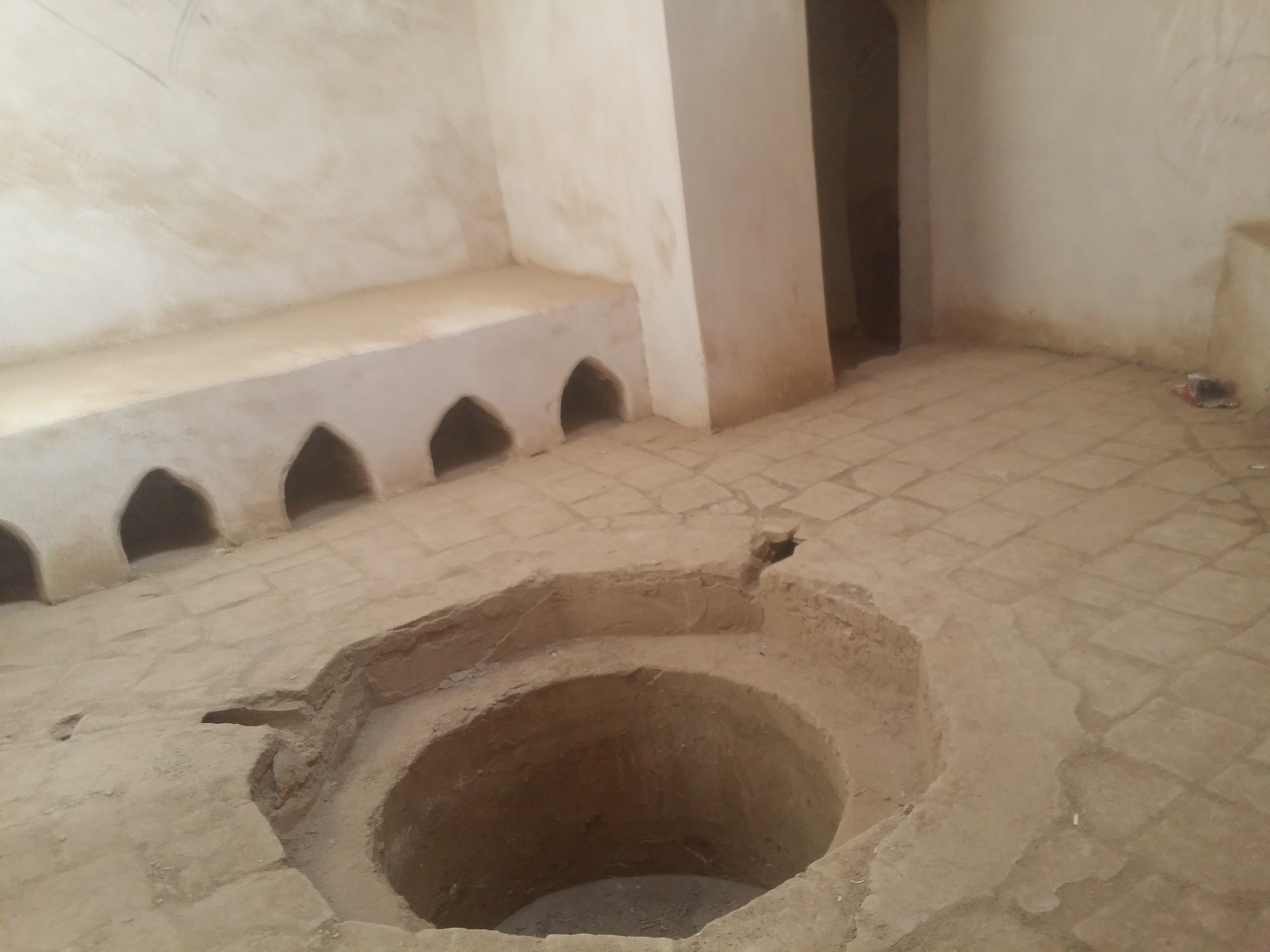

== See also ==
- Shia Islam in Iran
- List of mausoleums in Iran
- List of mosques in Iran
