= Artur Kasperek =

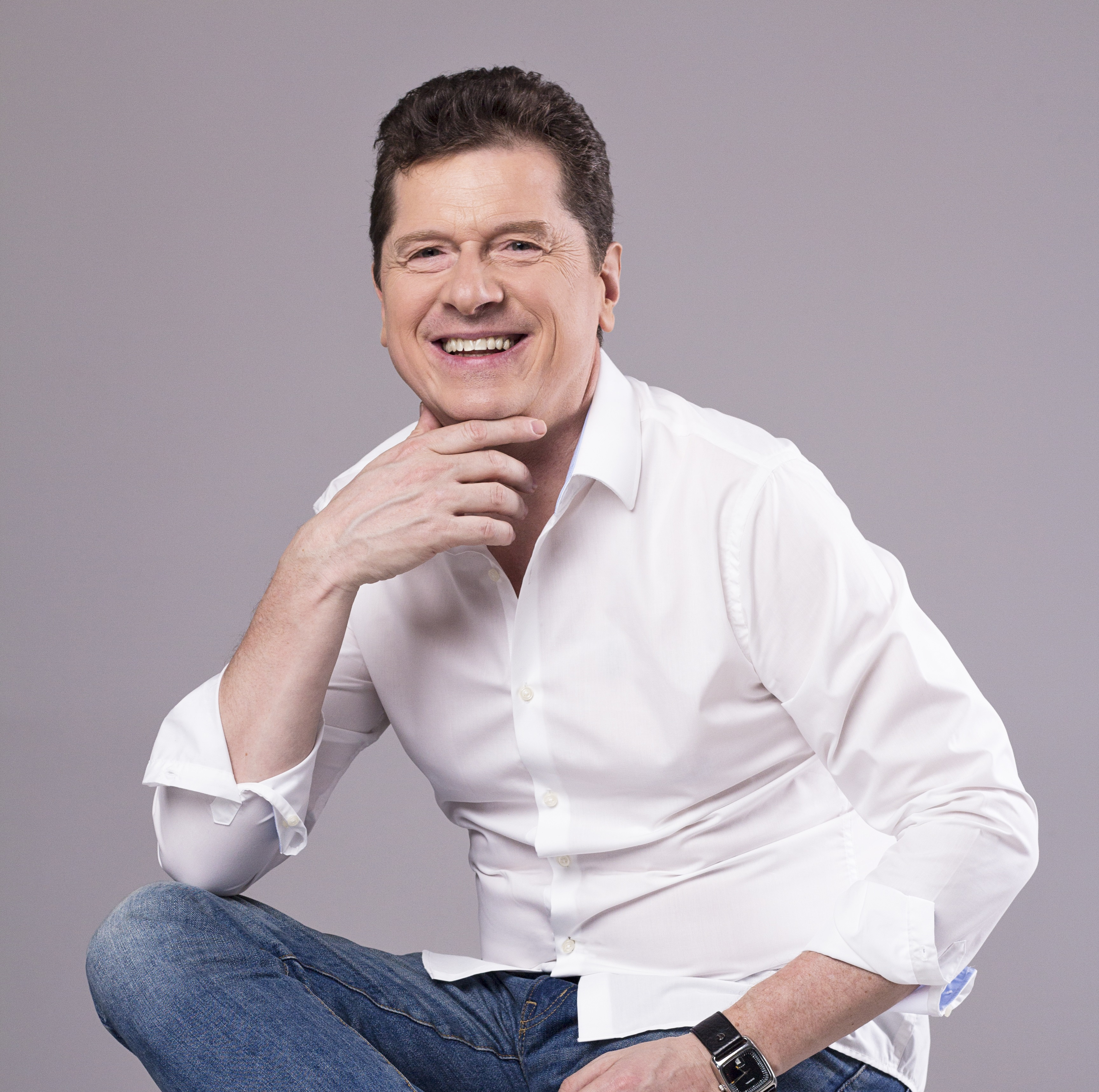

Background information
- Born: 17 October 1966 (age 59); Lublin, Poland
- Genres: Classical
- Instrument: bassoon

Artur Kasperek (born 17 October 1966 in Lublin, Poland) is a distinguished Polish bassoonist and academic.

== Life ==
He studied at the Karol Lipiński Secondary Music School in Lublin under Grażyna Woć-Kowalik, and later graduated from the Fryderyk Chopin Academy of Music (now University of Music) in Warsaw in the class of Professor Bogumił Gadawski; additionally, he refined his skills under Klaus Thünemann.

Kasperek has held prominent positions as a soloist and principal bassoon: among others, he was soloist with the Polish Chamber Philharmonic (1990–1994), first bassoonist of the Polish Festival Orchestra under Krystian Zimerman in 1999—where he participated in award-winning recordings of Chopin’s piano concertos for Deutsche Grammophon—and he currently heads the wind instruments section of the Orchestra of the Great Theatre – National Opera (since 1992); he is also soloist with Sinfonietta Cracovia (since 1994) and the Polish Radio Orchestra. Active as a chamber musician, he collaborates with ensembles such as Concerto Avenna, Ensemble de Narol, Sinfonia Varsovia, New Art Ensemble, and Gruppo di Tempera.

In academia, Kasperek earned a doctorate in 2012 and received habilitation in 2016. Since then, he has served as Assistant Professor and later as Associate Professor at the Chair of Wind Instruments at the Fryderyk Chopin University of Music in Warsaw, eventually becoming head of that chair. He is known for his pedagogical work—ranking highly among Poland’s bassoon educators—with students who have achieved success in competitions and orchestral auditions; he also leads masterclasses and serves on juries.
