= Gazik, Birjand =

Gazik گزیک
- Village
- Location within Iran
- Coordinates: 33°01′33.8″N 59°27′32″E
- Country: Iran
- Province: South Khorasan
- County: Birjand
- Bakhsh: Central
- Rural District: Kahshang

Population (2016)
  - Total: 15
- Time zone: UTC+3:30 (IRST)
  - Summer (DST): UTC+4:30 (IRDT)

Gazik (Persian: گزيك, also romanized as Gazīk) is a village in Kahshang Rural District, in the Central District of Birjand County, South Khorasan Province, Iran. At the 2016 census, its population was 15, with 4 families.
