= Kazimierz J. Kasperek =

Kazimierz J. Kasperek (1916 – June 28, 2008), nicknamed Kazik, was a Polish Navy officer who served during World War II. He eventually emigrated to the United States, where he published his memoirs.

== Biography ==
Kazimierz J. Kasperek was born in 1916 in Częstochowa, Poland and enlisted as a volunteer in the Polish Navy on February 1, 1936. After two years of training, World War II broke out with the Invasion of Poland. Kazik served defending the port of Gdynia and the Peninsula of Hel. Kazik was among the last fighters to be taken by the Germans as a prisoner of war. He escaped to the Netherlands and made his way to Paris where he was sent to London to unite with the Polish Navy-in-Exile and the Allied Forces where he rose to the rank of Chief Petty Officer. Kazik Kasperek was at the helm in constant sea battles and special operations, including hunts for U-boats, the Dunkirk evacuation, convoys, and the Battle of Malta where his ship the O.R.P. Kujawiak was sunk. During his service until the end of World War II, May 8, 1945, Kazik crossed the Atlantic Ocean at least 26 times while escorting convoys. After the war he was promoted to Lieutenant Commander.

Despite contributing greatly to the Allied effort, the Polish Navy and free Poland fell victim to post-war international dealings that led to their political obliteration under the Potsdam and Yalta agreements.

Eventually, Kasperek and his wife and two daughters became U.S. Citizens. After Poland became free again, he wrote Kazik's Polish Navy, the memoir of his adventures which range from having ships blown out from under him to falling in love with his Irene, the lady he married.

Kazimierz died peacefully on June 28, 2008 at his home in Floridana Beach, having lived 92 adventurous years.

== Medals ==
For his service during World War II, Kazimierz received the following medals:

=== Awarded by Poland ===
- Cross of Valor (Krzyż Walecznych)
- Distinguished Service Cross with the Polish Eagle
- Navy Medal for War 1939-1945 (Medal Morski za Wojne 1939-1945)
- Freedom Fighter Medal
- Cross of September Campaign 1939 (Krzyz Kampanii Wrzesniowej 1939)
- Honorable Service Medal
- 1939 POLSKIE SIŁY-ZBROJNE-NA-ZACHODZIE 1945

(1939 Polish Armed Forces-in-the-West 1945)

=== Awarded by England ===
- War Medal 1939 to 1945
- War Star 1939 to 1945
- Atlantic Campaign Star
- Africa Campaign Star
- Italy Campaign Star
- France and Germany Star
- Defense Medal 1939 to 1945

=== Awarded by Malta ===
- George Cross Medal

=== Awarded by France ===
- Dunkirk Campaign Medal
- War Medal 1939 to 1945 (Médaille commémorative de la Guerre 1939-1945)

=== Awarded by Norway ===
- War Medal 1939 to 1945 (Krigsmedaljen)
