= Ebrahimabad =

Ebrahimabad (Persian: ابراهيم اباد), also rendered as Ibrahimabad, may refer to the following villages in Iran:

== Alborz Province ==
- Ebrahimabad, Alborz

== Ardabil Province ==
- Ebrahimabad-e Ajirlu, a village in Parsabad County
- Ebrahimabad-e Jadid, Ardabil, a village in Parsabad County

== Fars Province ==
- Ebrahimabad, Marvdasht, a village in Marvdasht County
- Ebrahimabad, Sepidan, a village in Sepidan County

== Gilan Province ==
- Ebrahimabad, Gilan, a village in Rasht County

== Golestan Province ==
- Ebrahimabad, Bandar-e Gaz, a village in Bandar-e Gaz County
- Ebrahimabad, Gorgan, a village in Gorgan County

== Hamadan Province ==
- Ebrahimabad, Hamadan, a village in Famenin County

== Isfahan Province ==
- Ebrahimabad, Isfahan, a village in Khur and Biabanak County

== Kerman Province ==
=== Arzuiyeh County ===
- Ebrahimabad, Arzuiyeh, a village in Arzuiyeh County
- Ebrahimabad, Vakilabad, a village in Arzuiyeh County

=== Fahraj County ===
- Ebrahimabad 1, a village in Fahraj County
- Ebrahimabad 2, a village in Fahraj County
- Ebrahimabad-e Deh Gavi, a village in Fahraj County
- Ebrahimabad-e Jadid, Kerman, a village in Fahraj County

=== Jiroft County ===
- Ebrahimabad, Jiroft, a village in Jiroft County

=== Kerman County ===
- Ebrahimabad, Shahdad, a village in Kerman County

=== Narmashir County ===
- Ebrahimabad, Narmashir, a village in Narmashir County
- Ebrahimabad, Rud Ab, a village in Narmashir County

=== Rabor County ===
- Ebrahimabad, Rabor, a village in Rabor County

=== Rafsanjan County ===
- Ebrahimabad-e Hajji, a village in Rafsanjan County
- Ebrahimabad-e Shur, a village in Rafsanjan County

=== Shahr-e Babak County ===
- Ebrahimabad, Shahr-e Babak, a village in Shahr-e Babak County

=== Sirjan County ===
- Ebrahimabad, Sirjan, a village in Sirjan County
- Ebrahimabad, Zeydabad, a village in Sirjan County

=== Zarand County ===
- Ebrahimabad, Vahdat, a village in Zarand County

== Khuzestan Province ==
- Ebrahimabad, Khuzestan

== Kurdistan Province ==
- Ebrahimabad, Bijar, a village in Bijar County
- Ebrahimabad, Dehgolan, a village in Dehgolan County
- Ebrahimabad, Divandarreh, a village in Divandarreh County
- Ebrahimabad-e Olya va Sofla, a village in Divandarreh County
- Ebrahimabad, Kamyaran, a village in Kamyaran County
- Ebrahimabad, Sarvabad, a village in Sarvabad County

== Lorestan Province ==
- Ebrahimabad, Lorestan
- Ebrahimabad, alternate name of Rahimabad-e Yek

== Markazi Province ==
- Ebrahimabad, Mashhad-e Miqan, a village in Arak County
- Ebrahimabad, Moshkabad, a village in Arak County
- Ebrahimabad, Khondab, a village in Khondab County
- Ebrahimabad, Saveh, a village in Saveh County
- Ebrahimabad, Zarandieh, a village in Zarandieh County

== Qazvin Province ==
- Ebrahimabad, Abyek, Qazvin
- Ebrahimabad, Basharyat, Qazvin
- Ebrahimabad, Buin Zahra, Qazvin
- Ebrahimabad Rural District

== Razavi Khorasan Province ==
- Ebrahimabad, Bajestan, a village in Bajestan County
- Ebrahimabad, Bardaskan, a village in Bardaskan County
- Ebrahimabad, Chenaran, a village in Chenaran County
- Ebrahimabad, Firuzeh, a village in Firuzeh County
- Ebrahimabad Abu Talab, a village in Jowayin County
- Ebrahimabad-e Bala Jowayin, a village in Jowayin County
- Ebrahimabad, Khalilabad, a village in Khalilabad County
- Ebrahimabad, Khoshab, a village in Khoshab County
- Ebrahimabad, Mashhad, a village in Mashhad County
- Ebrahimabad, Nishapur, a village in Nishapur County
- Ebrahimabad, Zeberkhan, a village in Nishapur County
- Ebrahimabad-e Muri, a village in Nishapur County
- Ebrahimabad, Rashtkhvar, a village in Rashtkhvar County
- Ebrahimabad, Sabzevar, a village in Sabzevar County
- Ebrahimabad, Sarakhs, a village in Sarakhs County
- Ebrahimabad, Torbat-e Jam, a village in Torbat-e Jam County

== Semnan Province ==
- Ebrahimabad-e Olya, a village in Shahrud County
- Ebrahimabad-e Sofla, a village in Shahrud County

== Sistan and Baluchestan Province ==
- Ebrahimabad, Hirmand, a village in Hirmand County
- Ebrahimabad (28°22′ N 60°28′ E), Khash, a village in Khash County

== South Khorasan Province ==
- Ebrahimabad, Darmian, a village in Darmian County
- Ebrahimabad, Ferdows, a village in Ferdows County
- Ebrahimabad, Nehbandan, a village in Nehbandan County
- Ebrahimabad, Shusef, a village in Nehbandan County
- Ebrahimabad, Qaen, a village in Qaen County
- Ebrahimabad, Sarbisheh, a village in Sarbisheh County
- Ebrahimabad, Tabas, a village in Tabas County
- Ebrahimabad-e Bala, a village in Tabas County
- Ebrahimabad-e Pain, a village in Tabas County

== Tehran Province ==
- Ebrahimabad, Tehran, a village in Pakdasht County
- Ebrahimabad, Malard, a village in Malard County
- Ebrahimabad, Pishva, a village in Pishva County
- Ebrahimabad, Rey, a village in Rey County
- Ebrahimabad, Shahriar, a village in Shahriar County
- Ebrahimabad, Varamin, a village in Varamin County

== West Azerbaijan Province ==
- Ebrahimabad, West Azerbaijan, a village in Miandoab County
- Ebrahimabad, Sardasht, a village in Sardasht County

== Yazd Province ==
=== Ashkezar County ===
- Ebrahimabad, Ashkezar, a village in Ashkezar County

=== Mehriz County ===
- Ebrahimabad, Mehriz, a village in Mehriz County
- Ebrahimabad-e Cheshmeh Nazer, a village in Mehriz County

=== Taft County ===
- Ebrahimabad, Taft, a village in Taft County
- Ebrahimabad, Garizat, a village in Taft County
- Ebrahimabad, alternate name of Mir Hashem, a village in Taft County

== Zanjan Province ==
- Ebrahimabad, Khodabandeh, a village in Khodabandeh County
- Ebrahimabad, Mahneshan, a village in Mahneshan County
- Ebrahimabad, Zanjan, a village in Zanjan County
- Ebrahimabad, Zanjanrud, a village in Zanjan County
