= Yusefabad =

Yusefabad or Yusofabad or Yoosef Abad or Yusafabad or Yoosof Abad (Persian: يوسف آباد), also rendered as Yusufabad

== Chaharmahal and Bakhtiari Province ==
- Yusefabad, Chaharmahal and Bakhtiari, a village in Ardal County

== East Azerbaijan Province ==
- Yusefabad, Bostanabad, a village in Bostanabad County
- Yusofabad, Shabestar, a village in Shabestar County

== Fars Province ==
- Yusefabad, Jahrom, a village in Jahrom County
- Yusefabad, Kazerun, a village in Kazerun County

== Gilan Province ==
- Yusefabad, Amlash, a village in Amlash County
- Yusefabad, Rankuh, a village in Amlash County
- Yusefabad, Rasht, a village in Rasht County

== Hamadan Province ==
- Yusefabad, Hamadan, a village in Asadabad County

== Kerman Province ==
- Yusefabad, Anbarabad, a village in Anbarabad County
- Yusefabad, Fahraj, a village in Fahraj County
- Yusefabad-e Pain, a village in Fahraj County
- Yusefabad-e Salar, a village in Fahraj County
- Yusefabad, Manujan, a village in Manujan County
- Yusefabad, Eslamiyeh, a village in Rafsanjan County
- Yusefabad, Koshkuiyeh, a village in Rafsanjan County
- Yusefabad, Ravar, a village in Ravar County
- Yusefabad, Madvarat, a village in Shahr-e Babak County

== Kohgiluyeh and Boyer-Ahmad Province ==
- Yusefabad, Kohgiluyeh and Boyer-Ahmad, a village in Boyer-Ahmad County

== Kurdistan Province ==
- Yusofabad, Kurdistan, a village in Kamyaran County

== Lorestan Province ==
- Yusefabad, Dorud
- Yusefabad, Kuhdasht
- Yusefabad Cham Chal
- Yusefabad-e Abdolmeni

== Markazi Province ==
- Yusefabad, Markazi, a village in Saveh County

== Mazandaran Province ==
- Yusefabad, Amol, a village in Amol County
- Yusefabad, Mahmudabad, a village in Mahmudabad County
- Yusefabad, Tonekabon, a village in Tonekabon County

== Qazvin Province ==
- Yusefabad, Qazvin

== Razavi Khorasan Province ==
- Yusefabad, Chenaran, a village in Chenaran County
- Yusefabad, Firuzeh, a village in Firuzeh County
- Yusefabad, Jowayin, a village in Jowayin County
- Yusefabad, Nishapur, a village in Nishapur County
- Yusefabad, Quchan, a village in Quchan County

== Sistan and Baluchestan Province ==
- Yusefabad, Irandegan, a village in Khash County
- Yusefabad-e Tudak, a village in Khash County

== South Khorasan Province ==
- Yusefabad-e Bam, a village in Tabas County

== Tehran Province ==
- Yusefabad-e Khaleseh, a village in Varamin County
- Yusefabad-e Qavam, a village in Malard County
- Yusefabad-e Seyrafi, a village in Shahriar County

== West Azerbaijan Province ==
- Yusefabad, Chaldoran, a village in Chaldoran County
- Yusefabad, Khoy, a village in Khoy County
- Yusefabad, Urmia, a village in Urmia County

== Zanjan Province ==
- Yusefabad, Abhar, a village in Abhar County
- Yusefabad, Mahneshan, a village in Mahneshan County
