= Jahanabad =

Jahanabad or Jehanabad may refer to:

== Bangladesh ==
- Jahanabad, an alternative name for Khulna division
  - Jahanabad Cantonment, military cantonment in Khulna
- Jahanabad Union, a union council in Mohanpur, Rajshahi district

== India ==
- Kora Jahanabad, Uttar Pradesh, India
  - Jahanabad (Assembly constituency)
- Jahanabad, Pilibhit, a nagar panchayat in Pilibhit district, Uttar Pradesh, India
- Jehanabad, a town in Bihar, India
  - Jehanabad district in Bihar, India
  - Jahanabad (Lok Sabha constituency)
  - Jehanabad - Of Love & War, Indian crime thriller web series
- Jahanabad, Lucknow, a village in Uttar Pradesh

== Iran ==
=== Fars Province ===
- Jahanabad, Kazerun, a village in Kazerun County
- Jahanabad, Kharameh, a village in Kharameh County
- Jahanabad, Marvdasht, a village in Marvdasht County
- Jahanabad, Neyriz, a village in Neyriz County

=== Hamadan Province ===
- Jahanabad, Famenin, a village in Famenin County
- Jahanabad, Nahavand, a village in Nahavand County

=== Isfahan Province ===
- Jahanabad, Isfahan, a village in Nain County

=== Kerman Province ===
- Jahanabad-e Bala, Kerman, a village in Fahraj County
- Jahanabad-e Deh Nazer, a village in Fahraj County
- Jahanabad-e Pain, a village in Fahraj County
- Jahanabad, Rafsanjan, a village in Rafsanjan County
- Jahanabad, Rigan, a village in Rigan County

=== Kermanshah Province ===
- Jahanabad, Kermanshah, a village in Kermanshah County

=== Kohgiluyeh and Boyer-Ahmad Province ===
- Jahanabad-e Baraftab, a village in Boyer-Ahmad County
- Jahanabad-e Markazi, a village in Boyer-Ahmad County
- Jahanabad-e Sofla, Kohgiluyeh and Boyer-Ahmad, a village in Boyer-Ahmad County

=== Lorestan Province ===
- Jahanabad, Borujerd, a village in Borujerd County
- Jahanabad, Dorud, a village in Dorud County
- Jahanabad, Khorramabad, a village in Khorramabad County
- Jahanabad, Selseleh, a village in Selseleh County
- Jahanabad, Firuzabad, a village in Selseleh County

=== Markazi Province ===
- Jahanabad, Markazi, a village in Mahallat County

=== Qazvin Province ===
- Jahanabad, Zahray-ye Pain, a village in Buin Zahra County
- Jahanabad, Takestan, a village in Takestan County

=== Razavi Khorasan Province ===
- Jahanabad, Dargaz, a village in Dargaz County
- Jahanabad, Nishapur, a village in Nishapur County
- Jahanabad, Bujgan, a village in Torbat-e Jam County
- Jahanabad, Salehabad, a village in Torbat-e Jam County
- Jahanabad, Torbat-e Jam, a village in Torbat-e Jam County
- Jahanabad-e Maleki, a village in Torbat-e Jam County

=== Semnan Province ===
- Jahanabad, Meyami, a village in Meyami County

=== Sistan and Baluchestan Province ===
- Jahanabad-e Sofla, Sistan and Baluchestan, a village in Hirmand County
- Jahanabad-e Sofla, Sistan and Baluchestan, a village in Hirmand County
- Jahanabad Rural District, in Hirmand County

=== South Khorasan Province ===
- Jahanabad, South Khorasan, a village in Sarayan County

=== Tehran Province ===
- Jahanabad, Tehran, a village in Tehran County
- Jahanabad, Varamin, a village in Varamin County

=== Yazd Province ===
- Jahanabad, Meybod, a village in Meybod County
- Jahanabad-e Meybod Industrial Estate, a village in Meybod County
- Jahanabad, Taft, a village in Taft County

== Pakistan ==
- Jahanabad (Karachi), one of the neighbourhoods of SITE Town in Karachi, Sindh, Pakistan
- Jahanabad (Sargodha), a Tehsil in Sargodha, Pakistan
- Jehanabad (Pakistan), at Swat District, in the Khyber Pakhtunkhwa Province of Pakistan.
