= Shurabad =

Shurabad or Shuraabad or Suraabad or Shoor Abad (Persian: شورآباد, Azerbaijani: Şuraabad) may refer to:

== Armenia ==
- Paghakn

== Azerbaijan ==
- Şuraabad, Agdam
- Şuraabad, Khizi
- Şuraabad, Nakhchivan

== Iran ==
=== Fars Province ===
- Shurabad, Fars, a village in Fasa County

=== Kerman Province ===
- Shurabad, Kerman
- Shurabad, Fahraj, Kerman Province
- Shurabad-e Mehrab Khan, Fahraj County, Kerman Province
- Shurabad, Jiroft, Kerman Province
- Shurabad, Narmashir, Kerman Province

=== Kermanshah Province ===
- Shurabad, Kermanshah, a village in Kermanshah County
- Shurabad, Sonqor, a village in Sonqor County

=== Lorestan Province ===
- Shurabad, Lorestan
- Shurabad, Aligudarz, Lorestan Province

=== Sistan and Baluchestan Province ===
- Shurabad, Khash, a village in Khash County

=== South Khorasan Province ===
- Shurabad, South Khorasan
- Shurabad, Birjand, South Khorasan Province

=== West Azerbaijan Province ===
- Shurabad, West Azerbaijan, a village in Mahabad County

== See also ==
- Sarvabad
