= Emamiyeh =

Emamiyeh (Persian: اماميه) may refer to various places in Iran:

- Emamiyeh, Golestan
- Emamiyeh, Anar, Kerman Province
- Emamiyeh, Fahraj, Kerman Province
- Emamiyeh 1, Fahraj County, Kerman Province
- Emamiyeh, Kermanshah
- Emamiyeh-e Olya, Kermanshah Province
- Emamiyeh-e Sofla, Kermanshah Province
- Emamiyeh, Mazandaran
- Emamiyeh, Razavi Khorasan
- Emamiyeh, Sistan and Baluchestan
