= Janabad, Iran =

Janabad or Jonabad (Persian: جان اباد) in Iran may refer to:

- Janabad, Hamadan
- Janabad, Isfahan
- Janabad, Kohgiluyeh and Boyer-Ahmad
- Janabad, Razavi Khorasan
- Janabad-e Alijafar, Sistan and Baluchestan Province
