= Jahanabad-e Bala =

Jahanabad-e Bala (Persian: جَهانابادِ بالا) may refer to:

- Jahanabad-e Bala, Golestan
- Jahanabad-e Bala, Kerman
- Jahanabad-e Bala, Kohgiluyeh and Boyer-Ahmad
- Jahanabad-e Bala, Sistan and Baluchestan
- Jahanabad-e Bala, Tehran

== See also ==
- Jahanabad-e Olya (disambiguation)
