= Dashtabad =

Dashtabad (Persian: دشت اباد) may refer to:

- Dashtabad, Hamadan
- Dashtabad-e Olya, Ilam Province
- Dashtabad-e Sofla, Ilam Province
- Dashtabad, Fahraj, Kerman Province
- Dashtabad, Narmashir, Kerman Province
- Dashtabad, Yazd
- Dashtabad, Uzbekistan,
