= Borj-e Akram =

Village in Kerman province, Iran

Borj-e Akram Persian: برج اكرم
- Village
- Location within Iran
- Coordinates: 28°48′46″N 58°50′53″E
- Country: Iran
- Province: Kerman
- County: Fahraj
- District: Central
- Rural District: Borj-e Akram

Population (2016)
  - Total: 4,281
- Time zone: UTC+3:30 (IRST)

Borj-e Akram (Persian: برج اكرم) (Note: Also romanized as Borj Akram; also known as Borj) is a village in, and the capital of, Borj-e Akram Rural District of the Central District of Fahraj County, Kerman province, Iran.

== Demographics ==
=== Population ===
At the time of the 2006 National Census, the village's population was 1,160 in 240 households, when it was in the former Fahraj District of Bam County. The following census in 2011 counted 3,829 people in 1,015 households, by which time the district had been separated from the county in the establishment of Fahraj County. The rural district was transferred to the new Central District. The 2016 census measured the population of the village as 4,281 people in 918 households. It was the most populous village in its rural district.
