= Nuriyeh =

Nuriyeh نوريه
- Village
- Location within Iran
- Coordinates: 28°51′59″N 58°57′33″E
- Country: Iran
- Province: Kerman
- County: Fahraj
- Bakhsh: Central
- Rural District: Fahraj

Population (2006)
  - Total: 248
- Time zone: UTC+3:30 (IRST)
  - Summer (DST): UTC+4:30 (IRDT)

Nuriyeh (Persian: نوريه, also Romanized as Nūrīyeh) is a village in Fahraj Rural District, in the Central District of Fahraj County, Kerman Province, Iran. At the 2006 census, its population was 248, in 49 families.
