= Aliabad-e Vaziri =

Aliabad-e Vaziri علي ابادوزيري
- Village
- Location within Iran
- Coordinates: 28°51′46″N 58°55′54″E
- Country: Iran
- Province: Kerman
- County: Fahraj
- Bakhsh: Central
- Rural District: Borj-e Akram

Population (2006)
  - Total: 380
- Time zone: UTC+3:30 (IRST)
  - Summer (DST): UTC+4:30 (IRDT)

Aliabad-e Vaziri (Persian: علي ابادوزيري, also Romanized as ‘Alīābād-e Vazīrī) is a village in Borj-e Akram Rural District, in the Central District of Fahraj County, Kerman Province, Iran. At the 2006 census, its population was 380, in 89 families.
