= Esmailabad, Fahraj =

Village in Kerman province, Iran

Esmailabad Persian: اسماعيل اباد
- Village
- Location within Iran
- Coordinates: 28°47′17″N 59°04′47″E
- Country: Iran
- Province: Kerman
- County: Fahraj
- District: Negin Kavir
- Rural District: Negin Kavir

Population (2016)
  - Total: 4,769
- Time zone: UTC+3:30 (IRST)

Esmailabad (Persian: اسماعيل اباد) (Note: Also romanized as Esmā‘īlābād) is a village in Negin Kavir Rural District of Negin Kavir District, Fahraj County, Kerman province, Iran.

== Demographics ==
=== Population ===
At the time of the 2006 National Census, the village's population was 1,901 in 422 households, when it was in Chahdegal Rural District of the former Rigan District of Bam County. The following census in 2011 counted 4,347 people in 1,007 households, by which time the rural district had been separated from the county in the establishment of Fahraj County. It was transferred to the new Negin Kavir District, and Esmailabad was transferred to the Negin Kavir Rural District created in the district. The 2016 census measured the population of the village as 4,769 people in 1,055 households. It was the most populous village in its rural district.
