= Esmatabad =

Esmatabad or Ismatabad (Persian: عصمت اباد) may refer to:

- Esmatabad, Kerman
- Esmatabad, Qazvin
- Esmatabad, Razavi Khorasan
- Esmatabad, Quchan, Razavi Khorasan Province
- Esmatabad, Tehran
- Esmatabad, Mehriz, Yazd Province
- Esmatabad, Taft, Taft Province
