= Seh Kahur =

Seh Kahur سه كهور
- Village
- Location within Iran
- Coordinates: 28°50′18″N 59°01′15″E
- Country: Iran
- Province: Kerman
- County: Fahraj
- Bakhsh: Negin Kavir
- Rural District: Chahdegal

Population (2006)
  - Total: 1,548
- Time zone: UTC+3:30 (IRST)
  - Summer (DST): UTC+4:30 (IRDT)

Seh Kahur (Persian: سه كهور, also Romanized as Seh Kahūr) is a village in Chahdegal Rural District, Negin Kavir District, Fahraj County, Kerman Province, Iran. At the 2006 census, its population was 1,548, in 397 families.
