= Deh-e Esmail =

Deh-e Esmail ده اسماعيل
- Village
- Location within Iran
- Coordinates: 28°49′07″N 59°14′58″E
- Country: Iran
- Province: Kerman
- County: Fahraj
- Bakhsh: Negin Kavir
- Rural District: Chahdegal

Population (2006)
  - Total: 187
- Time zone: UTC+3:30 (IRST)
  - Summer (DST): UTC+4:30 (IRDT)

Deh-e Esmail (Persian: ده اسماعيل, also Romanized as Deh-e Esmā‘īl) is a village in Chahdegal Rural District, Negin Kavir District, Fahraj County, Kerman Province, Iran. At the 2006 census, its population was 187, in 39 families.
