= Salehabad, Fahraj =

Salehabad صالح اباد
- Village
- Location within Iran
- Coordinates: 28°44′01″N 58°58′58″E
- Country: Iran
- Province: Kerman
- County: Fahraj
- Bakhsh: Negin Kavir
- Rural District: Chahdegal

Population (2006)
  - Total: 78
- Time zone: UTC+3:30 (IRST)
  - Summer (DST): UTC+4:30 (IRDT)

Salehabad (Persian: صالح اباد, also Romanized as Şāleḩābād; also known as Sālābād) is a village in Chahdegal Rural District, Negin Kavir District, Fahraj County, Kerman Province, Iran. At the 2006 census, its population was 78, in 18 families.
