= Shahrokhabad =

Shahrokhabad (Persian: شاهرخ اباد) may refer to:

- Shahrokhabad, Fahraj, Kerman Province
- Shahrokhabad, Kerman, Kerman Province
- Shahrokhabad, Zarand, Kerman Province
- Shahrokhabad, Kermanshah
- Shahrokhabad, Razavi Khorasan
