= Mahi Dasht =

Mahi Dasht ماهي دشت
- Village
- Location within Iran
- Coordinates: 28°56′31″N 58°50′43″E
- Country: Iran
- Province: Kerman
- County: Fahraj
- Bakhsh: Central
- Rural District: Fahraj

Population (2006)
  - Total: 257
- Time zone: UTC+3:30 (IRST)
  - Summer (DST): UTC+4:30 (IRDT)

Mahi Dasht (Persian: ماهي دشت, also Romanized as Māhī Dasht) is a village in Fahraj Rural District, in the Central District of Fahraj County, Kerman Province, Iran. At the 2006 census, its population was 257, in 59 families.
