= Ashak Rezvan =

Ashak Rezvan اشك رضوان
- Village
- Country: Iran
- Province: Kerman
- County: Fahraj
- Bakhsh: Central
- Rural District: Borj-e Akram

Population (2006)
  - Total: 131
- Time zone: UTC+3:30 (IRST)
  - Summer (DST): UTC+4:30 (IRDT)

Ashak Rezvan (Persian: اشك رضوان, also Romanized as Āshak Rez̤vān) is a village in Borj-e Akram Rural District, in the Central District of Fahraj County, Kerman Province, Iran. At the 2006 census, its population was 131, in 28 families.
