= Deh Shahik =

Deh Shahik ده شهيك
- Village
- Location within Iran
- Coordinates: 28°48′00″N 59°11′00″E
- Country: Iran
- Province: Kerman
- County: Fahraj
- Bakhsh: Negin Kavir
- Rural District: Chahdegal

Population (2006)
  - Total: 49
- Time zone: UTC+3:30 (IRST)
  - Summer (DST): UTC+4:30 (IRDT)

Deh Shahik (Persian: ده شهيك, also Romanized as Deh Shahīk; also known as Deh Shahak) is a village in Chahdegal Rural District, Negin Kavir District, Fahraj County, Kerman Province, Iran. At the 2006 census, its population was 49, in 11 families.
