= Borj-e Moaz =

Village in Kerman province, Iran

Borj-e Moaz Persian: برج معاذ
- Village
- Location within Iran
- Coordinates: 28°52′17″N 58°53′12″E
- Country: Iran
- Province: Kerman
- County: Fahraj
- District: Central
- Rural District: Fahraj

Population (2016)
  - Total: 3,095
- Time zone: UTC+3:30 (IRST)

Borj-e Moaz (Persian: برج معاذ) (Note: Also romanized as Borj Moāz, Borj-e Ma‘āz, and Borj-e Mo‘āz̄; also known as Borj-e Sardār) is a village in Fahraj Rural District of the Central District of Fahraj County, Kerman province, Iran.

== Demographics ==
=== Population ===
At the time of the 2006 National Census, the village's population was 1,302 in 321 households, when it was in the former Fahraj District of Bam County. The following census in 2011 counted 2,115 people in 581 households, by which time the district had been separated from the county in the establishment of Fahraj County. The rural district was transferred to the new Central District. The 2016 census measured the population of the village as 3,095 people in 760 households. It was the most populous village in its rural district.
