= Shahababad, Kerman =

Shahababad شهاب اباد
- Village
- Location within Iran
- Coordinates: 28°44′51″N 59°01′49″E
- Country: Iran
- Province: Kerman
- County: Fahraj
- Bakhsh: Negin Kavir
- Rural District: Chahdegal

Population (2006)
  - Total: 363
- Time zone: UTC+3:30 (IRST)
  - Summer (DST): UTC+4:30 (IRDT)

Shahababad (Persian: شهاب اباد, also Romanized as Shahābābād; also known as Shāhābād and Shahbābād) is a village in Chahdegal Rural District, Negin Kavir District, Fahraj County, Kerman Province, Iran. At the 2006 census, its population was 363, in 80 families.
