= Deh Shahdust, Kerman =

Deh Shahdust ده شهدوست
- Village
- Location within Iran
- Coordinates: 28°45′00″N 59°15′36″E
- Country: Iran
- Province: Kerman
- County: Fahraj
- Bakhsh: Negin Kavir
- Rural District: Chahdegal

Population (2006)
  - Total: 193
- Time zone: UTC+3:30 (IRST)
  - Summer (DST): UTC+4:30 (IRDT)

Deh Shahdust (Persian: ده شهدوست, also Romanized as Deh Shahdūst) is a village in Chahdegal Rural District, Negin Kavir District, Fahraj County, Kerman Province, Iran. At the 2006 census, its population was 193, in 44 families.
