= Rustai Emam Ali =

Rustai Emam Ali روستاي امام علي
- Village
- Country: Iran
- Province: Kerman
- County: Fahraj
- Bakhsh: Negin Kavir
- Rural District: Chahdegal

Population (2006)
  - Total: 112
- Time zone: UTC+3:30 (IRST)
  - Summer (DST): UTC+4:30 (IRDT)

Rustai Emam Ali (Persian: روستاي امام علي, also Romanized as Rūstāī Emām ʿAlī) is a village in Chahdegal Rural District, Negin Kavir District, Fahraj County, Kerman Province, Iran. At the 2006 census, its population was 112, in 24 families.
