= Qadamgah-e Morteza Ali =

Qadamgah-e Morteza Ali قدمگاه مرتضي علي
- Village
- Location within Iran
- Coordinates: 28°52′27″N 58°52′12″E
- Country: Iran
- Province: Kerman
- County: Fahraj
- Bakhsh: Central
- Rural District: Borj-e Akram

Population (2006)
  - Total: 314
- Time zone: UTC+3:30 (IRST)
  - Summer (DST): UTC+4:30 (IRDT)

Qadamgah-e Morteza Ali (Persian: قدمگاه مرتضي علي, also Romanized as Qadamgāh-e Morteza’ ‘Alī and Qadamgāh-e Morteẕá ‘Alī; also known as Qadamqāh-e Morteza’ ‘Alī) is a village in Borj-e Akram Rural District, in the Central District of Fahraj County, Kerman Province, Iran. At the 2006 census, its population was 314, in 62 families.
