= Naimabad =

Naimabad (Persian: نعيماباد) may refer to:

- Naimabad, Fars
- Naimabad, Fahraj, Kerman Province
- Naimabad, Zarand, Kerman Province
- Naimabad, Mazandaran
- Naimabad, Nishapur, Razavi Khorasan Province
- Naimabad, Miyan Jolgeh, Nishapur County, Razavi Khorasan Province
- Naimabad, Semnan
