= Saniabad =

Saniabad (Persian: ثاني اباد) may refer to:

- Saniabad, Kerman
- Saniabad, Yazd
