= Shahrokhabad, Fahraj =

Shahrokhabad شاهرخ اباد
- Village
- Location within Iran
- Coordinates: 28°57′48″N 58°40′48″E
- Country: Iran
- Province: Kerman
- County: Fahraj
- Bakhsh: Central
- Rural District: Fahraj

Population (2006)
  - Total: 27
- Time zone: UTC+3:30 (IRST)
  - Summer (DST): UTC+4:30 (IRDT)

Shahrokhabad (Persian: شاهرخ اباد, also Romanized as Shāhrokhābād; also known as Shāhrokhābād-e Bozorg) is a village in Fahraj Rural District, in the Central District of Fahraj County, Kerman Province, Iran. At the 2006 census, its population was 27, in 7 families.
