= Ebrahimabad-e Yek =

Ebrahimabad-e Yek ابراهيم آباد1
- Village
- Location within Iran
- Coordinates: 28°52′06″N 59°18′00″E
- Country: Iran
- Province: Kerman
- County: Fahraj
- Bakhsh: Negin Kavir
- Rural District: Chahdegal

Population (2006)
  - Total: 23
- Time zone: UTC+3:30 (IRST)
  - Summer (DST): UTC+4:30 (IRDT)

Ebrahimabad-e Yek (Persian: ابراهيم آباد1, also Romanized as Ebrāhīmābād-e Yek; also known as Ebrāhīmābād) is a village in Chahdegal Rural District, Negin Kavir District, Fahraj County, Kerman Province, Iran. At the 2006 census, its population was 23, in 7 families.
