= Aliabad-e Chahdegan =

Village in Kerman province, Iran

Aliabad-e Chahdegan Persian: علی‌آباد چاهدگان
- Village
- Location within Iran
- Coordinates: 28°49′55″N 59°15′24″E
- Country: Iran
- Province: Kerman
- County: Fahraj
- District: Negin Kavir
- Rural District: Chahdegal

Population (2016)
  - Total: 450
- Time zone: UTC+3:30 (IRST)

Aliabad-e Chahdegan (Persian: علی‌آباد چاهدگان) (Note: Also romanized as ‘Alīābād-e Chāhdegān; also known as ‘Alīābād and ‘Alīābād-e Chāhdegāl (علی‌آباد چاهدگال)) is a village in Chahdegal Rural District of Negin Kavir District, Fahraj County, Kerman province, Iran.

== Demographics ==
=== Population ===
At the time of the 2006 National Census, the village's population was 775 in 171 households, when it was in the former Rigan District of Bam County. The following census in 2011 counted 670 people in 151 households, by which time the rural district had been separated from the county in the establishment of Fahraj County. The rural district was transferred to the new Negin Kavir District. The 2016 census measured the population of the village as 450 people in 116 households. It was the most populous village in its rural district.
