= Emamiyeh-ye Yek =

Emamiyeh-ye Yek اماميه ۱
- Village
- Location within Iran
- Coordinates: 28°55′33″N 58°47′56″E
- Country: Iran
- Province: Kerman
- County: Fahraj
- Bakhsh: Central
- Rural District: Fahraj

Population (2006)
  - Total: 102
- Time zone: UTC+3:30 (IRST)
  - Summer (DST): UTC+4:30 (IRDT)

Emamiyeh-ye Yek (Persian: امامیه ۱, also Romanized as Emāmīyeh-ye Yek; also known as Emāmīyeh-ye Avval) is a village in Fahraj Rural District, in the Central District of Fahraj County, Kerman Province, Iran. At the 2006 census, its population was 102, in 30 families.
