= Jahanabad-e Olya =

Jahanabad-e Olya (Persian: جهان ابادعليا) may refer to:

- Jahanabad-e Olya, Golestan
- Jahanabad-e Olya, Sistan and Baluchestan

== See also ==
- Jahanabad-e Bala (disambiguation)
