= Abbasiyeh =

Abbasiyeh (Persian: عباسيه) may refer to:

- Abbasiyeh, Hamadan
- Abbasiyeh, Kerman
- Abbasiyeh, Khuzestan
- Abbasiyeh, Yazd
