= Jahanabad-e Deh Nazer =

Jahanabad-e Deh Nazer جهان ابادده نظر
- Village
- Location within Iran
- Coordinates: 28°39′58″N 59°00′17″E
- Country: Iran
- Province: Kerman
- County: Fahraj
- Bakhsh: Negin Kavir
- Rural District: Chahdegal

Population (2006)
  - Total: 64
- Time zone: UTC+3:30 (IRST)
  - Summer (DST): UTC+4:30 (IRDT)

Jahanabad-e Deh Nazer (Persian: جهان ابادده نظر, also Romanized as Jahānābād-e Deh Naẓer; also known as Jahānābād) is a village in Chahdegal Rural District, Negin Kavir District, Fahraj County, Kerman Province, Iran. At the 2006 census, its population was 64, in 14 families.
