= Naimabad, Fahraj =

Naimabad نعيماباد
- Village
- Location within Iran
- Coordinates: 28°55′15″N 58°49′16″E
- Country: Iran
- Province: Kerman
- County: Fahraj
- Bakhsh: Central
- Rural District: Fahraj

Population (2006)
  - Total: 721
- Time zone: UTC+3:30 (IRST)
  - Summer (DST): UTC+4:30 (IRDT)

Naimabad (Persian: نعيماباد, also Romanized as Na‘īmābād) is a village in Fahraj Rural District, in the Central District of Fahraj County, Kerman Province, Iran. At the 2006 census, its population was 721, in 147 families.
