= Piruzabad, Kerman =

Piruzabad پيروزاباد
- Village
- Location within Iran
- Coordinates: 28°47′18″N 59°05′41″E
- Country: Iran
- Province: Kerman
- County: Fahraj
- Bakhsh: Negin Kavir
- Rural District: Chahdegal

Population (2006)
  - Total: 374
- Time zone: UTC+3:30 (IRST)
  - Summer (DST): UTC+4:30 (IRDT)

Piruzabad (Persian: پيروزاباد, also Romanized as Pīrūzābād) is a village in Chahdegal Rural District, Negin Kavir District, Fahraj County, Kerman Province, Iran. At the 2006 census, its population was 374, in 81 families.
