= Yusefabad-e Pain =

Yusefabad-e Pain يوسفابادپايين
- Village
- Location within Iran
- Coordinates: 28°47′46″N 58°51′20″E
- Country: Iran
- Province: Kerman
- County: Fahraj
- Bakhsh: Central
- Rural District: Borj-e Akram

Population (2006)
  - Total: 599
- Time zone: UTC+3:30 (IRST)
  - Summer (DST): UTC+4:30 (IRDT)

Yusefabad-e Pain (Persian: يوسفابادپايين, also Romanized as Yūsefābād-e Pā’īn; also known as Yoosef Abad, Yūsefābād, Yūsefābād-e Zīrafzār, and Yūsofābād) is a village in Borj-e Akram Rural District, in the Central District of Fahraj County, Kerman Province, Iran. At the 2006 census, its population was 599, in 138 families.
