= Saniabad, Kerman =

Saniabad ثاني اباد
- Village
- Location within Iran
- Coordinates: 28°54′28″N 58°53′20″E
- Country: Iran
- Province: Kerman
- County: Fahraj
- Bakhsh: Central
- Rural District: Fahraj

Population (2006)
  - Total: 89
- Time zone: UTC+3:30 (IRST)
  - Summer (DST): UTC+4:30 (IRDT)

Saniabad (Persian: ثاني اباد, also Romanized as S̄ānīābād) is a village in Fahraj Rural District, in the Central District of Fahraj County, Kerman Province, Iran. At the 2006 census, its population was 89, in 20 families.
