= Esmatabad, Kerman =

Esmatabad عصمتاباد
- Village
- Location within Iran
- Coordinates: 28°55′12″N 58°55′48″E
- Country: Iran
- Province: Kerman
- County: Fahraj
- Bakhsh: Central
- Rural District: Fahraj

Population (2006)
  - Total: 74
- Time zone: UTC+3:30 (IRST)
  - Summer (DST): UTC+4:30 (IRDT)

Esmatabad (Persian: عصمتاباد, also Romanized as ʿEṣmatābād) is a village in Fahraj Rural District, in the Central District of Fahraj County, Kerman Province, Iran. At the 2006 census, its population was 74, in 21 families.
