= Shurabad-e Mehrab Khan =

Shurabad-e Mehrab Khan شورآباد مهراب خان
- Village
- Location within Iran
- Coordinates: 28°59′40″N 58°50′08″E
- Country: Iran
- Province: Kerman
- County: Fahraj
- Bakhsh: Central
- Rural District: Fahraj

Population (2006)
  - Total: 54
- Time zone: UTC+3:30 (IRST)
  - Summer (DST): UTC+4:30 (IRDT)

Shurabad-e Mehrab Khan (Persian: شورآباد مهراب خان, also Romanized as Shūrābād-e Mehrāb Khān; also known as Shūrābād) is a village in Fahraj Rural District, in the Central District of Fahraj County, Kerman Province, Iran. At the 2006 census, its population was 54, in 9 families.
