= Ebrahimabad-e Do =

Ebrahimabad-e Do ابراهيم آباد2
- Village
- Location within Iran
- Coordinates: 28°44′27″N 59°09′05″E
- Country: Iran
- Province: Kerman
- County: Fahraj
- Bakhsh: Negin Kavir
- Rural District: Chahdegal

Population (2006)
  - Total: 52
- Time zone: UTC+3:30 (IRST)
  - Summer (DST): UTC+4:30 (IRDT)

Ebrahimabad-e Do (Persian: ابراهيم آباد2, also Romanized as Ebrāhīmābād-e Do; also known as Ebrāhīmābād) is a village in Chahdegal Rural District, Negin Kavir District, Fahraj County, Kerman Province, Iran. At the 2006 census, its population was 52, in 16 families.
