= Yusefabad-e Salar =

Yusefabad-e Salar يوسفابادسالار
- Village
- Location within Iran
- Coordinates: 28°50′59″N 58°51′09″E
- Country: Iran
- Province: Kerman
- County: Fahraj
- Bakhsh: Central
- Rural District: Borj-e Akram

Population (2006)
  - Total: 78
- Time zone: UTC+3:30 (IRST)
  - Summer (DST): UTC+4:30 (IRDT)

Yusefabad-e Salar (Persian: يوسفابادسالار, also Romanized as Yūsefābād-e Sālār; also known as Yūsefābād and Yūsefābād-e Bālā) is a village in Borj-e Akram Rural District, in the Central District of Fahraj County, Kerman Province, Iran. At the 2006 census, its population was 78, in 20 families.
