= Negin Kavir Rural District =

Rural district in Kerman province, Iran

Negin Kavir Rural District Persian: دهستان نگین کویر
- Rural District
- Location within Iran
- Coordinates: 28°51′59″N 59°03′59″E
- Country: Iran
- Province: Kerman
- County: Fahraj
- District: Negin Kavir
- Capital: Dehnow-e Eslamabad

Population (2016)
  - Total: 24,092
- Time zone: UTC+3:30 (IRST)

Negin Kavir Rural District (Persian: دهستان نگین کویر) is in Negin Kavir District of Fahraj County, Kerman province, Iran. It is administered from the city of Dehnow-e Eslamabad.

== History ==
In 2009, Fahraj District and Chahdegal Rural District were separated from Bam County in the establishment of Fahraj County, and Negin Kavir Rural District was created in the new Negin Kavir District.

== Demographics ==
=== Population ===
At the time of the 2011 National Census, the rural district's population was 22,833 in 5,488 households. The 2016 census measured the population of the rural district as 24,092 in 5,836 households. The most populous of its 54 villages was Esmailabad, with 4,769 people.
