= Ali Koli =

Ali Koli علي كلي
- Village
- Location within Iran
- Coordinates: 28°53′16″N 58°47′25″E
- Country: Iran
- Province: Kerman
- County: Fahraj
- Bakhsh: Central
- Rural District: Borj-e Akram

Population (2006)
  - Total: 87
- Time zone: UTC+3:30 (IRST)
  - Summer (DST): UTC+4:30 (IRDT)

Ali Koli (Persian: علي كلي, also Romanized as ‘Alī Kolī; also known as Emāmīyeh) is a village in Borj-e Akram Rural District, in the Central District of Fahraj County, Kerman Province, Iran. At the 2006 census, its population was 87, in 19 families.
