= Hajjiabad-e Do, Kerman =

Hajjiabad-e Do حاجي آباد2
- Village
- Location within Iran
- Coordinates: 28°45′22″N 58°58′59″E
- Country: Iran
- Province: Kerman
- County: Fahraj
- Bakhsh: Negin Kavir
- Rural District: Chahdegal

Population (2006)
  - Total: 25
- Time zone: UTC+3:30 (IRST)
  - Summer (DST): UTC+4:30 (IRDT)

Hajjiabad-e Do (Persian: حاجي آباد2, also Romanized as Ḩājjīābād-e Do; also known as Ḩajīābād and Ḩājjīābād) is a village in Chahdegal Rural District, Negin Kavir District, Fahraj County, Kerman Province, Iran. At the 2006 census, its population was 25, in 6 families.
