= Jahanabad-e Sofla =

Jahanabad-e Sofla (Persian: جهان ابادسفلي) may refer to:

- Jahanabad-e Sofla, Golestan
- Jahanabad-e Sofla, Kohgiluyeh and Boyer-Ahmad
- Jahanabad-e Sofla, Sistan and Baluchestan

== See also ==
- Jahanabad-e Pain
