= Hasanabad-e Chahdegan =

Village in Kerman province, Iran

Hasanabad-e Chahdegan Persian: حسن‌آباد چاهدگان
- Village
- Location within Iran
- Coordinates: 28°50′01″N 59°15′02″E
- Country: Iran
- Province: Kerman
- County: Fahraj
- District: Negin Kavir
- Rural District: Chahdegal

Population (2016)
  - Total: 53
- Time zone: UTC+3:30 (IRST)

Hasanabad-e Chahdegan (Persian: حسن‌آباد چاهدگان) (Note: Also romanized as Hasanabad-e Chah Degan and Ḩasanābād-e Chāh Degān; also known as Ḩasanābād, Ḩasanābād-e Chāh Degāl (حسن‌آباد چاهدگال), and Ḩasanābād-e Chāheh Gol) is a village in, and the capital of, Chahdegal Rural District of Negin Kavir District, Fahraj County, Kerman province, Iran.

== Demographics ==
=== Population ===
At the time of the 2006 National Census, the village's population was 372 in 76 households, when it was in the former Rigan District of Bam County. The following census in 2011 counted 131 people in 29 households, by which time the rural district had been separated from the county in the establishment of Fahraj County. The rural district was transferred to the new Negin Kavir District. The 2016 census measured the population of the village as 53 people in 16 households.
