= Ebrahimabad-e Deh Gavi =

Ebrahimabad-e Deh Gavi ابراهيم اباددهگاوي
- Village
- Location within Iran
- Coordinates: 28°47′26″N 59°07′52″E
- Country: Iran
- Province: Kerman
- County: Fahraj
- Bakhsh: Negin Kavir
- Rural District: Chahdegal

Population (2006)
  - Total: 151
- Time zone: UTC+3:30 (IRST)
  - Summer (DST): UTC+4:30 (IRDT)

Ebrahimabad-e Deh Gavi (Persian: ابراهيم اباددهگاوي, also Romanized as Ebrāhīmābād-e Deh Gāvī; also known as Ebrāhīmābād) is a village in Chahdegal Rural District, Negin Kavir District, Fahraj County, Kerman Province, Iran. At the 2006 census, its population was 151, in 39 families.
