= Jahanabad Assembly constituency =

Jahanabad Assembly constituency or Jehanabad Assembly constituency could refer to these electoral constituencies in India:

- Jahanabad, Uttar Pradesh Assembly constituency
- Jehanabad Assembly constituency, in Bihar

== See also ==
- Jahanabad (disambiguation)
- Jahanabad Lok Sabha constituency, Bihar, in the lower house (Lok Sabha) of the Indian parliament
