= Rezvaniyeh =

Rezvaniyeh (Persian: رضوانيه) may refer to:

- Rezvaniyeh, Fahraj, Kerman Province
- Rezvaniyeh Rural District, in Isfahan Province
