= Seyyed Rezaqoli Shahidi =

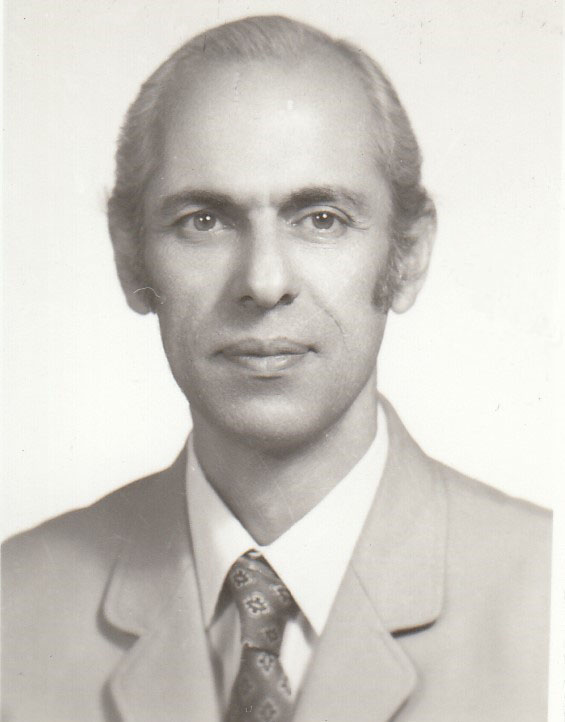
- Born: 31 December 1923; Shapur neighborhood, Tehran, Iran
- Died: 30 April 2017 (aged 93)
- Resting place: Artists' and Notables' Section, Behesht-e Zahra
- Education: Among the first students of Jabar Baghcheban in Tehran, 1933
- Occupations: Social and sports activist; founder of organizations for deaf people
- Organizations: Iranian Deaf Association; Association of Families of the Deaf of Iran
- Known for: Pioneering social and sports activities for deaf people and founding related organizations
- Board member of: Founding member of the Iranian Deaf Association from its establishment; Vice-chairman of the board of the Deaf Association (1959–1994); Chairman of the board of the Association of Families of the Deaf of Iran (1972–1979)
- Spouse: Mahin Rais-Rouhani
- Children: Shabnam, Sheida, Shahram

Seyyed Rezaqoli Shahidi (31 December 1923 – 30 April 2017) was an Iranian social activist and influential figure in the country's deaf community. He played an important role in founding institutions and developing social and sports activities for deaf people.

== Illness and deafness ==
Seyyed Rezaqoli Shahidi grew up in an educated family. His father was a judge, while his mother was a teacher who was familiar with the French language. At approximately two years of age, he lost his hearing after contracting meningitis and entered what he later described as a world of silence.

At the age of eight, he was sent to a special school for disabled students in Isfahan. However, because of the ineffectiveness of its educational methods, he returned to Tehran after several months. At the age of eleven, coinciding with the establishment of Tehran's first special school for deaf and non-speaking children under the direction of Jabar Baghcheban, he enrolled in the school, which was located in Torshti Alley near Hasanabad Square. The school provided the foundation for his academic and social development.

== Establishment of the Association of Deaf People in Tehran ==
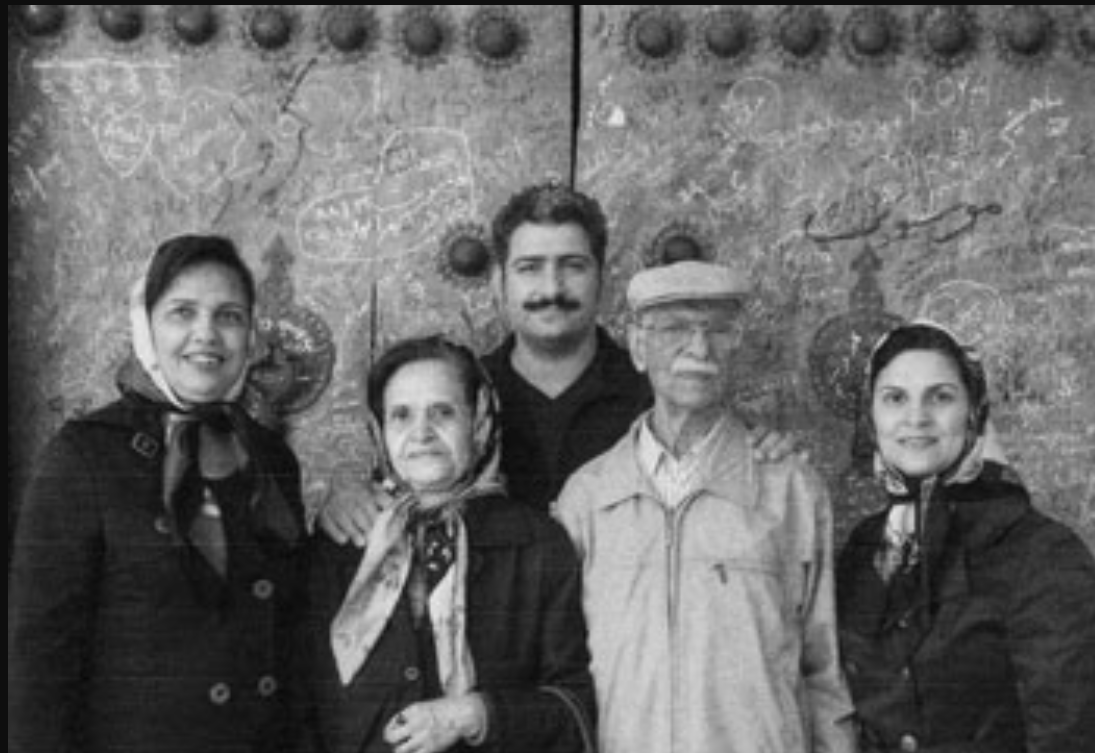
The Shahidi family

Before the establishment of the Association of Deaf People in 1948, deaf people in Tehran had no designated place to meet. They often gathered and communicated in coffeehouses or on street corners. This situation sometimes provoked negative reactions from shopkeepers and passers-by and, in some cases, led to confrontations and harassment.

Having witnessed these problems for years and maintaining a close relationship with Jabar Baghcheban, Shahidi consulted him about establishing an independent space for deaf people. Baghcheban, who was well aware of these difficulties, agreed with the proposal to establish a dedicated association. The Association of Deaf People was consequently established in 1948 with Baghcheban's support.

At the beginning of its activities, one of the classrooms at Baghcheban School on Ramsar Street was allocated to the association, and Shahidi was appointed its director. He made efforts to obtain official authorization, but these attempts were unsuccessful because government institutions had little understanding of the needs of deaf people. Despite limited financial resources and the absence of official support, the association continued to operate on a semi-active basis and provided valuable services to the deaf community.

== Deaf Sports Federation ==
Before the establishment of a formal federation, deaf athletes engaged in sports activities sporadically in traditional gyms and public sports clubs. Some deaf people, including Karim Raisnia, trained in wrestling at the Pōlād Club near Shapur Square. Raisnia trained alongside wrestlers such as Gholamreza Takhti. He and Takhti were sent to Turkey for the first time to participate in a competition, where Raisnia won first place in an international event.

This success drew the attention of officials to the athletic potential of deaf people. In 1954, the Physical Education Organization held a meeting attended by Shahidi and a group of deaf people to consider establishing an official organization for deaf athletes. Ultimately, the Deaf Sports Federation was established under the supervision of the Physical Education Organization in the summer of 1955. Lieutenant General Garzan was appointed president, and Ataollah Amirian was appointed secretary of the federation. Shahidi was placed in charge of the federation's technical committee and served as liaison with deaf athletes.

During the federation's early years, training sessions were held at Amjadieh Stadium, now known as Shahid Shiroudi Stadium. Sports such as swimming and shooting were gradually added to the federation's activities. In 1957, Iran joined the International Committee of Sports for the Deaf, and Iranian deaf athletes participated for the first time in the eighth Deaflympics in Milan, Italy. In March 1974, the organization's name was changed to the Iran Deaf Sports Federation.

== Iranian Deaf Association ==
After the establishment of the Deaf Sports Federation, Shahidi revived the Association of Deaf People, which had been inactive for several years. The process of obtaining official authorization for the association began in 1959 and was completed in 1960 after the drafting of bylaws and the holding of numerous meetings. The association's first board election was held on 14 February 1960 at the Amirkabir Club.

The elected board consisted of Ali Sرتیپی as chairman; Shahidi as vice-chairman; Seyyed Hossein Mirjalali as treasurer; Morteza Zolfaghari as administrative officer; and Mohammad Morsaei, Mirza Aqa Homayounfar, and Seyyed Hassan Miri as members. Karim Raisnia and Abolhassan served as auditors.

The association officially began its activities on 4 March 1961. Its first premises were located at Saadi Elementary School on Amirkabir Street. In subsequent years, its activities expanded to other cities. In 2015, the organization's name was changed to the Iranian Deaf Association, under which it was formally registered.

== Association of Families of the Deaf of Iran ==
Before the establishment of the Association of Families of the Deaf of Iran, families of deaf people had limited access to suitable cultural, social, and recreational facilities. The lack of appropriate opportunities for the social participation of deaf women, who faced additional restrictions, also highlighted the need for a supportive organization.

The Association of Families of the Deaf of Iran was established in 1972 with the support of Samin Baghcheban. Its first general assembly was held on 29 April 1972, with the participation of a group of families of deaf people, and its bylaws were reviewed. The association was established as a charitable, nongovernmental, nonpolitical, and nonprofit organization.

In the initial composition of the board, Shahidi was appointed chairman, Hassan Taghavi auditor, and Nasrin Zali treasurer.

== National Organization for the Welfare of Deaf People of Iran ==
The National Organization for the Welfare of Deaf People of Iran was established in September 1971 under the Ministry of Labour and Social Affairs. It played an important role in improving the conditions of deaf people. The organization provided services including employment, rehabilitation, speech therapy, vocational training, and social welfare, and expanded its activities to cities throughout Iran.

At the suggestion of Samineh Baghcheban, Shahidi joined the organization as an interpreter and liaison for deaf people. He worked at its rehabilitation center on Hafez Street. In translating for and accompanying deaf people during administrative and judicial procedures, he encountered challenges including a lack of legal literacy, differences in sign language, and serious misunderstandings. The organization continued its activities until the early period of the Iranian Revolution, after which it was dissolved.

== Iranian Sign Language Research and Development Committee ==
On 6 July 1973, a Sign Language Committee was established as a subdivision of the National Organization for the Welfare of Deaf People of Iran, with the aim of developing Persian sign language. The committee began its work with Julia Anne Oliver Samii, Shahidi, Mohsen Louh-Mousavi, Kamran Rahimi, and Maryam Rostami. In later years, others, including Morteza Piroozi, Reza Mahmoudi, and Habib Tehrani-Zadeh, joined the committee.

At the beginning of its activities, Julia Samii proposed using American Sign Language, but Shahidi and Louh-Mousavi opposed the proposal. Instead, a project to compile a dictionary of Iranian Sign Language was launched with the participation of deaf people. As part of the project, commonly used signs were collected and examined, and the signs were selected by majority vote. A sign-language dictionary containing illustrations and descriptions of the movements was then compiled.

Julia Samii died in an airplane accident on 5 August 1978, but the committee continued its work, and the first volume of the Persian Sign Language Dictionary was published in 1980.

After the Iranian Revolution, the committee continued its activities under the name Research and Development Committee for Sign Language, under the supervision of the State Welfare Organization of Iran. From 1992, it was based at the University of Social Welfare and Rehabilitation Sciences. In 2009, the committee became inactive because it did not recruit deaf staff and was transferred to the Iranian Deaf Association.

== Cultural and sports services and occupations ==
Timeline of Shahidi's activities
Year	Event
1947	Joined the Ministry of Economy in the Industries and Mines Department
1948	Collaborated with Jabar Baghcheban in establishing the Association of Deaf People
1955	Began collaborating with the Iran Deaf Sports Federation
1956	Became chairman of the technical committee of the Deaf Sports Federation
1959	Helped establish the Iranian Deaf Association
1960	Became vice-chairman of the board of the Iranian Deaf Association
1960	Joined the Society for the Protection of Deaf Children
1961	Participated in the International Games for the Deaf in Helsinki, Finland
1962	Participated in the Winter Games for the Deaf in Sweden
1962	Became head of the general affairs department of the Deaf Sports Federation
1963	Participated in the World Congress of the World Federation of the Deaf in Sweden
1965	Served as administrator and liaison at Baghcheban School in Yusefabad
1967	Participated in the World Congress of the World Federation of the Deaf in Poland
1971	Served as liaison for deaf people at the police department's driving-license office
1971	Participated in the World Congress of the World Federation of the Deaf in France
1972	Joined the National Organization for the Welfare of Deaf People of Iran
1972	Helped establish the Association of Families of the Deaf of Iran
1972	Participated in the International Conference of the Deaf in Israel/Palestine
1973	Joined the Iranian Sign Language Committee
1975	Participated in the World Congress of the Deaf in the United States
1977	Presented a paper at the World Symposium of Deaf Interpreters in Denmark
1977	Participated in a regional conference on deaf people in Tehran
1980	Published the first volume of the Persian Sign Language Dictionary

== Cultural and artistic activities ==
Shahidi's cultural and literary activities
Year	Work	Type of collaboration	Description
2001	The Life and Thought of Baghcheban	Co-editor	A book about the ideas and life of Jabar Baghcheban
2008 and 2011	A History of Iran's Deaf Community	Collaborator in preparing a booklet	Documentation of the condition and history of deaf people in Iran
2010	Illuminating the Darkness	Co-author	A literary work focusing on services for deaf people
