= Dehnow-e Eslamabad =

City in Kerman province, Iran

Dehnow-e Eslamabad Persian: دهنواسلام اباد
- City
- Location within Iran
- Coordinates: 28°47′16″N 59°04′44″E
- Country: Iran
- Province: Kerman
- County: Fahraj
- District: Negin Kavir

Population (2016)
  - Total: 3,367
- Time zone: UTC+3:30 (IRST)

Dehnow-e Eslamabad (Persian: دهنواسلام اباد) (Note: Also romanized as Dehnow-e Eslāmābād) is a city in, and the capital of, Negin Kavir District of Fahraj County, Kerman province, Iran. It also serves as the administrative center for Negin Kavir Rural District.

== Demographics ==
=== Population ===
At the time of the 2006 National Census, Dehnow-e Eslamabad's population was 534 in 141 households, when it was a village in Chahdegal Rural District of the former Rigan District of Bam County). The following census in 2011 counted 3,516 people in 825 households, by which time the rural district had been separated from the county in the establishment of Fahraj County. The rural district was transferred to the new Negin Kavir District, and the village was transferred to Negin Kavir Rural District created in the district. The 2016 census measured the population of the village as 3,367 people in 888 households.

After the census, Dehnow-e Eslamabad was elevated to the status of a city.
