= Jahanabad-e Bala, Kerman =

Jahanabad-e Bala جهان ابادبالا
- Village
- Location within Iran
- Coordinates: 28°53′09″N 58°53′34″E
- Country: Iran
- Province: Kerman
- County: Fahraj
- Bakhsh: Central
- Rural District: Fahraj

Population (2006)
  - Total: 866
- Time zone: UTC+3:30 (IRST)
  - Summer (DST): UTC+4:30 (IRDT)

Jahanabad-e Bala (Persian: جهان ابادبالا, also Romanized as Jahānābād-e Bālā; also known as Jahānābād and Jehānābād) is a village in Fahraj Rural District, in the Central District of Fahraj County, Kerman Province, Iran. At the 2006 census, its population was 866, in 181 families.
