= Hajjiabad-e Do =

Hajjiabad-e Do (Persian: حاجي اباددو) may refer to:

- Hajjiabad-e Do, Kerman
- Hajjiabad-e Do, Kermanshah
