= Fahrej =

Fahrej may refer to:

- Fahraj, a city in Kerman Province, Iran
- Iranshahr (city), a city in Sistan and Baluchestan Province, Iran
