= Ebrahimabad-e Jadid =

Ebrahimabad-e Jadid (Persian: ابراهيم ابادجديد) may refer to:

- Ebrahimabad-e Jadid, Ardabil
- Ebrahimabad-e Jadid, Kerman
