= Siah Khan (disambiguation) =

Siah Khan was an 8 ft 6 in (259 cm) tall Persian man.

Siah Khan (Persian: سياه خان) may also refer to:

- Siah Khan (30°57′ N 61°35′ E), Hirmand
- Siah Khan (31°08′ N 61°47′ E), Hirmand
