= Jahanabad-e Pain =

Jahanabad-e Pain جهان ابادپائين
- Village
- Location within Iran
- Coordinates: 28°52′51″N 58°53′04″E
- Country: Iran
- Province: Kerman
- County: Fahraj
- Bakhsh: Central
- Rural District: Fahraj

Population (2006)
  - Total: 705
- Time zone: UTC+3:30 (IRST)
  - Summer (DST): UTC+4:30 (IRDT)

Jahanabad-e Pain (Persian: جهان ابادپائين, also Romanized as Jahānābād-e Pā’īn; also known as Jahānābād) is a village in Fahraj Rural District, in the Central District of Fahraj County, Kerman Province, Iran. At the 2006 census, its population was 705, in 148 families.
