= Ebrahimabad-e Jadid, Kerman =

Ebrahimabad-e Jadid ابراهيم ابادجديد
- Village
- Location within Iran
- Coordinates: 28°40′02″N 59°02′04″E
- Country: Iran
- Province: Kerman
- County: Fahraj
- Bakhsh: Negin Kavir
- Rural District: Chahdegal

Population (2006)
  - Total: 458
- Time zone: UTC+3:30 (IRST)
  - Summer (DST): UTC+4:30 (IRDT)

Ebrahimabad-e Jadid (Persian: ابراهيم ابادجديد, also Romanized as Ebrāhīmābād-e Jadīd; also known as Ebrāhīmābād) is a village in Chahdegal Rural District, Negin Kavir District, Fahraj County, Kerman Province, Iran. At the 2006 census, its population was 458, in 125 families.
