= Piruz =

Piruz may refer to:

== Historical figures ==
- Peroz I or Piruz I, Sasanian king of Iran
- Peroz II or Piruz II, Sasanian king of Iran
- Peroz III, son of King Yazdegerd III the last king of Persia
- Piruz Khosrow (died 642), Persian aristocrat who murdered Queen Boran

== Other uses ==
- Piruz, Iran, a village
- Piruz Dilanchi (born 1965), Azerbaijani activist
- Hajji Firuz or Khwaje Piruz, fictional character in Iranian folklore

== See also ==
- Feroz, a name, including a list of people with the name and its variants
- Parviz, a name, including a list of people with the name
- Piruzeh, a village in Kermanshah Province
- Piruzabad, Kerman
- Piruzabad, Khuzestan
- Piruzabad, Golestan
