= Ebrahimabad, Saveh =

Village in Markazi, Iran

Ebrahimabad ابراهيم اباد
- Village
- Location within Iran
- Coordinates: 35°07′16″N 49°37′24″E
- Country: Iran
- Province: Markazi
- County: Saveh
- Bakhsh: Nowbaran
- Rural District: Bayat

Population (2006)
  - Total: 37
- Time zone: UTC+3:30 (IRST)
  - Summer (DST): UTC+4:30 (IRDT)

Ebrahimabad (Persian: ابراهيم اباد, also Romanized as Ebrāhīmābād) is a village in Bayat Rural District, Nowbaran District, Saveh County, Markazi Province, Iran. At the 2006 census, its population was 37, in 11 families.
