= Shahrokhabad, Kerman =

Shahrokhabad کوفه
- Village
- Location within Iran
- Coordinates: 30°22′00″N 56°54′54″E
- Country: Iran
- Province: Kerman
- County: Kerman
- Bakhsh: Central
- Rural District: Zangiabad

Population (2006)
  - Total: 1,549
- Time zone: UTC+3:30 (IRST)
  - Summer (DST): UTC+4:30 (IRDT)

Shahrokhabad (Persian: شاهرخ اباد, also romanized as Shāhrokhābād) is a village in Zangiabad Rural District, in the Central District of Kerman County, Kerman Province, Iran. At the 2006 census, its population was 1,549, in 400 families.
