= Yusefabad, Kuhdasht =

Yusefabad يوسف آباد
- Village
- Location within Iran
- Coordinates: 33°27′00″N 47°20′00″E
- Country: Iran
- Province: Lorestan
- County: Kuhdasht
- Bakhsh: Kunani
- Rural District: Kunani

Population (2006)
  - Total: 98
- Time zone: UTC+3:30 (IRST)
  - Summer (DST): UTC+4:30 (IRDT)

Yusefabad (Persian: يوسف آباد, also Romanized as Yūsefābād; also known as Yūsef) is a village in Kunani Rural District, Kunani District, Kuhdasht County, Lorestan Province, Iran. At the 2006 census, its population was 98, in 17 families.
