= Ebrahimabad, Bijar =

Ebrahimabad ابراهيم آباد
- Village
- Location within Iran
- Coordinates: 35°46′05″N 47°19′19″E
- Country: Iran
- Province: Kurdistan
- County: Bijar
- Bakhsh: Central
- Rural District: Najafabad

Population (2006)
  - Total: 39
- Time zone: UTC+3:30 (IRST)
  - Summer (DST): UTC+4:30 (IRDT)

Ebrahimabad (Persian: ابراهيم آباد, also Romanized as Ebrāhīmābād and Ibrāhīmābād) is a village in Najafabad Rural District, in the Central District of Bijar County, Kurdistan Province, Iran. At the 2006 census, its population was 39, in 10 families. The village is populated by Kurds.
