= Ebrahimabad-e Dasht Bar =

Ebrahimabad-e Dasht Bar ابراهيم اباددشت بر
- Village
- Location within Iran
- Coordinates: 28°27′39″N 56°07′08″E
- Country: Iran
- Province: Kerman
- County: Arzuiyeh
- Bakhsh: Central
- Rural District: Vakilabad

Population (2006)
  - Total: 47
- Time zone: UTC+3:30 (IRST)
  - Summer (DST): UTC+4:30 (IRDT)

Ebrahimabad-e Dasht Bar (Persian: ابراهيم اباددشت بر, also Romanized as Ebrāhīmābād-e Dasht Bar; also known as Ebrāhīmābād, Ebrahim Abad Arzoo’eyeh, and Ebrāhīmābād-e Arzū’īyeh) is a village in Vakilabad Rural District, in the Central District of Arzuiyeh County, Kerman Province, Iran. In 2006, according to census, its population totaled 47 individuals. The census also revealed a total of 14 families.
