= Yusefabad, Kazerun =

Village in Fars, Iran

Yanderanlu یاندرانلو
- Village
- Location within Iran
- Coordinates: 29°24′17″N 51°47′20″E
- Country: Iran
- Province: Fars
- County: Kazerun
- Bakhsh: Jereh and Baladeh
- Rural District: Dadin

Population (2006)
  - Total: 101
- Time zone: UTC+3:30 (IRST)
  - Summer (DST): UTC+4:30 (IRDT)

Yanderanlu (Persian: یاندرانلو, also Romanized as Yanderanlu) is a village in Dadin Rural District, Jereh and Baladeh District, Kazerun County, Fars province, Iran. At the 2006 census, its population was 101, in 18 families.
