= Jahanabad, Kharameh =

Jahanabad جهان اباد
- Village
- Location within Iran
- Coordinates: 29°27′08″N 53°25′45″E
- Country: Iran
- Province: Fars
- County: Kharameh
- Bakhsh: Central
- Rural District: Korbal

Population (2006)
  - Total: 478
- Time zone: UTC+3:30 (IRST)
  - Summer (DST): UTC+4:30 (IRDT)

Jahanabad (Persian: جهان اباد, also Romanized as Jahānābād; also known as Dīvdān, Jahānābād-e Dīvdān, and Moḩammadābād) is a village in Korbal Rural District, in the Central District of Kharameh County, Fars province, Iran.

== Population Census ==
At the 2006 census, its population was 478, in 112 families.
