= Shurabad, Kermanshah =

Shurabad شورآباد
- Village
- Location within Iran
- Coordinates: 34°21′36″N 46°39′46″E
- Country: Iran
- Province: Kermanshah
- County: Kermanshah
- Bakhsh: Kuzaran
- Rural District: Sanjabi

Population (2006)
  - Total: 109
- Time zone: UTC+3:30 (IRST)
  - Summer (DST): UTC+4:30 (IRDT)

Shurabad (Persian: شورآباد, also Romanized as Shūrābād; also known as Shūrābeh) is a village in Sanjabi Rural District, Kuzaran District, Kermanshah County, Kermanshah Province, Iran. At the 2006 census, its population was 109, in 23 families.
