= Jahanabad, Torbat-e Jam =

Jahanabad جهان اباد
- Village
- Location within Iran
- Coordinates: 35°24′41″N 60°34′06″E
- Country: Iran
- Province: Razavi Khorasan
- County: Torbat-e Jam
- Bakhsh: Central
- Rural District: Jamrud

Population (2006)
  - Total: 126
- Time zone: UTC+3:30 (IRST)
  - Summer (DST): UTC+4:30 (IRDT)

Jahanabad (Persian: جهان اباد, also Romanized as Jahānābād; also known as Kalāteh-ye ‘Os̄mān Solţān) is a village in Jamrud Rural District, in the Central District of Torbat-e Jam County, Razavi Khorasan Province, Iran. At the 2006 census, its population was 126, in 32 families. Three kilometers west of the village more than a dozen tombs are located. These tombs date back to the Timurid era in the early 15th century, and were built as the final resting place of three imamzadeh and several merchants. The tombs are decorated with several inscriptions.
