= Yusefabad-e Shah Mirza Kandi =

Yusefabad-e Shah Mirza Kandi یوسف‌آباد شاه میرزاکندی
- Village
- Location within Iran
- Coordinates: 37°40′27″N 45°05′15″E
- Country: Iran
- Province: West Azerbaijan
- County: Urmia
- Bakhsh: Central
- Rural District: Bash Qaleh

Population (2006)
  - Total: 58
- Time zone: UTC+3:30 (IRST)
  - Summer (DST): UTC+4:30 (IRDT)

Yusefabad-e Shah Mirza Kandi (Persian: یوسف‌آباد شاه میرزاکندی, also Romanized as Yūsefābād-e Shāh Mīrzā Kandī; also known as Shāh Mīrzākandī and Yūsefābād) is a village in Bash Qaleh Rural District, in the Central District of Urmia County, West Azerbaijan Province, Iran. At the 2006 census, its population was 58, in 17 families.
