= Emamiyeh-e Olya =

Emamiyeh-e Olya اماميه عليا
- Village
- Location within Iran
- Coordinates: 34°15′09″N 46°03′53″E
- Country: Iran
- Province: Kermanshah
- County: Sarpol-e Zahab
- Bakhsh: Central
- Rural District: Qaleh Shahin

Population (2006)
  - Total: 758
- Time zone: UTC+3:30 (IRST)
  - Summer (DST): UTC+4:30 (IRDT)

Emamiyeh-e Olya (Persian: اماميه عليا, also Romanized as Emāmīyeh-ye ‘Olyā; also known as Choghā Kadū, Emāmīyeh, Sagān-e Bālā, and Sagān-e ‘Olyā) is a village in Qaleh Shahin Rural District, in the Central District of Sarpol-e Zahab County, Kermanshah Province, Iran. At the 2006 census, its population was 758, in 147 families.
