= Naimabad, Nishapur =

Naimabad نعيم اباد
- Village
- Location within Iran
- Coordinates: 36°08′17″N 58°55′19″E
- Country: Iran
- Province: Razavi Khorasan
- County: Nishapur
- Bakhsh: Central
- Rural District: Fazl

Population (2006)
  - Total: 385
- Time zone: UTC+3:30 (IRST)
  - Summer (DST): UTC+4:30 (IRDT)

Naimabad (Persian: نعيم اباد, also Romanized as Na‘īmābād; also known as Qal‘eh Now-e Na‘īmābād) is a village in Fazl Rural District, in the Central District of Nishapur County, Razavi Khorasan Province, Iran. At the 2006 census, its population was 385, in 100 families.
