= Ebrahimabad-e Muri =

Ebrahimabad-e Muri ابراهيم ابادموري
- Village
- Location within Iran
- Coordinates: 36°04′06″N 58°58′07″E
- Country: Iran
- Province: Razavi Khorasan
- County: Nishapur
- Bakhsh: Central
- Rural District: Darbqazi

Population (2006)
  - Total: 169
- Time zone: UTC+3:30 (IRST)
  - Summer (DST): UTC+4:30 (IRDT)

Ebrahimabad-e Muri (Persian: ابراهيم ابادموري, also Romanized as Ebrāhīmābād-e Mūrī; also known as Ebrāhīmābād) is a village in Darbqazi Rural District, in the Central District of Nishapur County, Razavi Khorasan Province, Iran. At the 2006 census, its population was 169, in 44 families.
