= Jahanabad, Kermanshah =

Jahanabad جهان اباد
- Village
- Location within Iran
- Coordinates: 34°27′52″N 46°55′21″E
- Country: Iran
- Province: Kermanshah
- County: Kermanshah
- Bakhsh: Central
- Rural District: Miyan Darband

Population (2006)
  - Total: 54
- Time zone: UTC+3:30 (IRST)
  - Summer (DST): UTC+4:30 (IRDT)

Jahanabad (Persian: جهان اباد, also Romanized as Jahānābād) is a village in Miyan Darband Rural District, in the Central District of Kermanshah County, Kermanshah Province, Iran. At the 2006 census, its population was 54, in 14 families.
