= Yusefabad, Eslamiyeh =

Yusefabad يوسف آباد
- Village
- Location within Iran
- Coordinates: 30°26′08″N 55°50′39″E
- Country: Iran
- Province: Kerman
- County: Rafsanjan
- Bakhsh: Central
- Rural District: Eslamiyeh

Population (2006)
  - Total: 178
- Time zone: UTC+3:30 (IRST)
  - Summer (DST): UTC+4:30 (IRDT)

Yusefabad (Persian: يوسف آباد, also Romanized as Yūsefābād) is a village in Eslamiyeh Rural District, in the Central District of Rafsanjan County, Kerman Province, Iran. At the 2006 census, its population was 178, in 50 families.
