= Shurabad, West Azerbaijan =

Shurabad شورآباد
- Village
- Location within Iran
- Coordinates: 36°32′32″N 45°39′03″E
- Country: Iran
- Province: West Azerbaijan
- County: Mahabad
- Bakhsh: Khalifan
- Rural District: Mangur-e Sharqi

Population (2006)
  - Total: 42
- Time zone: UTC+3:30 (IRST)
  - Summer (DST): UTC+4:30 (IRDT)

Shurabad (Persian: شورآباد, also Romanized as Shūrābād; also known as Shorābād) is a village in Mangur-e Sharqi Rural District, Khalifan District, Mahabad County, West Azerbaijan Province, Iran. At the 2006 census, its population was 42, in 6 families.
