= Ebrahimabad, Sarvabad =

Ebrahimabad ابراهیم‌آباد
- Village
- Location within Iran
- Coordinates: 35°19′17″N 46°20′47″E
- Country: Iran
- Province: Kurdistan
- County: Sarvabad
- Bakhsh: Central
- Rural District: Razab

Population (2006)
  - Total: 370
- Time zone: UTC+3:30 (IRST)
  - Summer (DST): UTC+4:30 (IRDT)

Ebrahimabad (Persian: ابراهیم‌آباد, also Romanized as Ebrāhīmābād) is a village in Razab Rural District, in the Central District of Sarvabad County, Kurdistan Province, Iran. At the 2006 census, its population was 370, in 89 families. The village is populated by Kurds.
