= Saniabad, Yazd =

Saniabad ثاني اباد
- Village
- Location within Iran
- Coordinates: 31°39′23″N 54°15′36″E
- Country: Iran
- Province: Yazd
- County: Mehriz
- Bakhsh: Central
- Rural District: Miankuh

Population (2006)
  - Total: 60
- Time zone: UTC+3:30 (IRST)
  - Summer (DST): UTC+4:30 (IRDT)

Saniabad (Persian: ثاني اباد, also Romanized as S̄ānīābād and Sonnīābād; also known as Sunnīābād) is a village in Miankuh Rural District, in the Central District of Mehriz County, Yazd Province, Iran. At the 2006 census, its population was 60, in 19 families.
