= Ebrahimabad-e Olya va Sofla =

Ebrahimabad-e Olya va Sofla ابراهيم آباد عليا و سفلي
- Village
- Location within Iran
- Coordinates: 35°42′56″N 47°10′37″E
- Country: Iran
- Province: Kurdistan
- County: Divandarreh
- Bakhsh: Saral
- Rural District: Kowleh

Population (2006)
  - Total: 172
- Time zone: UTC+3:30 (IRST)
  - Summer (DST): UTC+4:30 (IRDT)

Ebrahimabad-e Olya va Sofla (Persian: ابراهيم آباد عليا و سفلي, also Romanized as Ebrāhīmābād-e ‘Olyā va Soflá; also known as Ebrāhīmābād and Ībrāhīmābād) is a village in Kowleh Rural District, Saral District, Divandarreh County, Kurdistan Province, Iran. At the 2006 census, its population was 172, in 40 families. The village is populated by Kurds.
