= Yusefabad, Madvarat =

Yusefabad يوسف اباد
- Village
- Location within Iran
- Coordinates: 30°21′12″N 55°07′55″E
- Country: Iran
- Province: Kerman
- County: Shahr-e Babak
- Bakhsh: Central
- Rural District: Madvarat

Population (2006)
  - Total: 63
- Time zone: UTC+3:30 (IRST)
  - Summer (DST): UTC+4:30 (IRDT)

Yusefabad (Persian: يوسف اباد, also Romanized as Yūsefābād; also known as Yusef Abad Hoomeh and Yūsofābād-e Ḩūmeh) is a village in Madvarat Rural District, in the Central District of Shahr-e Babak County, Kerman Province, Iran. At the 2006 census, its population was 63, in 18 families.
