= Ebrahimabad, Mashhad-e Miqan =

Ebrahimabad ابراهيم اباد
- Village
- Location within Iran
- Coordinates: 34°14′41″N 49°39′52″E
- Country: Iran
- Province: Markazi
- County: Arak
- Bakhsh: Central
- Rural District: Mashhad-e Miqan

Population (2006)
  - Total: 134
- Time zone: UTC+3:30 (IRST)
  - Summer (DST): UTC+4:30 (IRDT)

Ebrahimabad (Persian: ابراهيم اباد, also romanized as Ebrāhīmābād) is a village in Mashhad-e Miqan Rural District, in the Central District of Arak County, Markazi Province, Iran. At the 2006 census, its population was 134, in 34 families.
