= Yusefabad, Anbarabad =

Yusefabad يوسف آباد
- Village
- Location within Iran
- Coordinates: 28°26′48″N 57°50′04″E
- Country: Iran
- Province: Kerman
- County: Anbarabad
- Bakhsh: Central
- Rural District: Aliabad

Population (2006)
  - Total: 1,097
- Time zone: UTC+3:30 (IRST)
  - Summer (DST): UTC+4:30 (IRDT)

Yusefabad (Persian: يوسف آباد, also Romanized as Yūsefābād) is a village in Aliabad Rural District, in the Central District of Anbarabad County, Kerman Province, Iran. At the 2006 census, its population was 1,097, in 251 families.
