= Yusefabad, Ravar =

Yusefabad يوسف اباد
- Village
- Location within Iran
- Coordinates: 31°21′18″N 56°48′25″E
- Country: Iran
- Province: Kerman
- County: Ravar
- Bakhsh: Central
- Rural District: Ravar

Population (2006)
  - Total: 159
- Time zone: UTC+3:30 (IRST)
  - Summer (DST): UTC+4:30 (IRDT)

Yusefabad (Persian: يوسف اباد, also Romanized as Yūsefābād, Yūsofābād, and Yūsufābād) is a village in Ravar Rural District, in the Central District of Ravar County, Kerman Province, Iran. At the 2006 census, its population was 159, in 45 families.
