= Yusefabad, Koshkuiyeh =

Yusefabad يوسفاباد
- Village
- Location within Iran
- Coordinates: 30°35′50″N 55°37′15″E
- Country: Iran
- Province: Kerman
- County: Rafsanjan
- Bakhsh: Koshkuiyeh
- Rural District: Koshkuiyeh

Population (2006)
  - Total: 443
- Time zone: UTC+3:30 (IRST)
  - Summer (DST): UTC+4:30 (IRDT)

Yusefabad (Persian: يوسفاباد, also Romanized as Yūsefābād and Yūsofābād) is a village in Koshkuiyeh Rural District, Koshkuiyeh District, Rafsanjan County, Kerman Province, Iran. At the 2006 census, its population was 443, in 99 families.
