= Shurabad-e Fandaq =

Shurabad-e Fandaq شورآباد فندق
- Village
- Location within Iran
- Coordinates: 28°23′48″N 60°27′33″E
- Country: Iran
- Province: Sistan and Baluchestan
- County: Khash
- Bakhsh: Nukabad
- Rural District: Gowhar Kuh

Population (2006)
  - Total: 47
- Time zone: UTC+3:30 (IRST)
  - Summer (DST): UTC+4:30 (IRDT)

Shurabad-e Fandaq (Persian: شورآباد فندق, also Romanized as Shūrābād-e Fandaq; also known as Shūrābād) is a village in Gowhar Kuh Rural District, Nukabad District, Khash County, Sistan and Baluchestan Province, Iran. At the 2006 census, its population was 47, in 7 families.
