= Ebrahimabad, Jiroft =

Ebrahimabad ابراهيماباد
- Village
- Location within Iran
- Coordinates: 28°37′00″N 57°44′00″E
- Country: Iran
- Province: Kerman
- County: Jiroft
- Bakhsh: Central
- Rural District: Khatunabad

Population (2006)
  - Total: 561
- Time zone: UTC+3:30 (IRST)
  - Summer (DST): UTC+4:30 (IRDT)

Ebrahimabad (Persian: ابراهيماباد, also Romanized as Ebrāhīmābād) is a village in Khatunabad Rural District, in the Central District of Jiroft County, Kerman Province, Iran. At the 2006 census, its population was 561, in 126 families.
