= Jahanabad-e Markazi =

Jahanabad-e Markazi جهان ابادمركزي
- Village
- Location within Iran
- Coordinates: 30°32′24″N 51°33′54″E
- Country: Iran
- Province: Kohgiluyeh and Boyer-Ahmad
- County: Boyer-Ahmad
- Bakhsh: Central
- Rural District: Dasht-e Rum

Population (2006)
  - Total: 62
- Time zone: UTC+3:30 (IRST)
  - Summer (DST): UTC+4:30 (IRDT)

Jahanabad-e Markazi (Persian: جهان ابادمركزي, also Romanized as Jahānābād-e Markazī; also known as Jahānābād-e Mīānī and Jahānābād-e Vosţá) is a village in Dasht-e Rum Rural District, in the Central District of Boyer-Ahmad County, Kohgiluyeh and Boyer-Ahmad Province, Iran. At the 2006 census, its population was 62, in 13 families.
