= Yusefabad, Dorud =

Yusefabad يوسف آباد
- Village
- Location within Iran
- Coordinates: 33°33′14″N 49°01′03″E
- Country: Iran
- Province: Lorestan
- County: Dorud
- Bakhsh: Central
- Rural District: Dorud

Population (2006)
  - Total: 224
- Time zone: UTC+3:30 (IRST)
  - Summer (DST): UTC+4:30 (IRDT)

Yusefabad (Persian: يوسف آباد, also Romanized as Yūsefābād and Yūsofābād) is a village in Dorud Rural District, in the Central District of Dorud County, Lorestan Province, Iran. At the 2006 census, its population was 224, in 48 families.
