= Yusefabad, Manujan =

Yusefabad يوسف اباد
- Village
- Location within Iran
- Coordinates: 27°23′30″N 57°31′24″E
- Country: Iran
- Province: Kerman
- County: Manujan
- Bakhsh: Central
- Rural District: Qaleh

Population (2006)
  - Total: 467
- Time zone: UTC+3:30 (IRST)
  - Summer (DST): UTC+4:30 (IRDT)

Yusefabad (Persian: يوسف اباد, also Romanized as Yūsefābād) is a village in Qaleh Rural District, in the Central District of Manujan County, Kerman Province, Iran. At the 2006 census, its population was 467, with 93 families.
