= Dashtabad, Narmashir =

Dashtabad دشت اباد
- Village
- Location within Iran
- Coordinates: 28°59′39″N 58°40′07″E
- Country: Iran
- Province: Kerman
- County: Narmashir
- Bakhsh: Central
- Rural District: Posht Rud

Population (2006)
  - Total: 683
- Time zone: UTC+3:30 (IRST)
  - Summer (DST): UTC+4:30 (IRDT)

Dashtabad (Persian: دشت اباد, also Romanized as Dashtābād; also known as Sa‘ādatābād) is a village in Posht Rud Rural District, in the Central District of Narmashir County, Kerman Province, Iran. At the 2006 census, its population was 683, in 161 families.
