= Shurabad-e Nur Mohammad =

Shurabad-e Nur Mohammad شورآباد نورمحمد
- Village
- Location within Iran
- Coordinates: 28°59′57″N 58°49′40″E
- Country: Iran
- Province: Kerman
- County: Narmashir
- Bakhsh: Central
- Rural District: Posht Rud

Population (2006)
  - Total: 426
- Time zone: UTC+3:30 (IRST)
  - Summer (DST): UTC+4:30 (IRDT)

Shurabad-e Nur Mohammad (Persian: شورآباد نورمحمد, also Romanized as Shūrābād-e Nūr Moḩammad; also known as Shoor Abad, Shūrābād, Shūrābād-e Nūr, and Shūrābād-e Zard) is a village in Posht Rud Rural District, in the Central District of Narmashir County, Kerman Province, Iran. At the 2006 census, its population was 426, in 98 families.
