= Jahanabad, Firuzabad =

Jahanabad جهان اباد
- Village
- Location within Iran
- Coordinates: 33°51′48″N 48°10′28″E
- Country: Iran
- Province: Lorestan
- County: Selseleh
- Bakhsh: Firuzabad
- Rural District: Firuzabad

Population (2006)
  - Total: 125
- Time zone: UTC+3:30 (IRST)
  - Summer (DST): UTC+4:30 (IRDT)

Jahanabad (Persian: جهان اباد, also Romanized as Jahānābād; also known as Jahānshāhābād) is a village in the Firuzabad Rural District, Firuzabad District, Selseleh County, Lorestan Province, Iran. At the 2006 census, its population was 125, in 24 families.
