= Dashtabad, Yazd =

Dashtabad دشت اباد
- Village
- Location within Iran
- Coordinates: 31°23′38″N 53°59′51″E
- Country: Iran
- Province: Yazd
- County: Taft
- Bakhsh: Nir
- Rural District: Garizat

Population (2006)
  - Total: 131
- Time zone: UTC+3:30 (IRST)
  - Summer (DST): UTC+4:30 (IRDT)

Dashtabad (Persian: دشت اباد, also Romanized as Dashtābād) is a village in Garizat Rural District, Nir District, Taft County, Yazd Province, Iran. At the 2006 census, its population was 131, in 35 families.
