= Emamiyeh-e Sofla =

Emamiyeh-e Sofla اماميه سفلي
- Village
- Location within Iran
- Coordinates: 34°15′23″N 46°03′03″E
- Country: Iran
- Province: Kermanshah
- County: Sarpol-e Zahab
- Bakhsh: Central
- Rural District: Qaleh Shahin

Population (2006)
  - Total: 810
- Time zone: UTC+3:30 (IRST)
  - Summer (DST): UTC+4:30 (IRDT)

Emamiyeh-e Sofla (Persian: اماميه سفلي, also Romanized as Emāmīyeh-ye Soflá and Emāmīyeh Soflá; also known as Sagān, Sagān-e Pā’īn, and Sagān-e Sofla') is a village in Qaleh Shahin Rural District, in the Central District of Sarpol-e Zahab County, Kermanshah Province, Iran. At the 2006 census, its population was 810, in 174 families.
