= Esmatabad, Taft =

Esmatabad عصمت اباد
- Village
- Location within Iran
- Coordinates: 31°29′41″N 53°49′58″E
- Country: Iran
- Province: Yazd
- County: Taft
- Bakhsh: Central
- Rural District: Dehshir

Population (2006)
  - Total: 35
- Time zone: UTC+3:30 (IRST)
  - Summer (DST): UTC+4:30 (IRDT)

Esmatabad (Persian: عصمت اباد, also Romanized as ‘Eşmatābād and ‘Esmatābād) is a village in Dehshir Rural District, in the Central District of Taft County, Yazd Province, Iran. At the 2006 census, its population was 35, in 13 families.
