= Ebrahimabad, Sirjan =

Ebrahimabad ابراهيم‌آباد
- Village
- Location within Iran
- Coordinates: 29°18′53″N 55°47′45″E
- Country: Iran
- Province: Kerman
- County: Sirjan
- Bakhsh: Central
- Rural District: Malekabad

Population (2006)
  - Total: 679
- Time zone: UTC+3:30 (IRST)
  - Summer (DST): UTC+4:30 (IRDT)

Ebrahimabad (Persian: ابراهيم‌آباد, also Romanized as Ebrāhīmābād and Ibrāhīmābād) is a village in Malekabad Rural District, in the Central District of Sirjan County, Kerman Province, Iran. At the 2006 census, its population was 679, in 154 families.
