= Ebrahimabad, Sepidan =

Ebrahimabad ابراهيم اباد
- Village
- Location within Iran
- Coordinates: 30°01′02″N 52°23′18″E
- Country: Iran
- Province: Fars
- County: Sepidan
- Bakhsh: Beyza
- Rural District: Beyza

Population (2006)
  - Total: 356
- Time zone: UTC+3:30 (IRST)
  - Summer (DST): UTC+4:30 (IRDT)

Ebrahimabad (Persian: ابراهيم اباد, also Romanized as Ebrāhīmābād) is a village in Beyza Rural District, Beyza District, Sepidan County, Fars province, Iran. At the 2006 census, its population was 356, in 91 families.
