= Ebrahimabad-e Cheshmeh Nazer =

Ebrahimabad-e Cheshmeh Nazer ابراهيم ابادچشمه نظر
- Village
- Country: Iran
- Province: Yazd
- County: Mehriz
- Bakhsh: Central
- Rural District: Bahadoran

Population (2006)
  - Total: 44
- Time zone: UTC+3:30 (IRST)
  - Summer (DST): UTC+4:30 (IRDT)

Ebrahimabad-e Cheshmeh Nazer (Persian: ابراهيم ابادچشمه نظر, also Romanized as Ebrāhīmābād-e Cheshmeh Naz̧er) is a village in Bahadoran Rural District, in the Central District of Mehriz County, Yazd Province, Iran. At the 2006 census, its population was 44, in 8 families.
