= Yusefabad, Amlash =

Yusefabad يوسف آباد
- Village
- Location within Iran
- Coordinates: 37°03′49″N 50°10′16″E
- Country: Iran
- Province: Gilan
- County: Amlash
- Bakhsh: Central
- Rural District: Amlash-e Jonubi

Population (2006)
  - Total: 99
- Time zone: UTC+3:30 (IRST)
  - Summer (DST): UTC+4:30 (IRDT)

Yusefabad (Persian: يوسف آباد, also Romanized as Yūsefābād) is a village in Amlash-e Jonubi Rural District, in the Central District of Amlash County, Gilan Province, Iran. At the 2006 census, its population was 99, in 31 families.
