= Shurabad, Kerman =

Shurabad شورآباد
- Village
- Location within Iran
- Coordinates: 30°28′40″N 57°48′42″E
- Country: Iran
- Province: Kerman
- County: Kerman
- Bakhsh: Shahdad
- Rural District: Takab

Population (2006)
  - Total: 212
- Time zone: UTC+3:30 (IRST)
  - Summer (DST): UTC+4:30 (IRDT)

Shurabad (Persian: شورآباد, also Romanized as Shūrābād; also known as Shūr) is a village in Takab Rural District, Shahdad District, Kerman County, Kerman Province, Iran. At the 2006 census, its population was 212, in 63 families.
