= Ebrahimabad, Hirmand =

Ebrahimabad ابراهيم اباد
- Village
- Location within Iran
- Coordinates: 30°55′13″N 61°36′41″E
- Country: Iran
- Province: Sistan and Baluchestan
- County: Hirmand
- Bakhsh: Central
- Rural District: Jahanabad

Population (2006)
  - Total: 138
- Time zone: UTC+3:30 (IRST)
  - Summer (DST): UTC+4:30 (IRDT)

Ebrahimabad (Persian: ابراهيم اباد, also romanized as Ebrāhīmābād) is a village in Jahanabad Rural District, in the Central District of Hirmand County, Sistan and Baluchestan Province, Iran. At the 2006 census, its population was 138, in 22 families.
