= Ebrahimabad, Dehgolan =

Ebrahimabad ابراهيم آباد
- Village
- Location within Iran
- Coordinates: 35°18′55″N 47°09′49″E
- Country: Iran
- Province: Kurdistan
- County: Dehgolan
- Bakhsh: Central
- Rural District: Quri Chay

Population (2006)
  - Total: 163
- Time zone: UTC+3:30 (IRST)
  - Summer (DST): UTC+4:30 (IRDT)

Ebrahimabad (Persian: ابراهيم آباد, also Romanized as Ebrāhīmābād and Ibrahimabad) is a village in Quri Chay Rural District, in the Central District of Dehgolan County, Kurdistan Province, Iran. At the 2006 census, its population was 163, in 34 families. The village is populated by Kurds.
