= Baba Sheykh Ali, Kermanshah =

Village in Kermanshah, Iran

Baba Sheykh Ali باباشيخ علي
- Village
- Location within Iran
- Coordinates: 34°46′54″N 47°28′01″E
- Country: Iran
- Province: Kermanshah
- County: Sonqor
- Bakhsh: Kolyai
- Rural District: Satar

Population (2006)
  - Total: 198
- Time zone: UTC+3:30 (IRST)
  - Summer (DST): UTC+4:30 (IRDT)

Baba Sheykh Ali (Persian: باباشيخ علي, also Romanized as Bābā Sheykh ‘Alī and Bābā Sheykh‘alī; also known as Emāmīyeh) is a village in Satar Rural District, Kolyai District, Sonqor County, Kermanshah Province, Iran. At the 2006 census, its population was 198, in 51 families.
