= Ebrahimabad-e Shur =

Ebrahimabad-e Shur ابراهيم اباد شور
- Village
- Location within Iran
- Coordinates: 30°30′58″N 55°58′21″E
- Country: Iran
- Province: Kerman
- County: Rafsanjan
- Bakhsh: Central
- Rural District: Azadegan

Population (2006)
  - Total: 49
- Time zone: UTC+3:30 (IRST)
  - Summer (DST): UTC+4:30 (IRDT)

Ebrahimabad-e Shur (Persian: ابراهيم اباد شور, also Romanized as Ebrāhīmābād-e Shūr and Ebrahim Abad Shoor; also known as Ebrāhīmābād and Ibrāhīmābād) is a village in Azadegan Rural District, in the Central District of Rafsanjan County, Kerman Province, Iran. At the 2006 census, its population was 49, in 11 families.
