= Jahanabad, Selseleh =

Jahanabad جهان اباد
- Village
- Location within Iran
- Coordinates: 33°47′54″N 48°18′04″E
- Country: Iran
- Province: Lorestan
- County: Selseleh
- Bakhsh: Central
- Rural District: Honam

Population (2006)
  - Total: 69
- Time zone: UTC+3:30 (IRST)
  - Summer (DST): UTC+4:30 (IRDT)

Jahanabad (Persian: جهان اباد, also Romanized as Jahānābād) is a village in Honam Rural District, Central District of Selseleh County, Lorestan Province, Iran. At the 2006 census, its population was 69, in 16 families.
