= Ebrahim Bur =

Ebrahim Bur ابراهيم بور
- Village
- Location within Iran
- Coordinates: 36°05′25″N 45°25′24″E
- Country: Iran
- Province: West Azerbaijan
- County: Sardasht
- Bakhsh: Central
- Rural District: Baryaji

Population (2006)
  - Total: 49
- Time zone: UTC+3:30 (IRST)
  - Summer (DST): UTC+4:30 (IRDT)

Ebrahim Bur (Persian: ابراهيم بور, also Romanized as Ebrāhīm Būr; also known as Ebrāhīmābād) is a village in Baryaji Rural District, in the Central District of Sardasht County, West Azerbaijan Province, Iran. At the 2006 census, its population was 49, in 10 families.
