= Yusefabad, Khoy =

Village in Khoy County, Iran

Yusefabad يوسف اباد
- Village
- Location within Iran
- Coordinates: 38°25′02″N 44°22′25″E
- Country: Iran
- Province: West Azerbaijan
- County: Khoy
- Bakhsh: Qatur
- Rural District: Qatur

Population (2006)
  - Total: 53
- Time zone: UTC+3:30 (IRST)
  - Summer (DST): UTC+4:30 (IRDT)

Yusefabad (Persian: يوسف اباد, also Romanized as Yūsefābād; also known as Yūsefābād-e Gūlar) is a village in Qatur Rural District, Qatur District, Khoy County, West Azerbaijan Province, Iran. At the 2006 census, its population was 53, in 11 families.
