= Ebrahimabad, Vahdat =

Ebrahimabad ابراهيم اباد
- Village
- Location within Iran
- Coordinates: 30°46′36″N 56°35′51″E
- Country: Iran
- Province: Kerman
- County: Zarand
- Bakhsh: Central
- Rural District: Vahdat

Population (2006)
  - Total: 767
- Time zone: UTC+3:30 (IRST)
  - Summer (DST): UTC+4:30 (IRDT)

Ebrahimabad (Persian: ابراهيم اباد, also Romanized as Ebrāhīmābād and Ibrāhīmābād) is a village in Vahdat Rural District, in the Central District of Zarand County, Kerman Province, Iran. At the 2006 census, its population was 767, in 176 families.
