= Ebrahimabad, Mehriz =

Ebrahimabad ابراهيم اباد
- Village
- Location within Iran
- Coordinates: 31°38′30″N 54°19′39″E
- Country: Iran
- Province: Yazd
- County: Mehriz
- Bakhsh: Central
- Rural District: Miankuh

Population (2006)
  - Total: 42
- Time zone: UTC+3:30 (IRST)
  - Summer (DST): UTC+4:30 (IRDT)

Ebrahimabad (Persian: ابراهيم اباد, also Romanized as Ebrāhīmābād) is a village in Miankuh Rural District, in the Central District of Mehriz County, Yazd Province, Iran.

== Demographics ==
At the 2006 census, its population was 42, in 16 families.
