= Yusefabad-e Tudak =

Yusefabad-e Tudak يوسف ابادتودك
- Village
- Country: Iran
- Province: Sistan and Baluchestan
- County: Khash
- Bakhsh: Nukabad
- Rural District: Taftan-e Jonubi

Population (2006)
  - Total: 19
- Time zone: UTC+3:30 (IRST)
  - Summer (DST): UTC+4:30 (IRDT)

Yusefabad-e Tudak (Persian: يوسف ابادتودك, also Romanized as Yūsefābād-e Tūdak) is a village in Taftan-e Jonubi Rural District, Nukabad District, Khash County, Sistan and Baluchestan Province, Iran. At the 2006 census, its population was 19, in 5 families.
