= Ebrahimabad, Torbat-e Jam =

Ebrahimabad ابراهيم اباد
- Village
- Location within Iran
- Coordinates: 35°21′37″N 60°27′14″E
- Country: Iran
- Province: Razavi Khorasan
- County: Torbat-e Jam
- Bakhsh: Central
- Rural District: Mian Jam

Population (2006)
  - Total: 18
- Time zone: UTC+3:30 (IRST)
  - Summer (DST): UTC+4:30 (IRDT)

Ebrahimabad (Persian: ابراهيم اباد, also Romanized as Ebrāhīmābād; also known as Chāh-e Ḩājj Ḩoseyn Dūr Andīsh) is a village in Mian Jam Rural District, in the Central District of Torbat-e Jam County, Razavi Khorasan Province, Iran. At the 2006 census, its population was 18, in 5 families.
