= Esmatabad, Mehriz =

Esmatabad عصمت اباد
- Village
- Location within Iran
- Coordinates: 31°32′36″N 54°26′19″E
- Country: Iran
- Province: Yazd
- County: Mehriz
- Bakhsh: Central
- Rural District: Khormiz

Population (2022)
  - Total: 1,720
- Time zone: UTC+3:30 (IRST)
  - Summer (DST): UTC+4:30 (IRDT)

Esmatabad (Persian: عصمت اباد, also ‘Eşmatābād; is a village in Khormiz Rural District, in the Central District of Mehriz County, Yazd Province, Iran. At the 2022 census, its population was 1720, in 486 families.
