= Ebrahimabad, Mud =

Ebrahimabad ابراهيم اباد
- Village
- Location within Iran
- Coordinates: 32°50′26″N 59°35′18″E
- Country: Iran
- Province: South Khorasan
- County: Sarbisheh
- Bakhsh: Mud
- Rural District: Mud

Population (2006)
  - Total: 114
- Time zone: UTC+3:30 (IRST)
  - Summer (DST): UTC+4:30 (IRDT)

Ebrahimabad (Persian: ابراهيم اباد, also Romanized as Ebrāhīmābād and Ibrāhīmābād; also known as Ebrahim Abad Mo’men Abad) is a village in Mud Rural District, Mud District, Sarbisheh County, South Khorasan Province, Iran. According to the 2006 census, it had a population of 114 in 33 families.
