= Dashtabad-e Sofla =

Dashtabad-e Sofla دشت ابادسفلي
- Village
- Location within Iran
- Coordinates: 33°10′30″N 47°21′18″E
- Country: Iran
- Province: Ilam
- County: Darreh Shahr
- Bakhsh: Central
- Rural District: Zarrin Dasht

Population (2006)
  - Total: 95
- Time zone: UTC+3:30 (IRST)
  - Summer (DST): UTC+4:30 (IRDT)

Dashtabad-e Sofla (Persian: دشت ابادسفلي, also Romanized as Dashtābād-e Soflá; also known as Dashtābād) is a village in Zarrin Dasht Rural District, in the Central District of Darreh Shahr County, Ilam Province, Iran. At the 2006 census, its population was 95, in 16 families. The village is populated by Kurds.
