= Jahanabad-e Olya, Golestan =

Village in Golestan province, Iran

Jahanabad-e Olya Persian: جهان ابادعليا
- Village
- Location within Iran
- Coordinates: 36°56′58″N 54°36′10″E
- Country: Iran
- Province: Golestan
- County: Gorgan
- District: Baharan
- Rural District: Qoroq

Population (2016)
  - Total: 174
- Time zone: UTC+3:30 (IRST)

Jahanabad-e Olya (Persian: جهان ابادعليا) (Note: Also romanized as Jahānābād-e ‘Olyā; also known as Jahānābād-e Bālā) is a village in Qoroq Rural District of Baharan District in Gorgan County, Golestan province, Iran.

== Demographics ==
=== Population ===
At the time of the 2006 National Census, the village's population was 220 in 51 households. The following census in 2011 counted 228 people in 56 households. The 2016 census measured the population of the village as 174 people in 50 households.
