= Jahanabad-e Baraftab =

Jahanabad-e Baraftab جهان ابادبرافتاب
- Village
- Location within Iran
- Coordinates: 30°33′31″N 51°32′34″E
- Country: Iran
- Province: Kohgiluyeh and Boyer-Ahmad
- County: Boyer-Ahmad
- Bakhsh: Central
- Rural District: Dasht-e Rum

Population (2006)
  - Total: 715
- Time zone: UTC+3:30 (IRST)
  - Summer (DST): UTC+4:30 (IRDT)

Jahanabad-e Baraftab (Persian: جهان ابادبرافتاب, also Romanized as Jahānābād-e Barāftāb; also known as Jahānābād and Jahānābād-e Bālā) is a village in Dasht-e Rum Rural District, in the Central District of Boyer-Ahmad County, Kohgiluyeh and Boyer-Ahmad Province, Iran. At the 2006 census, its population was 715, in 118 families.
