= Jahanabad-e Olya, Sistan and Baluchestan =

Jahanabad-e Olya جهان ابادعليا
- Village
- Location within Iran
- Coordinates: 31°03′27″N 61°45′24″E
- Country: Iran
- Province: Sistan and Baluchestan
- County: Hirmand
- Bakhsh: Central
- Rural District: Jahanabad

Population (2006)
  - Total: 192
- Time zone: UTC+3:30 (IRST)
  - Summer (DST): UTC+4:30 (IRDT)

Jahanabad-e Olya (Persian: جهان ابادعليا, also Romanized as Jahānābād-e ‘Olyā; also known as Jahānābād-e Bālā) is a village in Jahanabad Rural District, in the Central District of Hirmand County, Sistan and Baluchestan Province, Iran. At the 2006 census, its population was 192, in 36 families.
