= Zabol Qaleh =

Zabol Qaleh زابل قلعه
- Village
- Location within Iran
- Coordinates: 37°24′51″N 59°04′29″E
- Country: Iran
- Province: Razavi Khorasan
- County: Dargaz
- Bakhsh: Chapeshlu
- Rural District: Qara Bashlu

Population (2006)
  - Total: 60
- Time zone: UTC+3:30 (IRST)
  - Summer (DST): UTC+4:30 (IRDT)

Zabol Qaleh (Persian: زابل قلعه, also romanized as Zābol Qal‘eh; also known as Jānābād and Jahānābād) is a village in Qara Bashlu Rural District, Chapeshlu District, Dargaz County, Razavi Khorasan Province, Iran. At the 2006 census, its population was 60, in 14 families.
