= Jahanabad, Nahavand =

Village in Hamadan province, Iran

Jahanabad Persian: جهان اباد
- Village
- Location within Iran
- Coordinates: 34°08′13″N 48°25′08″E
- Country: Iran
- Province: Hamadan
- County: Nahavand
- District: Central
- Rural District: Shaban

Population (2016)
  - Total: 2,232
- Time zone: UTC+3:30 (IRST)

Jahanabad (Persian: جهان اباد) (Note: Also romanized as Jahānābād; also known as Jānābād, Jonābād, and Jūnabād) is a village in Shaban Rural District of the Central District in Nahavand County, Hamadan province, Iran.

== Demographics ==
=== Population ===
At the time of the 2006 National Census, the village's population was 2,022 in 532 households. The following census in 2011 counted 2,347 people in 711 households. The 2016 census measured the population of the village as 2,232 people in 695 households.
