= Jahanabad-e Sofla, Kohgiluyeh and Boyer-Ahmad =

Jahanabad-e Sofla جهان ابادسفلي
- Village
- Location within Iran
- Coordinates: 30°33′16″N 51°32′57″E
- Country: Iran
- Province: Kohgiluyeh and Boyer-Ahmad
- County: Boyer-Ahmad
- Bakhsh: Central
- Rural District: Dasht-e Rum

Population (2006)
  - Total: 196
- Time zone: UTC+3:30 (IRST)
  - Summer (DST): UTC+4:30 (IRDT)

Jahanabad-e Sofla (Persian: جهان ابادسفلي, also Romanized as Jahānābād-e Soflá; also known as Jahānābād and Jahānābād-e Pā’īn) is a village in Dasht-e Rum Rural District, in the Central District of Boyer-Ahmad County, Kohgiluyeh and Boyer-Ahmad Province, Iran. At the 2006 census, its population was 196, in 37 families.
