= Fahraj =

City in Kerman province, Iran

Fahraj Persian: فهرج
- City
- Location within Iran
- Coordinates: 28°56′45″N 58°53′06″E
- Country: Iran
- Province: Kerman
- County: Fahraj
- District: Central

Population (2016)
  - Total: 6,876
- Time zone: UTC+3:30 (IRST)

Fahraj (Persian: فهرج) (Note: Also romanized as Fahrej; formerly Narmāshīr (نرماشير) and Irānshahr (ایرانشهر)) is a city in the Central District of Fahraj County, Kerman province, Iran, serving as capital of both the county and the district. It is also the administrative center for Fahraj Rural District. As a village, it was the capital of the former Narmashir District of Bam County until its capital was transferred to the village of Rostamabad, now the city of Narmashir and the capital of Narmashir County.

== Demographics ==
=== Ethnicity ===
The people are mostly Persians, with a minority of Baluchis.

=== Population ===
At the time of the 2006 National Census, the city's population was 6,105 in 1,428 households, when it was capital of the former Fahraj District of Bam County. The following census in 2011 counted 11,939 people in 3,087 households, by which time the district had been separated from the county in the establishment of Fahraj County. Fahraj was transferred to the new Central District as the county's capital. The 2016 census measured the population of the city as 6,876 people in 1,850 households.
