= Siah Khan, Hirmand =

Siah Khan سياه خان
- Village
- Location within Iran
- Coordinates: 30°56′58″N 61°34′50″E
- Country: Iran
- Province: Sistan and Baluchestan
- County: Hirmand
- Bakhsh: Central
- Rural District: Dust Mohammad

Population (2006)
  - Total: 58
- Time zone: UTC+3:30 (IRST)
  - Summer (DST): UTC+4:30 (IRDT)

Siah Khan (Persian: سياه خان, also Romanized as Sīāh Khān; also known as Jānābād-e ‘Alīja‘far and Sīāh Khān-e Pīrī) is a village in Dust Mohammad Rural District, in the Central District of Hirmand County, Sistan and Baluchestan Province, Iran. At the 2006 census, its population was 58, in 12 families.
