= Fahraj District =

Former district in Kerman province, Iran

Fahraj District Persian: بخش فهرج
- Former District
- Location within Iran
- Coordinates: 29°10′N 59°09′E
- Country: Iran
- Province: Kerman
- County: Bam
- Capital: Fahraj

Population (2006)
  - Total: 23,442
- Time zone: UTC+3:30 (IRST)

Fahraj District (Persian: بخش فهرجم) is a former administrative division of Bam County, Kerman province, Iran. Its capital was the city of Fahraj.

== History ==
After the 2006 National Census, the district was separated from the county in the establishment of Fahraj County.

== Demographics ==
=== Population ===
At the time of the 2006 census, the district's population was 23,442 in 5,409 households.

=== Administrative divisions ===
Fahraj District Population
| Administrative Divisions | 2006 |
|---|---|
| Borj-e Akram RD | 9,465 |
| Fahraj RD | 7,872 |
| Fahraj (city) | 6,105 |
| Total | 23,442 |
RD = Rural District
