= Borj-e Akram Rural District =

Rural district in Kerman province, Iran

Borj-e Akram Rural District Persian: دهستان برج اكرم
- Rural District
- Location within Iran
- Coordinates: 28°50′37″N 58°50′22″E
- Country: Iran
- Province: Kerman
- County: Fahraj
- District: Central
- Capital: Borj-e Akram

Population (2016)
  - Total: 19,165
- Time zone: UTC+3:30 (IRST)

Borj-e Akram Rural District (Persian: دهستان برج اكرم) is in the Central District of Fahraj County, Kerman province, Iran. Its capital is the village of Borj-e Akram.

== Demographics ==
=== Population ===
At the time of the 2006 National Census, the rural district's population (as a part of the former Fahraj District of Bam County) was 9,465 in 2,224 households. There were 15,150 inhabitants in 4,190 households at the following census of 2011, by which time the district had been separated from the county in the establishment of Fahraj County. The rural district was transferred to the new Central District. The 2016 census measured the population of the rural district as 19,165 in 4,890 households. The most populous of its 45 villages was Borj-e Akram, with 4,281 people.
