= Fahraj Rural District (Fahraj County) =

Rural district in Kerman province, Iran

Fahraj Rural District Persian: دهستان فهرج
- Rural District
- Location within Iran
- Coordinates: 29°13′38″N 59°09′08″E
- Country: Iran
- Province: Kerman
- County: Fahraj
- District: Central
- Capital: Fahraj

Population (2016)
  - Total: 13,779
- Time zone: UTC+3:30 (IRST)

Fahraj Rural District (Persian: دهستان فهرج) is in the Central District of Fahraj County, Kerman province, Iran. It is administered from the city of Fahraj.

== Demographics ==
=== Population ===
At the time of the 2006 National Census, the rural district's population (as a part of the former Fahraj District of Bam County) was 7,872 in 1,757 households. There were 12,782 inhabitants in 3,445 households at the following census of 2011, by which time the district had been separated from the county in the establishment of Fahraj County. The rural district was transferred to the new Central District. The 2016 census measured the population of the rural district as 13,779 in 3,711 households. The most populous of its 56 villages was Borj-e Moaz, with 3,095 people.
