= Negin Kavir District =

District in Kerman province, Iran

Negin Kavir District Persian: بخش نگین کویر
- District
- Location within Iran
- Coordinates: 28°55′06″N 59°14′23″E
- Country: Iran
- Province: Kerman
- County: Fahraj
- Capital: Dehnow-e Eslamabad

Population (2016)
  - Total: 26,922
- Time zone: UTC+3:30 (IRST)

Negin Kavir District (Persian: بخش نگین کویر) is in Fahraj County, Kerman province, Iran. Its capital is the city of Dehnow-e Eslamabad.

== History ==
In 2009, Fahraj District and Chahdegal Rural District were separated from Bam County in the establishment of Fahraj County, which was divided into two districts of two rural districts each, with Fahraj as its capital and only city at the time. After the 2016 National Census, the village of Dehnow-e Eslamabad was elevated to the status of a city.

== Demographics ==
=== Population ===
At the time of the 2011 census, the district's population was 27,357 people in 6,602 households. The 2016 census measured the population of the district as 26,922 inhabitants in 6,643 households.

=== Administrative divisions ===
Negin Kavir District Population
Administrative Divisions	2011	2016
Chahdegal RD	4,524	2,830
Negin Kavir RD	22,833	24,092
Dehnow-e Eslamabad (city) (Note: Became a city after the 2016 census)		
Total	27,357	26,922
RD = Rural District
