= Central District (Fahraj County) =

District in Kerman province, Iran

Central District (Fahraj County) Persian: بخش مرکزی شهرستان فهرج
- District
- Location within Iran
- Coordinates: 29°11′45″N 59°08′36″E
- Country: Iran
- Province: Kerman
- County: Fahraj
- Capital: Fahraj

Population (2016)
  - Total: 39,820
- Time zone: UTC+3:30 (IRST)

The Central District of Fahraj County (Persian: بخش مرکزی شهرستان فهرج) is in Kerman province, Iran. Its capital is the city of Fahraj.

== History ==
In 2009, Fahraj District and Chahdegal Rural District were separated from Bam County in the establishment of Fahraj County, which was divided into two districts of two rural districts each, with Fahraj as its capital and only city at the time.

== Demographics ==
=== Population ===
At the time of the 2011 National Census, the district's population was 39,871 people in 10,722 households. The 2016 census measured the population of the district as 39,820 inhabitants in 10,451 households.

=== Administrative divisions ===
Central District (Fahraj County) Population
Administrative Divisions	2011	2016
Borj-e Akram RD	15,150	19,165
Fahraj RD	12,782	13,779
Fahraj (city)	11,939	6,876
Total	39,871	39,820
RD = Rural District
