= Chahdegal Rural District =

Rural district in Kerman province, Iran

Chahdegal Rural District Persian: دهستان چاهدگال
- Rural District
- Location within Iran
- Coordinates: 28°54′52″N 59°21′26″E
- Country: Iran
- Province: Kerman
- County: Fahraj
- District: Negin Kavir
- Capital: Hasanabad-e Chahdegan

Population (2016)
  - Total: 2,830
- Time zone: UTC+3:30 (IRST)

Chahdegal Rural District (Persian: دهستان چاهدگال) is in Negin Kavir District of Fahraj County, Kerman province, Iran. Its capital is the village of Hasanabad-e Chahdegan.

== Demographics ==
=== Population ===
At the time of the 2006 National Census, the rural district's population (as a part of the former Rigan District of Bam County) was 17,849 in 4,159 households. There were 4,524 inhabitants in 1,114 households at the following census of 2011, by which time the rural district had been separated from the county in the establishment of Fahraj County. The rural district was transferred to the new Negin Kavir District. The 2016 census measured the population of the rural district as 2,830 in 807 households. The most populous of its 32 villages was Aliabad-e Chahdegan, with 450 people.
