= Fahraj County =

County in Kerman province, Iran

Fahraj County Persian: شهرستان فهرج
- County
- Location of Fahraj County in Kerman province (center right, pink)

- Location of Kerman province in Iran
- Coordinates: 29°10′N 59°09′E
- Country: Iran
- Province: Kerman
- Capital: Fahraj
- Districts: Central, Negin Kavir

Population (2016)
  - Total: 67,096
- Time zone: UTC+3:30 (IRST)

Fahraj County (Persian: شهرستان فهرج) is in Kerman province, Iran. Its capital is the city of Fahraj.

== History ==
In 2009, Fahraj District and Chahdegal Rural District were separated from Bam County in the establishment of Fahraj County, which was divided into two districts of two rural districts each, with Fahraj as its capital and only city at the time.

After the 2016 National Census, the village of Dehnow-e Eslamabad was elevated to the status of a city.

== Demographics ==
=== Population ===
At the time of the 2011 census, the county's population was 68,038 people in 17,521 households. The 2016 census measured the population of the county as 67,096 in 17,195 households.

=== Administrative divisions ===
Fahraj County's population history and administrative structure over two consecutive censuses are shown in the following table.

Fahraj County Population
Administrative Divisions	2011	2016
Central District	39,871	39,820
Borj-e Akram RD	15,150	19,165
Fahraj RD	12,782	13,779
Fahraj (city)	11,939	6,876
Negin Kavir District	27,357	26,922
Chahdegal RD	4,524	2,830
Negin Kavir RD	22,833	24,092
Dehnow-e Eslamabad (city) (Note: Became a city after the 2016 census)		
Total	68,038	67,096
RD = Rural District

== See also ==
Media related to Fahraj County at Wikimedia Commons
