= Dehnow =

Dehnow, Deh Now, Deh-e Now, Dehno, Deh Nau or Deh-i-Nau (Persian: دهنو, meaning "new village") may refer to:

== Afghanistan ==
- Deh Naw, a neighborhood in western Kabul
- Shahr-i Now, a town in Khwahan District Badakhshan province
- Deh Now, Afghanistan, a village in Balkh Province
- Deh-e Now, former name of Shirin Tagab District

== Iran ==
=== Bushehr Province ===
- Deh Now, Dashtestan, a village in Dashtestan County
- Dehnow, Kangan, a village in Kangan County
- Deh-e Now, Tangestan, a village in Tangestan County
- Dehnow, Delvar, a village in Tangestan County

=== Chaharmahal and Bakhtiari Province ===
- Dehnow, Ardal, a village in Ardal County
- Dehnow, Borujen, a village in Borujen County
- Deh Now-ye Olya, Kiar, a village in Kiar County
- Deh Now-ye Sofla, Kiar, a village in Kiar County
- Dehnow-ye Olya, Kuhrang, a village in Kuhrang County
- Dehnow-ye Sofla, Kuhrang, a village in Kuhrang County
- Deh Now, Falard, a village in Lordegan County
- Deh Now, Khanmirza, a village in Lordegan County
- Dehnow-e Abbasali, a village in Lordegan County
- Dehnow-e Alibaba, a village in Lordegan County
- Deh Now-e Allah Morad, a village in Lordegan County
- Deh Now-e Bardbor, a village in Lordegan County
- Deh Now-ye Barez, a village in Lordegan County
- Deh Now-e Gork Allah, a village in Lordegan County
- Dehnow-e Gudarz, a village in Lordegan County
- Deh Now-e Gudsar, a village in Lordegan County
- Deh Now-e Hushang Khan, a village in Lordegan County
- Deh Now-e Milas, a village in Lordegan County
- Dehnow-e Mohammad Qoli, a village in Lordegan County
- Dehnow-e Shams Ali, a village in Lordegan County

=== Fars Province ===
==== Arsanjan County ====
- Deh Now, Arsanjan, a village in Arsanjan County

==== Eqlid County ====
- Dehnow, Eqlid, a village in Eqlid County

==== Farashband County ====
- Dehnow, Farashband, a village in Farashband County

==== Firuzabad County ====
- Deh Now, Firuzabad, a village in Firuzabad County

==== Kazerun County ====
- Deh Now, Kazerun, a village in Kazerun County
- Dehnow-e Bushkan, a village in Kazerun County
- Dehnow-e Chamran, a village in Kazerun County
- Dehnow-e Enqelab, a village in Kazerun County
- Dehnow-e Ghuri, a village in Kazerun County
- Dehnow Kashkuli, a village in Kazerun County

==== Khonj County ====
- Deh Now, Khonj, a village in Khonj County

==== Lamerd County ====
- Deh Now, Lamerd, a village in Lamerd County
- Deh Now, Ala-e Marvdasht, a village in Lamerd County
- Deh Now-e Fazeli, a village in Lamerd County

==== Mamasani County ====
- Deh Now, Mamasani, a village in Mamasani County

==== Pasargad County ====
- Dehnow, Pasargad, a village in Pasargad County

==== Rostam County ====
- Dehnow-e Markazi, a village in Rostam County
- Dehnow-e Moqimi, a village in Rostam County
- Deh Now-e Sadat-e Bala, a village in Rostam County
- Deh Now-e Sadat-e Pain, a village in Rostam County
- Dehnow-ye Sadat-e Vosta, a village in Rostam County

==== Sarvestan County ====
- Dehnow, Sarvestan, a village in Sarvestan County

==== Shiraz County ====
- Deh Now, Shiraz, a village in Shiraz County
- Deh Now, Arzhan, a village in Shiraz County
- Deh Now, Siyakh Darengun, a village in Shiraz County

==== Zarrin Dasht County ====
- Deh Now, Zarrin Dasht, a village in Zarrin Dasht County

=== Hamadan Province ===
- Deh Now, Asadabad, a village in Asadabad County
- Deh Now, Bahar, a village in Bahar County
- Dehnow-e Aliabad, a village in Malayer County
- Dehnow-e Avarzaman, a village in Malayer County
- Deh Now-e Abd ol Maleki, a village in Nahavand County
- Deh Now-e Olya, Hamadan, a village in Nahavand County
- Deh Now-e Sofla, Hamadan, a village in Nahavand County
- Shiravand, Hamadan, Nahavand County

=== Hormozgan Province ===
- Dehnow-e Bala, Hormozgan, a village in Bandar Abbas County
- Dehnow-e Pain, Hormozgan, a village in Bandar Abbas County
- Deh Now-e Maragh, a village in Bandar Lengeh County
- Deh Now-e Mir, a village in Bandar Lengeh County
- Deh Now-e Khvajeh, a village in Bastak County
- Deh Now-e Qalandaran, a village in Bastak County
- Deh Now, Hajjiabad, a village in Hajjiabad County
- Dehnow, Minab, a village in Minab County
- Dehnow Damitar-e Shomali, a village in Parsian County
- Deh Now, Rudan, a village in Rudan County
- Dehnow, Rudkhaneh, a village in Rudan County
- Deh Now-e Sarab, a village in Rudan County

=== Isfahan Province ===
- Deh-e Now, Isfahan, a village in Fereydunshahr County

=== Kerman Province ===
==== Anbarabad County ====
- Deh Now-e Allah Verdi, a village in Anbarabad County
- Dehnow-e Fath ol Mobin, a village in Anbarabad County
- Dehnow-e Shahsavar Khan, a village in Anbarabad County

==== Arzuiyeh County ====
- Dehnow, Arzuiyeh, a village in Arzuiyeh County

==== Baft County ====
- Dehnow, Fathabad, a village in Baft County

==== Bam County ====
- Deh Now, Bam, a village in Bam County
- Deh Now-e Yek, Bam, a village in Bam County

==== Bardsir County ====
- Deh-e Now-e Mashiz, a city in Bardsir County
- Deh Now-e Do, Bardsir, a village in Bardsir County

==== Fahraj County ====
- Dehnow-e Ansari, a village in Fahraj County
- Deh Now-e Behzadi, a village in Fahraj County
- Dehnow-e Eslamabad, a village in Fahraj County
- Dehnow-e Chahdegan, a village in Fahraj County
- Deh Now-e Mirza Zadeh Sejadi, a village in Fahraj County
- Dehnow-e Salehabad, a village in Fahraj County

==== Jiroft County ====
- Dehnow-e Amlak, a village in Jiroft County
- Dehnow-e Yek, Jiroft, a village in Jiroft County

==== Kahnuj County ====
- Dehnow-e Mohammad Khan, a village in Kahnuj County
- Hojjatabad, Kahnuj, a village in Kahnuj County

==== Kerman County ====
- Deh Nevoiyeh, Kerman, a village in Kerman County
- Deh Now, Rayen, a village in Kerman County
- Deh Now-e Salar, a village in Kerman County

==== Kuhbanan County ====
- Deh-e Now-e Kahan, a village in Kuhbanan County
- Deh Now-e Qalandar, a village in Kuhbanan County

==== Manujan County ====
- Deh Now, Manujan, a village in Manujan County
- Deh Now, Aseminun, a village in Manujan County

==== Narmsashir County ====
- Dehnow-ye Abbasabad, a village in Narmashir County
- Deh Now-e Azizabad, a village in Narmashir County
- Deh Now-e Derakhti, a village in Narmashir County
- Deh Now-e Esahaqabad, a village in Narmashir County
- Dehnow-e Mich, a village in Narmashir County
- Deh Now-e Sheykh Ali Khan, a village in Narmashir County

==== Qaleh Ganj County ====
- Dehnow-e Hajj Ali Mohammad, a village in Qaleh Ganj County

==== Rafsanjan County ====
- Dehnow, Rafsanjan, a village in Rafsanjan County
- Deh Now, Azadegan, a village in Rafsanjan County
- Deh-e Now, Nuq, a village in Rafsanjan County
- Dehnow, Razmavaran, a village in Rafsanjan County
- Deh-e Bala, Rafsanjan, a village in Rafsanjan County
- Mahmudiyeh, Rafsanjan, a village in Rafsanjan County

==== Ravar County ====
- Deh-e Now-ye Ali Shahri, a village in Ravar County

==== Rigan County ====
- Deh Now-e Gonbaki, a village in Rigan County
- Dehnow-e Kasurak, a village in Rigan County

==== Rudbar-e Jonubi County ====
- Dehnow-e Jari, a village in Rudbar-e Jonubi County
- Dehnow-e-Kuhestan, a village in Rudbar-e Jonubi County
- Deh Now-e Yarahmadi, a village in Rudbar-e Jonubi County

==== Shahr-e Babak County ====
- Deh Now, Estabraq, a village in Shahr-e Babak County
- Deh Now-e Farrokhzad, a village in Shahr-e Babak County
- Deh-e Now-e Jameh, a village in Shahr-e Babak County
- Deh Now-e Kheyari, a village in Shahr-e Babak County

==== Sirjan County ====
- Deh Now, Sirjan, a village in Sirjan County
- Deh Now-e Qaleh Olya, a village in Sirjan County
- Dehnow-e Yek, Sirjan, a village in Sirjan County

==== Zarand County ====
- Deh-e Now, Zarand, a village in Zarand County
- Deh Now, Sarbanan, a village in Zarand County
- Dehnow-ye Herzang, a village in Zarand County
- Dehnow-e Sang, a village in Zarand County

=== Kermanshah Province ===
- Deh Now, Harsin, a village in Harsin County
- Deh Now, Kangavar, a village in Kangavar County
- Dehnow-e Deh Kohneh, a village in Kangavar County
- Dehnow, Sonqor, a village in Sonqor County

=== Khuzestan Province ===
- Deh Now, Behbahan, a village in Behbahan County
- Dehnow, Dezful, a village in Dezful County
- Deh-e Now, Izeh, a village in Izeh County
- Deh-e Now, Dehdez, a village in Izeh County
- Deh Now-ye Kizavak, a village in Izeh County

=== Kohgiluyeh and Boyer-Ahmad Province ===
- Deh Now-e Darbar, a village in Boyer-Ahmad County
- Deh Now-ye Gelal, a village in Boyer-Ahmad County
- Dehnow-e Jowkar, a village in Boyer-Ahmad County
- Deh Now-e Kakan, a village in Boyer-Ahmad County
- Dehnow-e Ludab, a village in Boyer-Ahmad County
- Dehnow-e Yasuj, a village in Boyer-Ahmad County
- Dehnow-e Emamzadeh Mahmud, a village in Charam County
- Dehnow-e Sarfaryab, a village in Charam County
- Dehnow-e Talkhab, a village in Charam County
- Dehnow-e Tall Gap, a village in Charam County
- Deh Now-e Ali Karami, a village in Dana County
- Deh Now-e Kukhdan, a village in Dana County
- Deh Now-e Darghak, a village in Kohgiluyeh County
- Dehnow-e Telmargh, a village in Kohgiluyeh County

=== Lorestan Province ===
==== Aligudarz County ====
- Dehnow, Aligudarz, a village in Aligudarz County
- Deh-e Now-e Abdolvand, a village in Aligudarz County
- Dehnow Aligar, a village in Aligudarz County

==== Borujerd County ====
- Deh Now, Borujerd, a village in Borujerd County
- Deh Now-ye Moqaddasi, a village in Borujerd County

==== Delfan County ====
- Deh Now, Delfan, a village in Delfan County
- Deh Now-e Karam Ali, a village in Delfan County

==== Dorud County ====
- Deh Now, Dorud, a village in Dorud County

==== Khorramabad County ====
- Dehnow, Dehpir, a village in Khorramabad County
- Deh Now, Kakasharaf, a village in Khorramabad County
- Deh Now Pirjed, a village in Khorramabad County
- Deh Now-ye Suki-ye Olya, a village in Khorramabad County
- Deh-e Now, Qaedrahmat, a village in Khorramabad County
- Deh-e Now, Zagheh, a village Khorramabad Count
- Now Deh, Lorestan, a village in Khorramabad County

==== Selseleh County ====
- Deh Now, Selseleh, a village in Selseleh County

=== Markazi Province ===
- Deh-e Now, Markazi, a village in Khomeyn County
- Dehnow, Markazi, a village in Khondab County

=== Razavi Khorasan Province ===
- Deh-e Now, Bakharz, a village in Bakharz County
- Deh Now, Chenaran, a village in Chenaran County
- Deh Now, Davarzan, a village in Davarzan County
- Deh Now, Fariman, a village in Fariman County
- Deh Now, Gonabad, a village in Gonabad County
- Deh Now, Khalilabad, a village in Khalilabad County
- Deh Now, Khoshab, a village in Khoshab County
- Deh Now-ye Kenar Gusheh, a village in Mashhad County
- Dehnow, Nishapur, a village in Nishapur County
- Deh Now, Fazl, a village in Nishapur County
- Deh Now, Rivand, a village in Nishapur County
- Deh Now-e Kherabeh, a village in Nishapur County
- Deh Now-e Lakzi, a village in Nishapur County
- Deh Now-e Shur, a village in Nishapur County
- Deh Now-ye Hashemabad, a village in Nishapur County
- Deh Now-ye Khaleseh, a village in Nishapur County
- Deh-e Now, Sabzevar, a village in Sabzevar County
- Deh Now, Torbat-e Heydarieh, a village in Torbat-e Heydarieh County
- Deh Now, Torbat-e Jam, a village in Torbat-e Jam County
- Dehnow, Torqabeh and Shandiz, a village in Torqabeh and Shandiz County
- Deh Now, Zaveh, a village in Zaveh County

=== Sistan and Baluchestan Province ===
- Deh Now, Dalgan, a village in Dalgan County
- Deh Now-e Ali Khan, a village in Hirmand County

=== South Khorasan Province ===
- Deh-e Now, Birjand, a village in Birjand County
- Deh Now, Boshruyeh, a village in Boshruyeh County
- Deh Now, Nehbandan, a village in Nehbandan County
- Deh Now, Dastgerdan, a village in Tabas County
- Deh Now, Deyhuk, a village in Tabas County
- Dehnow-ye Fatemeh Barat, a village in Tabas County
- Dehnowvan, a village in Tabas County

=== Tehran Province ===
- Deh-e Now, Tehran, a village in Rey County

=== Yazd Province ===
- Deh Now, Bafq, a village in Bafq County
- Deh-e Now Dasht, a village in Behabad County
- Deh-e Now Molla Esmail, a village in Behabad County
- Deh Now, Khatam, a village in Khatam County
- Deh Now, Yazd, a village in Yazd County

== See also ==
- Deh Now-e Olya (disambiguation)
- Deh Now-e Pain (disambiguation)
- Deh Now-e Sofla (disambiguation)
- Now Deh (disambiguation)
