= Now Deh =

Now Deh and Nowdeh or Naudeh or Nudeh (Persian: نو ده) may refer to:

== Ardabil Province ==
- Now Deh, Khalkhal, a village in Khalkhal County
- Nowdeh, Kowsar, a village in Kowsar County
- Now Deh, Namin, a village in Namin County
- Now Deh, alternate name of Nowjeh Deh, Ardabil, a village in Namin County

== Gilan Province ==
- Now Deh, Fuman, a village in Fuman County
- Nowdeh, Rasht, a village in Rasht County
- Now Deh, Rezvanshahr, a village in Rezvanshahr County
- Now Deh, Amarlu, a village in Rudbar County
- Now Deh, Khorgam, a village in Rudbar County
- Now Deh, Rudsar, a village in Rudsar County
- Now Deh, Shaft, a village in Shaft County
- Now Deh-e Pasikhan, a village in Shaft County
- Nowdeh, Sowme'eh Sara, a village in Sowme'eh Sara County
- Now Deh, Talesh, a village in Talesh County

== Golestan Province ==
- Now Deh, Aliabad, Aliabad County
- Now Deh Khanduz, Azadshahr County
- Now Deh Garrison, Azadshahr County
- Now Deh-e Hajjilar, Azadshahr County
- Now Deh-e Malek, Gorgan County
- Now Deh-e Sharif, Gorgan County

== Hamadan Province ==
- Now Deh, Hamadan, a village in Hamadan County
- Now Deh, Razan, a village in Razan County

== Kermanshah Province ==
- Nowdeh, Kermanshah, a village in Sarpol-e Zahab County

== Kurdistan Province ==
- Nowdeh, Kurdistan, a village in Baneh County

== Lorestan Province ==
- Now Deh, Lorestan, Khorramabad County

== Markazi Province ==
- Nowdeh, Ashtian, Ashtian County
- Nowdeh, Farahan, Farahan County
- Now Deh, Khondab, Khondab County

== Mazandaran Province ==
- Now Deh, Amol, a village in Amol County
- Now Deh, Dabudasht, a village in Amol County
- Now Deh, Neka, a village in Neka County
- Now Deh, Nowshahr, a village in Nowshahr County
- Now Deh, Qaem Shahr, a village in Qaem Shahr County
- Now Deh, Sari, a village in Sari County
- Now Deh, Kolijan Rostaq, a village in Sari County

== North Khorasan Province ==
- Now Deh, North Khorasan, Bojnord County
- Qareh Now Deh, Bojnord County
- Now Deh Bam, Esfarayen County

== Qazvin Province ==
- Now Deh, Abyek, Abyek County
- Now Deh-e Lakvan, Buin Zahra County
- Now Deh, Buin Zahra, Buin Zahra County

== Razavi Khorasan Province ==
- Now Deh-e Gonabad, a village in Gonabad County
- Now Deh-e Meyrmaharab, a village in Gonabad County
- Now Deh-e Pashtak, a village in Gonabad County
- Now Deh-e Arbab, a village in Khoshab County
- Now Deh, Mashhad, a village in Mashhad County
- Now Deh, Sabzevar, a village in Sabzevar County
- Now Deh-e Sorsoreh, a village in Sabzevar County
- Now Deh, Torbat-e Heydarieh, a village in Torbat-e Heydarieh County
- Nowdeh, Torbat-e Jam, a village in Torbat-e Jam County

== Semnan Province ==
- Nowdeh-e Arbabi, a village in Garmsar County
- Nowdeh-e Khaleseh, a village in Garmsar County

== South Khorasan Province ==
- Now Deh, Birjand, a village in Birjand County
- Now Deh, Sarayan, a village in Sarayan County
- Nowdeh-e Olya, a village in Sarbisheh County
- Now Deh, Zirkuh, a village in Zirkuh County

== Tehran Province ==
- Now Deh, Damavand, Damavand County
- Now Deh, Robat Karim, Robat Karim County

== See also ==
- Deh Now (disambiguation)
