= Dehnow-e Bala =

Dehnow-e Bala or Deh Now-e Bala or Deh Now Bala or Deh Now-ye Bala or Deh-e Now Bala may refer to various places in Iran:

- Deh Now-ye Bala, Chaharmahal and Bakhtiari
- Deh Now-ye Bala, Lamerd, Fars Province
- Deh Now-e Bala, Rostam, Fars Province
- Dehnow-e Bala, Hamadan
- Dehnow-e Bala, Hormozgan
- Deh-e Now Bala, Rafsanjan, Kerman Province
- Deh Now-e Bala, Sirjan, Kerman Province
