= Cheleh =

Cheleh or Chelleh (Persian: چله) may refer to:

- Chelleh-ye Olya, Kermanshah Province
- Chelleh Darreh
- Cheleh Gah, Chaharmahal and Bakhtiari
- Cheleh Rural District, in Kermanshah Province
