= Kallar =

Kallar may refer to:

== Places ==
=== India ===
- Kallar, Kanhangad near Kanhangad, Kerala, India
- Kallar, Trivandrum in Trivandrum district in Kerala, India
- Kallar River, a tributary of the Neyyar river in India, flowing through Tamil Nadu and Kerala
- Kallar River (Pamba), a tributary of the Pamba river in India, flowing through Kerala

=== Iran ===
- Kallar-e Olya, a village in Chaharmahal and Bakhtiari Province, Iran
- Kallar-e Sofla, a village in Chaharmahal and Bakhtiari Province, Iran

=== Pakistan ===
- Kallar Temple, early 8th century temple in Punjab, Pakistan.

== Other uses ==
- Kallar (caste), a caste in Tamil Nadu

== See also ==
- Kalar (disambiguation)
- Kalla (disambiguation)
