= Dehnow, Khorramabad =

Dehnow, Khorramabad may refer to:

- Deh Now, Khorramabad, a village in Khorramabad County, Lorestan Province, Iran
- Dehnow, Dehpir, a village in Dehpir Rural District, Central District, Khorramabad County, Lorestan Province, Iran
- Deh-e Now, Qaedrahmat, a village in Qaedrahmat Rural District, Zagheh District, Khorramabad County, Lorestan Province, Iran
- Deh-e Now, Zagheh, a village in Zagheh Rural District, Zagheh District, Khorramabad County, Lorestan Province, Iran
