= Dehnow-e Pain =

Dehnow-e Pain or Deh-e Now-e Pain or Deh Now Pain or Deh Now-ye Pain (Persian: دهنوپائين) may refer to:

== Villages in Iran ==
- Deh-e Now-e Pain, Kiar
- Deh Now-ye Pain, Kuhrang
- Deh Now-e Pain, Fars
- Dehnow-e Pain, Hormozgan
- Dehnow-e Pain, Kerman
- Deh-e Now-e Pain, South Khorasan
