= Kalleh Mar =

Kalleh Mar or Kaleh Mar or Kallehmar (Persian: كله مار) may refer to:

- Kalleh Mar-e Olya
- Kalleh Mar-e Pain
