= Deh Now-e Sofla =

Deh Now-e Sofla or Deh-e Now-e Sofla or Deh Now-ye Sofla or Dehnow-e Sofla or Deh Now Sofla or Dehnow-ye Sofla (Persian: ده نوسفلي) may refer to:

- Deh Now-ye Sofla, Kiar, Chaharmahal and Bakhtiari Province
- Dehnow-ye Sofla, Kuhrang, Chaharmahal and Bakhtiari Province
- Deh Now-e Sofla, Hamadan
