= Deh Now-e Olya =

Deh Now-e Olya or Dehnow Olya or Deh Now-ye Olya or Dehnow-ye Olya or Dehnow-e Olya (Persian: دهنوعليا) may refer to:

- Deh Now-ye Olya, Kiar, Chaharmahal and Bakhtiari Province
- Dehnow-ye Olya, Kuhrang, Chaharmahal and Bakhtiari Province
- Deh Now-e Olya, Hamadan
