= Rud-e Hasan =

Rud-e Hasan or Rud Hasan (Persian: رودحسن) may refer to:

- Rud-e Hasan-e Olya
- Rud-e Hasan-e Sofla
