= Towhidabad =

Towhidabad (Persian: توحيداباد), also rendered as Tohidabad, may refer to:

- Towhidabad, Golestan
- Towhidabad, Kohgiluyeh and Boyer-Ahmad
- Towhidabad, Chabahar, Sistan and Baluchestan Province
- Towhidabad, Khash, Sistan and Baluchestan Province
- Towhidabad, Mirjaveh, Sistan and Baluchestan Province
- Towhidabad, Nosratabad, Sistan and Baluchestan Province
