= Allah Morad =

Allah Morad (Persian: اله مراد) may refer to:

- Allah Morad, Chaharmahal and Bakhtiari
- Allah Morad, Kermanshah
