= Michqavan =

Michqavan (Persian: ميچ قاان) may refer to:

- Michqavan-e Olya
- Michqavan-e Sofla
