= Dametir =

Dametir or Damatir (Persian: دم تير), also rendered as Damitar, may refer to:

- Dametir-e Jonubi
- Dametir-e Shomali
