= Kalar =

Kalar can refer to:

- Kalar, Iraq
- Kalar, Ardabil, Iran
- Kalar, Chaharmahal and Bakhtiari, Iran
- Kalwar (caste), Indian caste
- Kalar, a Burmese term for Burmese Indians
- Kalar Range, Transbaikalia, Russia
- Kalar (river), Transbaikalia, Russia
- Kalar, derogatory Burmese term for the Bengali and Rohingya people

== See also ==
- Kallar (disambiguation)
- Kalwar (disambiguation)
