= Sa'ban =

Sa'ban may refer to:

- Sa'ban language, an Apo Duat language spoken in Borneo.
- Sa'ban people, a sub-ethnic of the Dayak people from Borneo.
- Sa'ban, Iran, a village from Hamadan Province, Iran.
