= Kalwar =

Kalwar may refer to:

- Kalwar (caste), also Kalar and Kalal, a caste originating in India
- Kalwar, Madhya Pradesh, a village in the Indian state of Madhya Pradesh

== See also ==
- Kalar (disambiguation)
