= Kohyan =

Village in Chaharmahal and Bakhtiari province, Iran

Kohyan Persian: كهيان
- Village
- Location within Iran
- Coordinates: 31°27′26″N 50°56′39″E
- Country: Iran
- Province: Chaharmahal and Bakhtiari
- County: Lordegan
- District: Central
- Rural District: Rig

Population (2016)
  - Total: 2,015
- Time zone: UTC+3:30 (IRST)

Kohyan (Persian: كهيان) (Note: Also romanized as Kahīān, Kahiyan, Kahyān, and Kohyān) is a village in Rig Rural District of the Central District in Lordegan County, Chaharmahal and Bakhtiari province, Iran.

== Demographics ==
=== Population ===
At the time of the 2006 National Census, the village's population was 1,884 in 382 households. The following census in 2011 counted 1,908 people in 488 households. The 2016 census measured the population of the village as 2,015 people in 569 households.
