= Monjar Mui =

Village in Chaharmahal and Bakhtiari province, Iran

Monjar Mui Persian: منجرمويي
- Village
- Location within Iran
- Coordinates: 31°29′24″N 50°52′52″E
- Country: Iran
- Province: Chaharmahal and Bakhtiari
- County: Lordegan
- District: Central
- Rural District: Rig

Population (2016)
  - Total: 2,778
- Time zone: UTC+3:30 (IRST)

Monjar Mui (Persian: منجرمويي) (Note: Also romanized as Monjar Mū’ī; also known as Mūnjar Mū’ī) is a village in Rig Rural District of the Central District in Lordegan County, Chaharmahal and Bakhtiari province, Iran.

== Demographics ==
=== Population ===
At the time of the 2006 National Census, the village's population was 2,460 in 463 households. The following census in 2011 counted 2,671 people in 604 households. The 2016 census measured the population of the village as 2,778 people in 703 households. It was the most populous village in its rural district.
