= Michqavan-e Olya =

Michqavan-e Olya ميج قاان عليا
- Village
- Location within Iran
- Coordinates: 31°24′59″N 51°01′33″E
- Country: Iran
- Province: Chaharmahal and Bakhtiari
- County: Lordegan
- Bakhsh: Central
- Rural District: Rig

Population (2006)
  - Total: 107
- Time zone: UTC+3:30 (IRST)
  - Summer (DST): UTC+4:30 (IRDT)

Michqavan-e Olya (Persian: ميج قاان عليا, also Romanized as Mīchqāvān-e ‘Olyā) is a village in Rig Rural District, in the Central District of Lordegan County, Chaharmahal and Bakhtiari Province, Iran. At the 2006 census, its population was 107, in 27 families.
