= Dehnow-e Mohammad Qoli =

Dehnow-e Mohammad Qoli دهنومحمدقلي
- Village
- Location within Iran
- Coordinates: 31°22′52″N 51°03′37″E
- Country: Iran
- Province: Chaharmahal and Bakhtiari
- County: Lordegan
- Bakhsh: Central
- Rural District: Rig

Population (2006)
  - Total: 383
- Time zone: UTC+3:30 (IRST)
  - Summer (DST): UTC+4:30 (IRDT)

Dehnow-e Mohammad Qoli (Persian: دهنومحمدقلي, also Romanized as Dehnow-e Moḩammad Qolī; also known as Dehnow-e Ḩājmoḩammadqolī) is a village in Rig Rural District, in the Central District of Lordegan County, Chaharmahal and Bakhtiari Province, Iran. At the 2006 census, its population was 383, in 81 families.
