= Michqavan-e Sofla =

Michqavan-e Sofla ميچ قاان سفلي
- Village
- Location within Iran
- Coordinates: 31°25′19″N 51°01′14″E
- Country: Iran
- Province: Chaharmahal and Bakhtiari
- County: Lordegan
- Bakhsh: Central
- Rural District: Rig

Population (2006)
  - Total: 148
- Time zone: UTC+3:30 (IRST)
  - Summer (DST): UTC+4:30 (IRDT)

Michqavan-e Sofla (Persian: ميچ قاان سفلي, also Romanized as Mīchqāvān-e Soflá) is a village in Rig Rural District, in the Central District of Lordegan County, Chaharmahal and Bakhtiari Province, Iran. At the 2006 census, its population was 148, in 31 families.
