= Chenar-e Mahmudi =

Village in Chaharmahal and Bakhtiari province, Iran

Chenar-e Mahmudi Persian: چنارمحمودي
- Village
- Location within Iran
- Coordinates: 31°24′09″N 51°07′06″E
- Country: Iran
- Province: Chaharmahal and Bakhtiari
- County: Lordegan
- District: Central
- Rural District: Rig

Population (2016)
  - Total: 1,498
- Time zone: UTC+3:30 (IRST)

Chenar-e Mahmudi (Persian: چنارمحمودي) (Note: Also romanized as Chenār-e Maḩmūdī; also known as Chenār and Deh Chenār-e Maḩmūdī) is a village in Rig Rural District of the Central District in Lordegan County, Chaharmahal and Bakhtiari province, Iran.

== Demographics ==
=== Ethnicity ===
The village is populated by Lurs.

=== Population ===
At the time of the 2006 National Census, the village's population was 1,329 in 263 households. The following census in 2011 counted 1,708 people in 394 households. The 2016 census measured the population of the village as 1,498 people in 415 households.
