= Duleh Sib =

Village in Chaharmahal and Bakhtiari province, Iran

Duleh Sib Persian: دوله سيب
- Village
- Location within Iran
- Coordinates: 31°23′28″N 51°01′41″E
- Country: Iran
- Province: Chaharmahal and Bakhtiari
- County: Lordegan
- District: Central
- Rural District: Rig

Population (2016)
  - Total: 674
- Time zone: UTC+3:30 (IRST)

Duleh Sib (Persian: دوله سيب) (Note: Also romanized as Dūleh Sīb; also known as Dūleh Sīb-e Rīg) is a village in Rig Rural District of the Central District in Lordegan County, Chaharmahal and Bakhtiari province, Iran.

== Demographics ==
=== Population ===
At the time of the 2006 National Census, the village's population was 776 in 142 households. The following census in 2011 counted 585 people in 121 households. The 2016 census measured the population of the village as 674 people in 185 households.
