= Baba Rostam, Hamadan =

Village in Hamadan province, Iran

Baba Rostam Persian: بابارستم
- Village
- Location within Iran
- Coordinates: 34°08′50″N 48°22′37″E
- Country: Iran
- Province: Hamadan
- County: Nahavand
- District: Central
- Rural District: Shaban

Population (2016)
  - Total: 1,099
- Time zone: UTC+3:30 (IRST)

Baba Rostam (Persian: بابارستم) (Note: Also romanized as Bābā Rostam) is a village in Shaban Rural District of the Central District in Nahavand County, Hamadan province, Iran.

== Demographics ==
=== Population ===
At the time of the 2006 National Census, the village's population was 1,137 in 300 households. The following census in 2011 counted 1,128 people in 342 households. The 2016 census measured the population of the village as 1,099 people in 336 households.
