= Tekkeh, Hamadan =

Village in Hamadan province, Iran

Tekkeh Persian: تكه
- Village
- Location within Iran
- Coordinates: 34°07′19″N 48°23′17″E
- Country: Iran
- Province: Hamadan
- County: Nahavand
- District: Central
- Rural District: Shaban

Population (2016)
  - Total: 754
- Time zone: UTC+3:30 (IRST)

Tekkeh (Persian: تكه) (Note: Also romanized as Tekeh and Tokeh) is a village in Shaban Rural District of the Central District in Nahavand County, Hamadan province, Iran.

== Demographics ==
=== Population ===
At the time of the 2006 National Census, the village's population was 674 in 175 households. The following census in 2011 counted 727 people in 234 households. The 2016 census measured the population of the village as 754 people in 221 households.
