= Dehnow-e Shams Ali =

Dehnow-e Shams Ali دهنوشمسعلي
- Village
- Location within Iran
- Coordinates: 31°23′07″N 51°03′30″E
- Country: Iran
- Province: Chaharmahal and Bakhtiari
- County: Lordegan
- Bakhsh: Central
- Rural District: Rig

Population (2006)
  - Total: 130
- Time zone: UTC+3:30 (IRST)
  - Summer (DST): UTC+4:30 (IRDT)

Dehnow-e Shams Ali (Persian: دهنوشمسعلي, also Romanized as Dehnow-e Shams ʿAlī; also known as Dehnow-e Shamsalī) is a village in Rig Rural District, in the Central District of Lordegan County, Chaharmahal and Bakhtiari Province, Iran. At the 2006 census, its population was 130, in 24 families.
