= Kuhani =

Village in Hamadan province, Iran

Kuhani Persian: كوهاني
- Village
- Location within Iran
- Coordinates: 34°09′16″N 48°24′23″E
- Country: Iran
- Province: Hamadan
- County: Nahavand
- District: Central
- Rural District: Shaban

Population (2016)
  - Total: 2,674
- Time zone: UTC+3:30 (IRST)

Kuhani (Persian: كوهاني) (Note: Also romanized as Kūhānī; also known as Kohni and Kuhni) is a village in, and the capital of, Shaban Rural District in the Central District of Nahavand County, Hamadan province, Iran.

== Demographics ==
=== Population ===
At the time of the 2006 National Census, the village's population was 2,528 in 687 households. The following census in 2011 counted 2,664 people in 788 households. The 2016 census measured the population of the village as 2,674 people in 838 households, the most populous in its rural district.
