= Kallar-e Sofla =

Kallar-e Sofla كلارسفلي
- Village
- Location within Iran
- Coordinates: 31°24′29″N 51°02′41″E
- Country: Iran
- Province: Chaharmahal and Bakhtiari
- County: Lordegan
- Bakhsh: Central
- Rural District: Rig

Population (2006)
  - Total: 214
- Time zone: UTC+3:30 (IRST)
  - Summer (DST): UTC+4:30 (IRDT)

Kallar-e Sofla (Persian: كلارسفلي, also Romanized as Kallār-e Soflá; also known as Kallār-e Bāz‘alī and Kallār-e Pā’īn) is a village in Rig Rural District, in the Central District of Lordegan County, Chaharmahal and Bakhtiari Province, Iran. At the 2006 census, its population was 214, in 43 families.
