= Fiazaman =

Village in Hamadan province, Iran

Fiazaman Persian: فيازمان
- Village
- Location within Iran
- Coordinates: 34°07′52″N 48°23′47″E
- Country: Iran
- Province: Hamadan
- County: Nahavand
- District: Central
- Rural District: Shaban

Population (2016)
  - Total: 1,032
- Time zone: UTC+3:30 (IRST)

Fiazaman (Persian: فيازمان) (Note: Also romanized as Feyāzamān, Feyāzmān, Fīāzamān, and Fīāzmān; also known as Paizamān, Pā-ye Zamān, and Qobāzmān) is a village in Shaban Rural District of the Central District in Nahavand County, Hamadan province, Iran.

== Demographics ==
=== Population ===
At the time of the 2006 National Census, the village's population was 990 in 246 households. The following census in 2011 counted 1,091 people in 294 households. The 2016 census measured the population of the village as 1,032 people in 282 households.
