= Dehnow-e Gudarz =

Dehnow-e Gudarz دهنوگودرز
- Village
- Location within Iran
- Coordinates: 31°22′36″N 51°03′43″E
- Country: Iran
- Province: Chaharmahal and Bakhtiari
- County: Lordegan
- Bakhsh: Central
- Rural District: Rig

Population (2006)
  - Total: 200
- Time zone: UTC+3:30 (IRST)
  - Summer (DST): UTC+4:30 (IRDT)

Dehnow-e Gudarz (Persian: دهنوگودرز, also Romanized as Dehnow-e Gūdarz and Dehnow-ye Gūdarz) is a village in Rig Rural District, in the Central District of Lordegan County, Chaharmahal and Bakhtiari Province, Iran. At the 2006 census, its population was 200, in 46 families.
