= Chaman Bid, Chaharmahal and Bakhtiari =

Village in Chaharmahal and Bakhtiari province, Iran

Chaman Bid Persian: چمن بيد
- Village
- Location within Iran
- Coordinates: 31°24′01″N 51°00′42″E
- Country: Iran
- Province: Chaharmahal and Bakhtiari
- County: Lordegan
- District: Central
- Rural District: Rig

Population (2016)
  - Total: 676
- Time zone: UTC+3:30 (IRST)

Chaman Bid (Persian: چمن بيد) (Note: Also romanized as Chaman Bīd; also known as Chaman Bīd-e Rīg) is a village in Rig Rural District of the Central District in Lordegan County, Chaharmahal and Bakhtiari province, Iran.

== Demographics ==
=== Population ===
At the time of the 2006 National Census, the village's population was 653 in 127 households. The following census in 2011 counted 713 people in 161 households. The 2016 census measured the population of the village as 676 people in 178 households.
