= Suki-ye Olya =

Suki-ye Olya سوکي عليا
- Village
- Location within Iran
- Coordinates: 33°37′29″N 48°38′42″E
- Country: Iran
- Province: Lorestan
- County: Khorramabad
- Bakhsh: Bayravand
- Rural District: Beyranvand-e Jonubi

Population (2006)
  - Total: 80
- Time zone: UTC+3:30 (IRST)
  - Summer (DST): UTC+4:30 (IRDT)

Suki-ye Olya (Persian: سوکي عليا, also Romanized as Sūkī-ye ‘Olyā; also known as Deh Now-ye Sūkī-ye ‘Olyā) is a village in Beyranvand-e Jonubi Rural District, Bayravand District, Khorramabad County, Lorestan Province, Iran. At the 2006 census, its population was 80, in 14 families.
