= Deh Now, Alamarvdasht =

Deh Now ده نو
- village
- Location within Iran
- Coordinates: 27°35′45″N 53°03′03″E
- Country: Iran
- Province: Fars
- County: Lamerd
- Bakhsh: Alamarvdasht
- Rural District: Alamarvdasht

Population (2016)
  - Total: 1,271
- Time zone: UTC+3:30 (IRST)
  - Summer (DST): UTC+4:30 (IRDT)

Deh Now (Persian: ده نو; also known as Dehnow 'Alām Rūdasht and Dehnow Allam Roodasht) is a village in Alamarvdasht Rural District, Alamarvdasht District, Lamerd County, Fars province, Iran. At the 2016 census, its population was 1271 in 351

13

200 families.
