= Rud-e Hasan-e Olya =

Rud-e Hasan-e Olya رودحسن عليا
- Village
- Location within Iran
- Coordinates: 34°06′45″N 48°21′20″E
- Country: Iran
- Province: Hamadan
- County: Nahavand
- Bakhsh: Central
- Rural District: Shaban

Population (2006)
  - Total: 389
- Time zone: UTC+3:30 (IRST)
  - Summer (DST): UTC+4:30 (IRDT)

Rud-e Hasan-e Olya (Persian: رودحسن عليا, also Romanized as Rūd-e Ḩasan-e ‘Olyā and Rūd Ḩasan-e ‘Olyā; also known as Kaleh Mar Olya, Kalleh Mār, Kallehmār-e Bālā, and Kalleh Mār-e ‘Olyā) is a village in Shaban Rural District, in the Central District of Nahavand County, Hamadan Province, Iran. At the 2006 census, its population was 389, in 104 families.
