= Dehnow Qalandari =

Dehnow Qalandari دهنوقلندري
- Village
- Location within Iran
- Coordinates: 29°42′14″N 52°11′43″E
- Country: Iran
- Province: Fars
- County: Shiraz
- Bakhsh: Arzhan
- Rural District: Qarah Chaman

Population (2006)
  - Total: 977
- Time zone: UTC+3:30 (IRST)
  - Summer (DST): UTC+4:30 (IRDT)

Dehnow Qalandari (Persian: دهنوقلندري, also romanized as Dehnow Qalandarī; also known as Deh Now) is a village in Qarah Chaman Rural District, Arzhan District, Shiraz County, Fars province, Iran. At the 2006 census, its population was 977, in 212 families.
