= Dehnow-e Kasurak =

Dehnow-e Kasurak دهنوكسورك
- Village
- Location within Iran
- Coordinates: 28°20′25″N 58°41′34″E
- Country: Iran
- Province: Kerman
- County: Rigan
- Bakhsh: Central
- Rural District: Gavkan

Population (2006)
  - Total: 171
- Time zone: UTC+3:30 (IRST)
  - Summer (DST): UTC+4:30 (IRDT)

Dehnow-e Kasurak (Persian: دهنوكسورك, also Romanized as Dehnow-e Kasūrak) is a village in Gavkan Rural District, in the Central District of Rigan County, Kerman Province, Iran. At the 2006 census, its population was 171, in 40 families.
