= Deh Now-e Kukhdan =

Deh Now-e Kukhdan دهنوكوخدان
- Village
- Location within Iran
- Coordinates: 30°50′24″N 51°29′46″E
- Country: Iran
- Province: Kohgiluyeh and Boyer-Ahmad
- County: Dana
- Bakhsh: Central
- Rural District: Dana

Population (2006)
  - Total: 145
- Time zone: UTC+3:30 (IRST)
  - Summer (DST): UTC+4:30 (IRDT)

Deh Now-e Kukhdan (Persian: دهنوكوخدان, also Romanized as Deh Now-e Kūkhdān; also known as Deh Now) is a village in Dana Rural District, in the Central District of Dana County, Kohgiluyeh and Boyer-Ahmad Province, Iran. At the 2006 census, its population was 145, in 29 families.
