= Dehnow-e Bushkan =

Dehnow-e Bushkan دهنوبوشكان
- Village
- Location within Iran
- Coordinates: 29°42′46″N 51°30′16″E
- Country: Iran
- Province: Fars
- County: Kazerun
- Bakhsh: Central
- Rural District: Deris

Population (2006)
  - Total: 686
- Time zone: UTC+3:30 (IRST)
  - Summer (DST): UTC+4:30 (IRDT)

Dehnow-e Bushkan (Persian: دهنوبوشكان, also Romanized as Dehnow-e Būshkān; also known as Dehnow-e Bushigan) is a village in Deris Rural District, in the Central District of Kazerun County, Fars province, Iran. At the 2006 census, its population was 686, in 133 families.
