= Dehnow, Sonqor =

Dehnow ده نو
- Village
- Location within Iran
- Coordinates: 34°49′04″N 47°46′57″E
- Country: Iran
- Province: Kermanshah
- County: Sonqor
- Bakhsh: Central
- Rural District: Ab Barik

Population (2006)
  - Total: 217
- Time zone: UTC+3:30 (IRST)
  - Summer (DST): UTC+4:30 (IRDT)

Dehnow (Persian: ده نو) is a village in Ab Barik Rural District, in the Central District of Sonqor County, Kermanshah Province, Iran. At the 2006 census, its population was 217, in 46 families.
