= Dametir-e Jonubi =

Dametir-e Jonubi دم تير جنوبي
- Village
- Location within Iran
- Coordinates: 27°07′18″N 53°18′51″E
- Country: Iran
- Province: Hormozgan
- County: Parsian
- Bakhsh: Central
- Rural District: Mehregan

Population (2006)
  - Total: 351
- Time zone: UTC+3:30 (IRST)
  - Summer (DST): UTC+4:30 (IRDT)

Dametir-e Jonubi (Persian: دم تير جنوبي, also Romanized as Dametīr-e Jonūbī) is a village in Mehregan Rural District, in the Central District of Parsian County, Hormozgan Province, Iran. At the 2006 census, its population was 351, in 75 families.
