= Now Deh, Shaft =

Now Deh نوده
- Village
- Location within Iran
- Coordinates: 37°14′44″N 49°26′57″E
- Country: Iran
- Province: Gilan
- County: Shaft
- Bakhsh: Central
- Rural District: Molla Sara

Population (2006)
  - Total: 276
- Time zone: UTC+3:30 (IRST)
  - Summer (DST): UTC+4:30 (IRDT)

Now Deh (Persian: نوده; also known as Now Deh-e Markhāl) is a village in Molla Sara Rural District, in the Central District of Shaft County, Gilan Province, Iran. At the 2006 census, its population was 276, in 77 families.
