= Deh-e Now-e Jameh =

Deh-e Now-e Jameh دهنوجمعه
- Village
- Location within Iran
- Coordinates: 30°40′30″N 54°51′14″E
- Country: Iran
- Province: Kerman
- County: Shahr-e Babak
- Bakhsh: Dehaj
- Rural District: Dehaj

Population (2006)
  - Total: 183
- Time zone: UTC+3:30 (IRST)
  - Summer (DST): UTC+4:30 (IRDT)

Deh-e Now-e Jameh (Persian: دهنوجمعه, also Romanized as Deh-e Now-e Jamʿeh; also known as Deh-e Now) is a village in Dehaj Rural District, Dehaj District, Shahr-e Babak County, Kerman Province, Iran. At the 2006 census, its population was 183, in 26 families.
