= Deh Now, Rayen =

Deh Now دهنو
- Village
- Location within Iran
- Coordinates: 29°21′36″N 57°31′26″E
- Country: Iran
- Province: Kerman
- County: Kerman
- Bakhsh: Rayen
- Rural District: Hoseynabad-e Goruh

Population (2006)
  - Total: 13
- Time zone: UTC+3:30 (IRST)
  - Summer (DST): UTC+4:30 (IRDT)

Deh Now (Persian: دهنو, also Romanized as Deh-e Now and Deh-i-Nau) is a village in Hoseynabad-e Goruh Rural District, Rayen District, Kerman County, Kerman Province, Iran. At the 2006 census, its population was 13, in 4 families.
