= Dehnow, Eqlid =

Dehnow دهنو
- Village
- Location within Iran
- Coordinates: 30°37′08″N 52°18′51″E
- Country: Iran
- Province: Fars
- County: Eqlid
- Bakhsh: Sedeh
- Rural District: Aspas

Population (2006)
  - Total: 141
- Time zone: UTC+3:30 (IRST)
  - Summer (DST): UTC+4:30 (IRDT)

Dehnow (Persian: دهنو) is a village in Aspas Rural District, Sedeh District, Eqlid County, Fars province, Iran. At the 2006 census, its population was 141, in 32 families.
