= Deh Now, Bam =

Deh Now دهنو
- Village
- Location within Iran
- Coordinates: 28°57′47″N 57°54′07″E
- Country: Iran
- Province: Kerman
- County: Bam
- Bakhsh: Central
- Rural District: Howmeh

Population (2006)
  - Total: 31
- Time zone: UTC+3:30 (IRST)
  - Summer (DST): UTC+4:30 (IRDT)

Deh Now (Persian: دهنو, also Romanized as Deh-e Now) is a village in Howmeh Rural District, in the Central District of Bam County, Kerman Province, Iran. At the 2006 census, its population was 31, in 10 families.
