= Now Deh, Amol =

Now Deh نوده
- Village
- Location within Iran
- Coordinates: 36°31′00″N 52°22′04″E
- Country: Iran
- Province: Mazandaran
- County: Amol
- Bakhsh: Central
- Rural District: Harazpey-ye Jonubi

Population (2006)
  - Total: 285
- Time zone: UTC+3:30 (IRST)
  - Summer (DST): UTC+4:30 (IRDT)

Now Deh (Persian: نوده; also known as Now Deh-e Harāzpey) is a village in Harazpey-ye Jonubi Rural District, in the Central District of Amol County, Mazandaran Province, Iran. At the 2006 census, its population was 285, in 67 families.
