= Deh Now-e Derakhti =

Deh Now-e Derakhti ده نودرختي
- Village
- Location within Iran
- Coordinates: 28°58′54″N 58°37′22″E
- Country: Iran
- Province: Kerman
- County: Narmashir
- Bakhsh: Central
- Rural District: Posht Rud

Population (2006)
  - Total: 79
- Time zone: UTC+3:30 (IRST)
  - Summer (DST): UTC+4:30 (IRDT)

Deh Now-e Derakhti (Persian: ده نودرختي, also Romanized as Deh Now-e Derakhtī and Deh Now Derakhtī; also known as Deh Now and Deh Now-e Vakīlābād) is a village in Posht Rud Rural District, in the Central District of Narmashir County, Kerman Province, Iran. At the 2006 census, its population was 79, in 15 families.
