= Deh Now-e Allah Morad =

Deh Now-e Allah Morad دهنواله مراد
- Village
- Location within Iran
- Coordinates: 31°22′47″N 51°03′17″E
- Country: Iran
- Province: Chaharmahal and Bakhtiari
- County: Lordegan
- Bakhsh: Central
- Rural District: Rig

Population (2006)
  - Total: 263
- Time zone: UTC+3:30 (IRST)
  - Summer (DST): UTC+4:30 (IRDT)

Deh Now-e Allah Morad (Persian: دهنواله مراد, also Romanized as Deh Now-e Allāh Morād; also known as Allāh Morād) is a village in Rig Rural District, in the Central District of Lordegan County, Chaharmahal and Bakhtiari Province, Iran. At the 2006 census, its population was 263, in 50 families.
