= Deh Now-e Lakzi =

Deh Now-e Lakzi دهنولکزی
- Village
- Location within Iran
- Coordinates: 36°09′33″N 58°49′05″E
- Country: Iran
- Province: Razavi Khorasan
- County: Nishapur
- Bakhsh: Central
- Rural District: Darbqazi

Population (2006)
  - Total: 184
- Time zone: UTC+3:30 (IRST)
  - Summer (DST): UTC+4:30 (IRDT)

Deh Now-e Lakzi (Persian: دهنولکزی, also Romanized as Deh Now-e Lakzī; also known as Deh Now-ye Lagzī, Deh-i-Nau, Dehnow, Deh Now-e Lagzī, and Dehnow-e Lagzī) is a village in Darbqazi Rural District, in the Central District of Nishapur County, Razavi Khorasan Province, Iran. At the 2006 census, its population was 184, in 49 families.
