= Deh Now, Hajjiabad =

Deh Now دهنو
- Village
- Location within Iran
- Coordinates: 28°27′30″N 55°31′05″E
- Country: Iran
- Province: Hormozgan
- County: Hajjiabad
- Bakhsh: Central
- Rural District: Dar Agah

Population (2006)
  - Total: 262
- Time zone: UTC+3:30 (IRST)
  - Summer (DST): UTC+4:30 (IRDT)

Deh Now (Persian: دهنو, also Romanized as Deh-e Now and Deh Nau; also known as Deh-e Nāb, Dehnow Daragah, and Dehnow-e Darāgāh) is a village in Dar Agah Rural District, in the Central District of Hajjiabad County, Hormozgan Province, Iran. At the 2006 census, its population was 262, in 59 families.
