= Deh Now-e Sarab =

Deh Now-e Sarab دهنوسراب
- Village
- Location within Iran
- Coordinates: 27°46′13″N 57°09′48″E
- Country: Iran
- Province: Hormozgan
- County: Rudan
- Bakhsh: Central
- Rural District: Rahdar

Population (2006)
  - Total: 96
- Time zone: UTC+3:30 (IRST)
  - Summer (DST): UTC+4:30 (IRDT)

Deh Now-e Sarab (Persian: دهنوسراب, also Romanized as Deh Now-e Sarāb; also known as Deh Now) is a village in Rahdar Rural District, in the Central District of Rudan County, Hormozgan Province, Iran. At the 2006 census, its population was 96, in 21 families.
