= Deh Now-e Allah Verdi =

Deh Now-e Allah Verdi دهنواله وردي
- Village
- Location within Iran
- Coordinates: 28°25′25″N 57°50′18″E
- Country: Iran
- Province: Kerman
- County: Anbarabad
- Bakhsh: Central
- Rural District: Aliabad

Population (2006)
  - Total: 671
- Time zone: UTC+3:30 (IRST)
  - Summer (DST): UTC+4:30 (IRDT)

Deh Now-e Allah Verdi (Persian: دهنواله وردي, also Romanized as Dehnow-e Āllah Verdī; also known as Dehno) is a village in Aliabad Rural District, in the Central District of Anbarabad County, Kerman province, Iran. At the 2006 census, its population was 671, in 152 families.
