= Deh Now-e Jahangir Khan =

Deh Now-e Jahangir Khan دهنوجهانگيرخان
- Village
- Location within Iran
- Coordinates: 30°29′58″N 56°01′02″E
- Country: Iran
- Province: Kerman
- County: Rafsanjan
- Bakhsh: Central
- Rural District: Azadegan

Population (2006)
  - Total: 45
- Time zone: UTC+3:30 (IRST)
  - Summer (DST): UTC+4:30 (IRDT)

Deh Now-e Jahangir Khan (Persian: دهنوجهانگيرخان, also Romanized as Deh Now-e Jahāngīr Khān; also known as Deh Now and Deh Now-e Feyẕābād) is a village in Azadegan Rural District, in the Central District of Rafsanjan County, Kerman Province, Iran. At the 2006 census, its population was 45, in 11 families.
