= Deh Now-e Yarahmadi =

Deh Now-e Yarahmadi ده نوياراحمدي
- Village
- Location within Iran
- Coordinates: 27°51′27″N 58°00′06″E
- Country: Iran
- Province: Kerman
- County: Rudbar-e Jonubi
- Bakhsh: Central
- Rural District: Nehzatabad

Population (2006)
  - Total: 183
- Time zone: UTC+3:30 (IRST)
  - Summer (DST): UTC+4:30 (IRDT)

Deh Now-e Yarahmadi (Persian: ده نوياراحمدي, also Romanized as Deh Now-e Yāraḩmadī, Deh-e Now-e Yār Aḩmadī, Dehnow-e Yār Aḩmadī, and Deh Now-e Yār Aḩmadī; also known as Deh-e Now) is a village in Nehzatabad Rural District, in the Central District of Rudbar-e Jonubi County, Kerman Province, Iran. At the 2006 census, its population was 183, in 34 families.
