= Now Deh, Khondab =

Now Deh نوده
- Village
- Location within Iran
- Coordinates: 34°15′45″N 49°24′39″E
- Country: Iran
- Province: Markazi
- County: Khondab
- Bakhsh: Qareh Chay
- Rural District: Javersiyan

Population (2006)
  - Total: 637
- Time zone: UTC+3:30 (IRST)
  - Summer (DST): UTC+4:30 (IRDT)

Now Deh (Persian: نوده) is a village in Javersiyan Rural District, Qareh Chay District, Khondab County, Markazi Province, Iran. At the 2006 census, its population was 637, in 149 families.
