= Deh Now-e Nowdezh =

Deh Now-e Nowdezh دهنه نودژ
- Village
- Location within Iran
- Coordinates: 27°24′57″N 57°32′15″E
- Country: Iran
- Province: Kerman
- County: Manujan
- Bakhsh: Aseminun
- Rural District: Nowdezh

Population (2006)
  - Total: 297
- Time zone: UTC+3:30 (IRST)
  - Summer (DST): UTC+4:30 (IRDT)

Deh Now-e Nowdezh (Persian: دهنه نودژ; also known as Deh Now) is a village in Nowdezh Rural District, Aseminun District, Manujan County, Kerman Province, Iran. At the 2006 census, its population was 297, in 66 families.
