= Mahmudiyeh, Rafsanjan =

Mahmudiyeh محموديه
- Village
- Location within Iran
- Coordinates: 30°26′51″N 55°51′23″E
- Country: Iran
- Province: Kerman
- County: Rafsanjan
- Bakhsh: Central
- Rural District: Razmavaran

Population (2006)
  - Total: 22
- Time zone: UTC+3:30 (IRST)
  - Summer (DST): UTC+4:30 (IRDT)

Mahmudiyeh (Persian: محموديه, also Romanized as Maḩmūdīyeh; also known as Deh Now and Mahmoodiyeh) is a village in Razmavaran Rural District, in the Central District of Rafsanjan County, Kerman Province, Iran. At the 2006 census, its population was 22, in 5 families.
