= Deh Now, Afghanistan =

Deh Now
- Location in Afghanistan
- Coordinates: 37°1′40″N 66°44′54″E
- Country: Afghanistan
- Province: Balkh Province
- Time zone: + 4.30

Deh Now is a village in Balkh Province in northern Afghanistan.

== See also ==
- Balkh Province
