= Deh Now-e Shurab =

Deh Now-e Shurab دهنوشوراب
- Village
- Location within Iran
- Coordinates: 29°15′36″N 52°19′02″E
- Country: Iran
- Province: Fars
- County: Shiraz
- Bakhsh: Central
- Rural District: Siyakh Darengun

Population (2006)
  - Total: 90
- Time zone: UTC+3:30 (IRST)
  - Summer (DST): UTC+4:30 (IRDT)

Deh Now-e Shurab (Persian: دهنوشوراب, also Romanized as Deh Now-e Shūrāb; also known as Deh Now) is a village in Siyakh Darengun Rural District, in the Central District of Shiraz County, Fars province, Iran. At the 2006 census, its population was 90, in 19 families.
