= Deh Now-e Khonj =

Deh Now-e Khonj دهنوخنج
- Village
- Location within Iran
- Coordinates: 27°54′44″N 53°31′37″E
- Country: Iran
- Province: Fars
- County: Khonj
- Bakhsh: Central
- Rural District: Tang-e Narak

Population (2006)
  - Total: 250
- Time zone: UTC+3:30 (IRST)
  - Summer (DST): UTC+4:30 (IRDT)

Deh Now-e Khonj (Persian: دهنوخنج, also Romanized as Deh Now-ye Khonj; also known as Deh Now, Deh Now-e Konj, and Dehnow Khanj) is a village in Tang-e Narak Rural District, in the Central District of Khonj County, Fars province, Iran. At the 2006 census, its population was 250, in 38 families.
