= Deh Now-e Esahaqabad =

Deh Now-e Esahaqabad دهنواسحاق اباد
- Village
- Location within Iran
- Coordinates: 28°58′47″N 58°38′02″E
- Country: Iran
- Province: Kerman
- County: Narmashir
- Bakhsh: Central
- Rural District: Posht Rud

Population (2006)
  - Total: 186
- Time zone: UTC+3:30 (IRST)
  - Summer (DST): UTC+4:30 (IRDT)

Deh Now-e Esahaqabad (Persian: دهنواسحاق اباد, also Romanized as Deh Now-e Esaḥāqābād; also known as Deh-e Now and Deh Now) is a village in Posht Rud Rural District, in the Central District of Narmashir County, Kerman Province, Iran. At the 2006 census, its population was 186, in 50 families.
