= Cheleh Gah, Chaharmahal and Bakhtiari =

Village in Chaharmahal and Bakhtiari province, Iran

Cheleh Gah Persian: چله گاه
- Village
- Location within Iran
- Coordinates: 31°26′08″N 50°59′44″E
- Country: Iran
- Province: Chaharmahal and Bakhtiari
- County: Lordegan
- District: Central
- Rural District: Rig

Population (2016)
  - Total: 1,076
- Time zone: UTC+3:30 (IRST)

Cheleh Gah (Persian: چله گاه) (Note: Also romanized as Cheleh Gāh and Chelleh Gah) is a village in Rig Rural District of the Central District in Lordegan County, Chaharmahal and Bakhtiari province, Iran.

== Demographics ==
=== Population ===
At the time of the 2006 National Census, the village's population was 1,228 in 210 households. The following census in 2011 counted 1,269 people in 266 households. The 2016 census measured the population of the village as 1,076 people in 274 households.
