= Golin Allah Morad =

Golin Allah Morad گلين اله مراد
- Village
- Location within Iran
- Coordinates: 34°16′04″N 45°56′49″E
- Country: Iran
- Province: Kermanshah
- County: Gilan-e Gharb
- Bakhsh: Central
- Rural District: Direh

Population (2006)
  - Total: 121
- Time zone: UTC+3:30 (IRST)
  - Summer (DST): UTC+4:30 (IRDT)

Golin Allah Morad (Persian: گلين اله مراد, also Romanized as Golīn Allāh Morād; also known as Allāh Morād and Allāh Morād-e Golīn) is a village in Direh Rural District, in the Central District of Gilan-e Gharb County, Kermanshah Province, Iran. At the 2006 census, its population was 121, in 28 families.
