= Dehnow-e Yasuj =

Dehnow-e Yasuj دهنوياسوج
- Village
- Location within Iran
- Coordinates: 30°38′01″N 51°38′12″E
- Country: Iran
- Province: Kohgiluyeh and Boyer-Ahmad
- County: Boyer-Ahmad
- Bakhsh: Central
- Rural District: Sarrud-e Shomali

Population (2006)
  - Total: 223
- Time zone: UTC+3:30 (IRST)
  - Summer (DST): UTC+4:30 (IRDT)

Dehnow-e Yasuj (Persian: دهنوياسوج, also Romanized as Dehnow-e Yāsūj; also known as Deh-e Now, Dehnow, and Deh Now) is a village in Sarrud-e Shomali Rural District, in the Central District of Boyer-Ahmad County, Kohgiluyeh and Boyer-Ahmad Province, Iran. At the 2006 census, its population was 223, in 48 families.
