= Dehnow-e Chamran =

Dehnow-e Chamran دهنوچمران
- Village
- Country: Iran
- Province: Fars
- County: Kazerun
- Bakhsh: Central
- Rural District: Shapur

Population (2006)
  - Total: 406
- Time zone: UTC+3:30 (IRST)
  - Summer (DST): UTC+4:30 (IRDT)

Dehnow-e Chamran (Persian: دهنوچمران, also Romanized as Dehnow-e Chamrān) is a village in Shapur Rural District, in the Central District of Kazerun County, Fars province, Iran. At the 2006 census, its population was 406, in 96 families.
