= Dehnow, Ardal =

Dehnow ده نو
- Village
- Location within Iran
- Coordinates: 31°42′45″N 50°35′23″E
- Country: Iran
- Province: Chaharmahal and Bakhtiari
- County: Ardal
- Bakhsh: Miankuh
- Rural District: Miankuh

Population (2006)
  - Total: 132
- Time zone: UTC+3:30 (IRST)
  - Summer (DST): UTC+4:30 (IRDT)

Dehnow (Persian: ده نو, also Romanized as Deh-e Now) is a village in Miankuh Rural District, Miankuh District, Ardal County, Chaharmahal and Bakhtiari Province, Iran. At the 2006 census, its population was 132, in 27 families.
