= Dehnow-e Shahsavar Khan =

Dehnow-e Shahsavar Khan دهنوشهسوارخان
- Village
- Location within Iran
- Coordinates: 28°23′19″N 57°45′59″E
- Country: Iran
- Province: Kerman
- County: Anbarabad
- Bakhsh: Esmaili
- Rural District: Hoseynabad

Population (2006)
  - Total: 1,555
- Time zone: UTC+3:30 (IRST)
  - Summer (DST): UTC+4:30 (IRDT)

Dehnow-e Shahsavar Khan (Persian: دهنوشهسوارخان, also Romanized as Dehnow-e Shahsavār Khān; also known as Deh-i-Nau, Dehnow, and Dehnow-e Shahsavārī) is a village in Hoseynabad Rural District, Esmaili District, Anbarabad County, Kerman Province, Iran. At the 2006 census, its population was 1,555, in 287 families.
