= Deh Now, Kangavar =

Deh Now ده نو
- Village
- Location within Iran
- Coordinates: 34°31′17″N 47°48′36″E
- Country: Iran
- Province: Kermanshah
- County: Kangavar
- Bakhsh: Central
- Rural District: Qazvineh

Population (2006)
  - Total: 163
- Time zone: UTC+3:30 (IRST)
  - Summer (DST): UTC+4:30 (IRDT)

Deh Now (Persian: ده نو, also Romanized as Dehnow) is a village in Qazvineh Rural District, in the Central District of Kangavar County, Kermanshah Province, Iran. At the 2006 census, its population was 163, in 47 families.
