= Dehnow-e Sarfaryab =

Dehnow-e Sarfaryab دهنوسرفارياب
- Village
- Location within Iran
- Coordinates: 30°46′37″N 50°51′35″E
- Country: Iran
- Province: Kohgiluyeh and Boyer-Ahmad
- County: Charam
- Bakhsh: Sarfaryab
- Rural District: Sarfaryab

Population (2006)
  - Total: 93
- Time zone: UTC+3:30 (IRST)
  - Summer (DST): UTC+4:30 (IRDT)

Dehnow-e Sarfaryab (Persian: دهنوسرفارياب, also Romanized as Dehnow-e Sarfāryāb; also known as Deh-e Now and Delī Deh-e Now) is a village in Sarfaryab Rural District, Sarfaryab District, Charam County, Kohgiluyeh and Boyer-Ahmad Province, Iran. At the 2006 census, its population was 93, in 23 families.
