= Deh Now-e Gudsar =

Deh Now-e Gudsar دهنوگودسر
- Village
- Country: Iran
- Province: Chaharmahal and Bakhtiari
- County: Lordegan
- Bakhsh: Manj
- Rural District: Barez

Population (2006)
  - Total: 47
- Time zone: UTC+3:30 (IRST)
  - Summer (DST): UTC+4:30 (IRDT)

Deh Now-e Gudsar (Persian: دهنوگودسر, also Romanized as Deh Now-e Gūdsar) is a village in Barez Rural District, Manj District, Lordegan County, Chaharmahal and Bakhtiari Province, Iran. At the 2006 census, its population was 47, in 6 families.
