= Deh-e Now Molla Esmail =

Deh-e Now Molla Esmail دهنوملااسماعيل
- Village
- Location within Iran
- Coordinates: 32°02′18″N 55°57′08″E
- Country: Iran
- Province: Yazd
- County: Behabad
- Bakhsh: Central
- Rural District: Jolgeh

Population (2006)
  - Total: 148
- Time zone: UTC+3:30 (IRST)
  - Summer (DST): UTC+4:30 (IRDT)

Deh-e Now Molla Esmail (Persian: دهنوملااسماعيل, also Romanized as Deh-e Now Mollā Esmā‘īl and Deh Now-e Mollā Esmā‘īl) is a village in Jolgeh Rural District, in the Central District of Behabad County, Yazd Province, Iran. At the 2006 census, its population was 148, in 38 families.
