= Deh-e Now-e Abdolvand =

Deh-e Now-e Abdolvand دهنوعبدالوند
- Village
- Location within Iran
- Coordinates: 33°21′05″N 49°32′37″E
- Country: Iran
- Province: Lorestan
- County: Aligudarz
- Bakhsh: Central
- Rural District: Pachehlak-e Sharqi

Population (2006)
  - Total: 171
- Time zone: UTC+3:30 (IRST)
  - Summer (DST): UTC+4:30 (IRDT)

Deh-e Now-e Abdolvand (Persian: دهنوعبدالوند, also Romanized as Deh-e Now-e ‘Abdolvand; also known as Deh Now) is a village in Pachehlak-e Sharqi Rural District, in the Central District of Aligudarz County, Lorestan Province, Iran. At the 2006 census, its population was 171, in 35 families.
