= Dehnow-e Amlak =

Dehnow-e Amlak دهنواملاك
- Village
- Location within Iran
- Coordinates: 28°35′13″N 57°49′54″E
- Country: Iran
- Province: Kerman
- County: Jiroft
- Bakhsh: Central
- Rural District: Dowlatabad

Population (2006)
  - Total: 674
- Time zone: UTC+3:30 (IRST)
  - Summer (DST): UTC+4:30 (IRDT)

Dehnow-e Amlak (Persian: دهنواملاك, also Romanized as Dehnow-e Āmlāk; also known as Dehnu-e Āmlāk) is a village in Dowlatabad Rural District, in the Central District of Jiroft County, Kerman Province, Iran. At the 2006 census, its population was 674, in 132 families.
