= Deh Now, Khatam =

Deh Now دهنو
- Village
- Location within Iran
- Coordinates: 30°32′59″N 54°13′03″E
- Country: Iran
- Province: Yazd
- County: Khatam
- Bakhsh: Marvast
- Rural District: Harabarjan

Population (2006)
  - Total: 20
- Time zone: UTC+3:30 (IRST)
  - Summer (DST): UTC+4:30 (IRDT)

Deh Now (Persian: دهنو, also Romanized as Deh-e Now and Deh-i-Nau) is a village in Harabarjan Rural District, Marvast District, Khatam County, Yazd Province, Iran. At the 2006 census, its population was 20, in 4 families.
