= Deh Now-e Maragh =

Deh Now-e Maragh دهنومراغ
- Village
- Location within Iran
- Coordinates: 26°50′54″N 54°17′54″E
- Country: Iran
- Province: Hormozgan
- County: Bandar Lengeh
- Bakhsh: Shibkaveh
- Rural District: Bandar Charak

Population (2006)
  - Total: 163
- Time zone: UTC+3:30 (IRST)
  - Summer (DST): UTC+4:30 (IRDT)

Deh Now-e Maragh (Persian: دهنومراغ, also Romanized as Deh Now-e Marāgh, Dehnow Maragh, Deh Now-ye Marāgh, and Deh-i-Nau Marāgh) is a village in Bandar Charak Rural District, Shibkaveh District, Bandar Lengeh County, Hormozgan Province, Iran. At the 2006 census, its population was 163, in 29 families.
