= Deh-e Now, Izeh =

Deh-e Now دهنو
- Village
- Location within Iran
- Coordinates: 32°02′41″N 49°50′54″E
- Country: Iran
- Province: Khuzestan
- County: Izeh
- Bakhsh: Central
- Rural District: Pian

Population (2006)
  - Total: 388
- Time zone: UTC+3:30 (IRST)
  - Summer (DST): UTC+4:30 (IRDT)

Deh-e Now (Persian: دهنو) is a village in Pian Rural District, in the Central District of Izeh County, Khuzestan Province, Iran. At the 2006 census, its population was 388, in 61 families.
