= Dehnow-e Ludab =

Dehnow-e Ludab دهنولوداب
- Village
- Location within Iran
- Coordinates: 30°59′00″N 50°52′28″E
- Country: Iran
- Province: Kohgiluyeh and Boyer-Ahmad
- County: Boyer-Ahmad
- Bakhsh: Ludab
- Rural District: Ludab

Population (2006)
  - Total: 397
- Time zone: UTC+3:30 (IRST)
  - Summer (DST): UTC+4:30 (IRDT)

Dehnow-e Ludab (Persian: دهنولوداب, also Romanized as Dehnow-e Lūdāb; also known as Dehnow) is a village in Ludab Rural District, Ludab District, Boyer-Ahmad County, Kohgiluyeh and Boyer-Ahmad Province, Iran. At the 2006 census, its population was 397, in 84 families.
