= Dehnow-e Jowkar =

Dehnow-e Jowkar دهنوجوكار
- Village
- Location within Iran
- Coordinates: 31°06′27″N 50°53′32″E
- Country: Iran
- Province: Kohgiluyeh and Boyer-Ahmad
- County: Boyer-Ahmad
- Bakhsh: Margown
- Rural District: Margown

Population (2006)
  - Total: 126
- Time zone: UTC+3:30 (IRST)
  - Summer (DST): UTC+4:30 (IRDT)

Dehnow-e Jowkar (Persian: دهنوجوكار, also Romanized as Dehnow-e Jowkār; also known as Deh-e Jūkar) is a village in Margown Rural District, Margown District, Boyer-Ahmad County, Kohgiluyeh and Boyer-Ahmad Province, Iran. At the 2006 census, its population was 126, in 21 families.
