= Deh Now-e Mirza Zadeh Sejadi =

Deh Now-e Mirza Zadeh Sejadi دهنوميرزازاده سجادي
- Village
- Location within Iran
- Coordinates: 28°50′50″N 58°53′55″E
- Country: Iran
- Province: Kerman
- County: Fahraj
- Bakhsh: Central
- Rural District: Borj-e Akram

Population (2006)
  - Total: 173
- Time zone: UTC+3:30 (IRST)
  - Summer (DST): UTC+4:30 (IRDT)

Deh Now-e Mirza Zadeh Sejadi (Persian: دهنوميرزازاده سجادي, also Romanized as Deh Now-e Mīrzā Zādeh Sejādī; also known as Deh Now, Deh Now-e Mīrzā Zādeh, and Deh Now-ye Mīrzā Nūrollāh) is a village in Borj-e Akram Rural District, in the Central District of Fahraj County, Kerman Province, Iran. At the 2006 census, its population was 173, in 49 families.
