= Deh Now, Shiraz =

Deh Now ده نو
- Village
- Location within Iran
- Coordinates: 29°26′45″N 52°38′03″E
- Country: Iran
- Province: Fars
- County: Shiraz
- Bakhsh: Central
- Rural District: Bid Zard

Population (2006)
  - Total: 1,617
- Time zone: UTC+3:30 (IRST)
  - Summer (DST): UTC+4:30 (IRDT)

Deh Now (Persian: ده نو, also romanized as Deh-i-Nau) is a village in Bid Zard Rural District, in the Central District of Shiraz County, Fars province, Iran. At the 2006 census, its population was 1,617, in 412 families.
