= Dehnow-e Mohammad Khan =

Dehnow-e Mohammad Khan دهنومحمدخان
- Village
- Location within Iran
- Coordinates: 28°03′40″N 57°49′15″E
- Country: Iran
- Province: Kerman
- County: Kahnuj
- Bakhsh: Central
- Rural District: Nakhlestan

Population (2006)
  - Total: 33
- Time zone: UTC+3:30 (IRST)
  - Summer (DST): UTC+4:30 (IRDT)

Dehnow-e Mohammad Khan (Persian: دهنومحمدخان, also Romanized as Dehnow-e Moḩammad Khān; also known as Deh-e Now, Dehnow, and Deh Now) is a village in Nakhlestan Rural District, in the Central District of Kahnuj County, Kerman Province, Iran. At the 2006 census, its population was 33, in 7 families.
