= Dehnow-e Markazi =

Dehnow-e Markazi دهنومركزي
- Village
- Location within Iran
- Coordinates: 30°19′57″N 51°22′45″E
- Country: Iran
- Province: Fars
- County: Rostam
- Bakhsh: Central
- Rural District: Rostam-e Do

Population (2006)
  - Total: 868
- Time zone: UTC+3:30 (IRST)
  - Summer (DST): UTC+4:30 (IRDT)

Dehnow-e Markazi (Persian: دهنومركزي, also Romanized as Dehnow-e Markazī) is a village in Rostam-e Do Rural District, in the Central District of Rostam County, Fars province, Iran. At the 2006 census, its population was 868, in 184 families.
