= Dehnow-e Telmargh =

Dehnow-e Telmargh دهنوتل مرغ
- Village
- Location within Iran
- Coordinates: 30°45′28″N 50°36′58″E
- Country: Iran
- Province: Kohgiluyeh and Boyer-Ahmad
- County: Kohgiluyeh
- Bakhsh: Central
- Rural District: Dehdasht-e Sharqi

Population (2006)
  - Total: 719
- Time zone: UTC+3:30 (IRST)
  - Summer (DST): UTC+4:30 (IRDT)

Dehnow-e Telmargh (Persian: دهنوتل مرغ) is a village in Dehdasht-e Sharqi Rural District, in the Central District of Kohgiluyeh County, Kohgiluyeh and Boyer-Ahmad Province, Iran. At the 2006 census, its population was 719, in 117 families.
