= Mohammadabad-e Dehnow =

Mohammadabad-e Dehnow محمدابادده نو
- Village
- Location within Iran
- Coordinates: 30°27′04″N 55°56′27″E
- Country: Iran
- Province: Kerman
- County: Rafsanjan
- Bakhsh: Central
- Rural District: Razmavaran

Population (2006)
  - Total: 717
- Time zone: UTC+3:30 (IRST)
  - Summer (DST): UTC+4:30 (IRDT)

Mohammadabad-e Dehnow (Persian: محمدابادده نو, also Romanized as Moḩammadābād-e Dehnow; also known as Dehnow (Persian: دهنو) and Moḩammadābād) is a village in Razmavaran Rural District, in the Central District of Rafsanjan County, Kerman Province, Iran. At the 2006 census, its population was 717, in 178 families.
