= Dehnow, Delvar =

Dehnow دهنو
- Village
- Location within Iran
- Coordinates: 28°53′53″N 51°01′57″E
- Country: Iran
- Province: Bushehr
- County: Tangestan
- Bakhsh: Delvar
- Rural District: Delvar

Population (2006)
  - Total: 232
- Time zone: UTC+3:30 (IRST)
  - Summer (DST): UTC+4:30 (IRDT)

Dehnow (Persian: دهنو) is a village in Delvar Rural District, Delvar District, Tangestan County, Bushehr Province, Iran. At the 2006 census, its population was 232, in 55 families.
