= Dehnow, Arzuiyeh =

Dehnow ده نو
- Village
- Location within Iran
- Coordinates: 28°34′27″N 56°38′48″E
- Country: Iran
- Province: Kerman
- County: Arzuiyeh
- Bakhsh: Central
- Rural District: Dehsard

Population (2006)
  - Total: 75
- Time zone: UTC+3:30 (IRST)
  - Summer (DST): UTC+4:30 (IRDT)

Dehnow (Persian: ده نو, also Romanized as Deh-e Now and Deh Nau; also known as Deh Sālār) is a village in Dehsard Rural District, in the Central District of Arzuiyeh County, Kerman Province, Iran. At the 2006 census, its population was 75, in 23 families.
