= Now Deh-e Pasikhan =

Now Deh-e Pasikhan نوده پسيخان
- Village
- Location within Iran
- Coordinates: 37°14′16″N 49°27′30″E
- Country: Iran
- Province: Gilan
- County: Shaft
- Bakhsh: Central
- Rural District: Molla Sara

Population (2006)
  - Total: 157
- Time zone: UTC+3:30 (IRST)
  - Summer (DST): UTC+4:30 (IRDT)

Now Deh-e Pasikhan (Persian: نوده پسيخان, also Romanized as Now Deh-e Pasīkhān) is a village in Molla Sara Rural District, in the Central District of Shaft County, Gilan Province, Iran. At the 2006 census, its population was 157, in 34 families.
