= Dehnow, Dezful =

Dehnow ده نو
- Village
- Location within Iran
- Coordinates: 32°03′33″N 48°34′04″E
- Country: Iran
- Province: Khuzestan
- County: Dezful
- Bakhsh: Choghamish
- Rural District: Kheybar

Population (2006)
  - Total: 666
- Time zone: UTC+3:30 (IRST)
  - Summer (DST): UTC+4:30 (IRDT)

Dehnow (Persian: ده نو, also Romanized as Deh-i-Nau and Deh Now; also known as Khvorīneh Bāqer) is a village in Kheybar Rural District, Choghamish District, Dezful County, Khuzestan Province, Iran. At the 2006 census, its population was 666, in 137 families.
