= Deh Now-ye Gonbaki =

Deh Now-ye Gonbaki دهنوگنبكي
- Village
- Location within Iran
- Coordinates: 28°45′06″N 58°51′06″E
- Country: Iran
- Province: Kerman
- County: Rigan
- Bakhsh: Gonbaki
- Rural District: Gonbaki

Population (2006)
  - Total: 435
- Time zone: UTC+3:30 (IRST)
  - Summer (DST): UTC+4:30 (IRDT)

Deh Now-ye Gonbaki (Persian: دهنوگنبكي, also Romanized as Deh Now-ye Gonbakī and Deh Now-e Gonbakī; also known as Deh-e Now and Deh Now) is a village in Gonbaki Rural District, Gonbaki District, Rigan County, Kerman Province, Iran. At the 2006 census, its population was 435, in 115 families.
