= Dehnow-e Emamzadeh Mahmud =

Dehnow-e Emamzadeh Mahmud دهنوامامزاده محمود
- Village
- Location within Iran
- Coordinates: 31°08′03″N 50°33′12″E
- Country: Iran
- Province: Kohgiluyeh and Boyer-Ahmad
- County: Charam
- Bakhsh: Sarfaryab
- Rural District: Poshteh-ye Zilayi

Population (2006)
  - Total: 34
- Time zone: UTC+3:30 (IRST)
  - Summer (DST): UTC+4:30 (IRDT)

Dehnow-e Emamzadeh Mahmud (Persian: دهنوامامزاده محمود, also Romanized as Dehnow-e Emāmzādeh Maḥmūd; also known as Deh-e Now) is a village in Poshteh-ye Zilayi Rural District, Sarfaryab District, Charam County, Kohgiluyeh and Boyer-Ahmad Province, Iran. At the 2006 census, its population was 34, in 7 families.
