= Chelleh-ye Olya =

Village in Kermanshah, Iran

Chelleh-ye Olya چله عليا
- Village
- Location within Iran
- Coordinates: 34°10′04″N 46°58′33″E
- Country: Iran
- Province: Kermanshah
- County: Kermanshah
- Bakhsh: Firuzabad
- Rural District: Sar Firuzabad

Population (2006)
  - Total: 200
- Time zone: UTC+3:30 (IRST)
  - Summer (DST): UTC+4:30 (IRDT)

Chelleh-ye Olya (Persian: چله عليا, also Romanized as Chelleh-ye ‘Olyā and Cheleh-ye ‘Olyā; also known as Chelleh’ī-ye Bālā, Chelleh-ye Bālā, and Cheleh-ye Bālā) is a village in Sar Firuzabad Rural District, Firuzabad District, Kermanshah County, Kermanshah Province, Iran. At the 2006 census, its population was 200, in 44 families.
