= Deh Now, Harsin =

Deh Now ده نو
- Village
- Location within Iran
- Coordinates: 34°13′43″N 47°24′40″E
- Country: Iran
- Province: Kermanshah
- County: Harsin
- Bakhsh: Central
- Rural District: Cheshmeh Kabud

Population (2006)
  - Total: 139
- Time zone: UTC+3:30 (IRST)
  - Summer (DST): UTC+4:30 (IRDT)

Deh Now (Persian: ده نو, also Romanized as Dehnow) is a village in Cheshmeh Kabud Rural District, in the Central District of Harsin County, Kermanshah Province, Iran. At the 2006 census, its population was 139, in 30 families.
