= Deh-e Now, Dehdez =

Deh-e Now دهنو
- Village
- Location within Iran
- Coordinates: 31°37′25″N 50°12′33″E
- Country: Iran
- Province: Khuzestan
- County: Izeh
- Bakhsh: Dehdez
- Rural District: Donbaleh Rud-e Jonubi

Population (2006)
  - Total: 134
- Time zone: UTC+3:30 (IRST)
  - Summer (DST): UTC+4:30 (IRDT)

Deh-e Now (Persian: دهنو; also known as Deh-e Now-ye Shīvand) is a village in Donbaleh Rud-e Jonubi Rural District, Dehdez District, Izeh County, Khuzestan Province, Iran. At the 2006 census, its population was 134, in 26 families.
