= Deh Now-e Do, Bardsir =

Deh Now-e Do دهنو2
- Village
- Location within Iran
- Coordinates: 29°45′52″N 56°12′12″E
- Country: Iran
- Province: Kerman
- County: Bardsir
- Bakhsh: Central
- Rural District: Kuh Panj

Population (2006)
  - Total: 41
- Time zone: UTC+3:30 (IRST)
  - Summer (DST): UTC+4:30 (IRDT)

Deh Now-e Do (Persian: دهنو2; also known as Deh-e Now and Dehnow) is a village in Kuh Panj Rural District, in the Central District of Bardsir County, Kerman Province, Iran. At the 2006 census, its population was 41, in 7 families.
