= Dehnow-e Ansari =

Dehnow-e Ansari دهنوانصاري
- Village
- Location within Iran
- Coordinates: 28°54′57″N 58°51′24″E
- Country: Iran
- Province: Kerman
- County: Fahraj
- Bakhsh: Central
- Rural District: Fahraj

Population (2006)
  - Total: 300
- Time zone: UTC+3:30 (IRST)
  - Summer (DST): UTC+4:30 (IRDT)

Dehnow-e Ansari (Persian: دهنوانصاري, also Romanized as Dehnow-e Ānṣārī; also known as Dehnow-e Sardegal) is a village in Fahraj Rural District, in the Central District of Fahraj County, Kerman Province, Iran. At the 2006 census, its population was 300, in 75 families.
