= Now Deh, Dasht-e Sar =

Village in Mazandaran province, Iran

Now Deh Persian: نوده
- Village
- Location within Iran
- Coordinates: 36°24′31″N 52°28′03″E
- Country: Iran
- Province: Mazandaran
- County: Amol
- District: Dasht-e Sar
- Rural District: Dasht-e Sar-e Sharqi

Population (2016)
  - Total: 636
- Time zone: UTC+3:30 (IRST)

Now Deh (Persian: نوده) is a village in Dasht-e Sar-e Sharqi Rural District (Note: Formerly Dasht-e Sar Rural District) of Dasht-e Sar District in Amol County, Mazandaran province, Iran.

== Demographics ==
=== Population ===
At the time of the 2006 National Census, the village's population was 554 in 153 households, when it was in Dasht-e Sar Rural District (Note: Renamed Dasht-e Sar-e Sharqi Rural District) of Dabudasht District. The following census in 2011 counted 589 people in 192 households. The 2016 census measured the population of the village as 636 people in 211 households, by which time the rural district had been separated from the district in the formation of Dasht-e Sar District and renamed Dasht-e Sar-e Sharqi Rural District.
