= Dehnow-e Ghuri =

Dehnow-e Guri دهنوغوري
- Village
- Country: Iran
- Province: Fars
- County: Kazerun
- Bakhsh: Chenar Shahijan
- Rural District: Somghan

Population (2006)
  - Total: 659
- Time zone: UTC+3:30 (IRST)
  - Summer (DST): UTC+4:30 (IRDT)

Dehnow-e Ghuri (Persian: دهنوغوري, also Romanized as Dehnow-e Ghūrī) is a village in Somghan Rural District, Chenar Shahijan District, Kazerun County, Fars province, Iran. At the 2006 census, its population was 659, in 129 families.
