= Deh Now, Falard =

Deh Now دهنو
- Village
- Location within Iran
- Coordinates: 31°17′16″N 51°09′10″E
- Country: Iran
- Province: Chaharmahal and Bakhtiari
- County: Lordegan
- Bakhsh: Falard
- Rural District: Poshtkuh

Population (2006)
  - Total: 164
- Time zone: UTC+3:30 (IRST)
  - Summer (DST): UTC+4:30 (IRDT)

Deh Now (Persian: دهنو; also known as Shahr-e Now) is a village in Poshtkuh Rural District, Falard District, Lordegan County, Chaharmahal and Bakhtiari Province, Iran. At the 2006 census, its population was 164, in 38 families. The village is populated by Lurs.
