= Rud-e Hasan-e Sofla =

Rud-e Hasan-e Sofla رودحسن سفلي
- Village
- Location within Iran
- Coordinates: 34°07′28″N 48°22′18″E
- Country: Iran
- Province: Hamadan
- County: Nahavand
- Bakhsh: Central
- Rural District: Shaban

Population (2006)
  - Total: 73
- Time zone: UTC+3:30 (IRST)
  - Summer (DST): UTC+4:30 (IRDT)

Rud-e Hasan-e Sofla (Persian: رودحسن سفلي, also Romanized as Rūd-e Ḩasan-e Soflá and Rūd Ḩasan-e Soflá; also known as Kaleh Mar Sofla, Kalleh Mār, Kalleh Mār-e Pā’īn, and Kalleh Mār-e Soflá) is a village in Shaban Rural District, in the Central District of Nahavand County, Hamadan Province, Iran. At the 2006 census, its population was 73, in 20 families.
