= Deh Now-e Gork Allah =

Village in Chaharmahal and Bakhtiari province, Iran

Deh Now-e Gork Allah Persian: ده نوگرك اله
- Village
- Location within Iran
- Coordinates: 31°23′31″N 51°03′24″E
- Country: Iran
- Province: Chaharmahal and Bakhtiari
- County: Lordegan
- District: Central
- Rural District: Rig

Population (2016)
  - Total: 640
- Time zone: UTC+3:30 (IRST)

Deh Now-e Gork Allah (Persian: ده نوگرك اله) (Note: Also romanized as Deh Now-e Gork Allāh; also known as Deh Now-e Gorgallāh, Gorg Allāh, and Gorgollāh) is a village in Rig Rural District of the Central District in Lordegan County, Chaharmahal and Bakhtiari province, Iran.

== Demographics ==
=== Population ===
At the time of the 2006 National Census, the village's population was 635 in 148 households. The following census in 2011 counted 748 people in 190 households. The 2016 census measured the population of the village as 640 people in 194 households.
