= Deh Now-ye Gelal =

Deh Now-ye Gelal ده نوگلال
- Village
- Location within Iran
- Coordinates: 31°05′43″N 50°43′18″E
- Country: Iran
- Province: Kohgiluyeh and Boyer-Ahmad
- County: Boyer-Ahmad
- Bakhsh: Ludab
- Rural District: Chin

Population (2006)
  - Total: 25
- Time zone: UTC+3:30 (IRST)
  - Summer (DST): UTC+4:30 (IRDT)

Deh Now-ye Gelal (Persian: ده نوگلال, also romanized as Deh Now-ye Gelāl) is a village in Chin Rural District, Ludab District, Boyer-Ahmad County, Kohgiluyeh and Boyer-Ahmad Province, Iran. At the 2006 census, its population was 25, in 6 families.
