= Dehnow-e Salehabad =

Dehnow-e Salehabad دهنوصالح اباد
- Village
- Country: Iran
- Province: Kerman
- County: Fahraj
- Bakhsh: Negin Kavir
- Rural District: Chahdegal

Population (2006)
  - Total: 149
- Time zone: UTC+3:30 (IRST)
  - Summer (DST): UTC+4:30 (IRDT)

Dehnow-e Salehabad (Persian: دهنوصالح اباد, also Romanized as Dehnow-e Şāleḥābād) is a village in Chahdegal Rural District, Negin Kavir District, Fahraj County, Kerman Province, Iran. At the 2006 census, its population was 149, in 44 families.
