= Now Deh, Mashhad =

Now Deh نوده
- Village
- Location within Iran
- Coordinates: 36°23′12″N 59°31′34″E
- Country: Iran
- Province: Razavi Khorasan
- County: Mashhad
- Bakhsh: Central
- Rural District: Tus

Population (2006)
  - Total: 20,771
- Time zone: UTC+3:30 (IRST)
  - Summer (DST): UTC+4:30 (IRDT)

Now Deh (Persian: نوده, also Romanized as Now Deh; also known as Now Deh-e Bālā) is a village in Tus Rural District, in the Central District of Mashhad County, Razavi Khorasan Province, Iran. At the 2006 census, its population was 20,771, in 5,244 families.
