= Now Deh, Buin Zahra =

Village in Qazvin province, Iran

Now Deh Persian: نوده
- Village
- Location within Iran
- Coordinates: 35°48′18″N 49°50′25″E
- Country: Iran
- Province: Qazvin
- County: Buin Zahra
- District: Ramand
- Rural District: Ebrahimabad

Population (2016)
  - Total: 427
- Time zone: UTC+3:30 (IRST)

Now Deh (Persian: نوده) (Note: Also romanized as Nowdeh) is a village in Ebrahimabad Rural District of Ramand District in Buin Zahra County, Qazvin province, Iran.

== Demographics ==
=== Population ===
At the time of the 2006 National Census, the village's population was 457 in 134 households. The following census in 2011 counted 444 people in 130 households. The 2016 census measured the population of the village as 427 people in 137 households.
