= Deh-e Now Dasht =

Deh-e Now Dasht ده نودشت
- Village
- Location within Iran
- Coordinates: 31°57′44″N 55°57′53″E
- Country: Iran
- Province: Yazd
- County: Behabad
- Bakhsh: Central
- Rural District: Jolgeh

Population (2006)
  - Total: 185
- Time zone: UTC+3:30 (IRST)
  - Summer (DST): UTC+4:30 (IRDT)

Deh-e Now Dasht (Persian: ده نودشت, also Romanized as Dehnow Dasht) is a village in Jolgeh Rural District, in the Central District of Behabad County, Yazd Province, Iran. At the 2006 census, its population was 185, in 55 families.
