= Deh Now-e Salar =

Deh Now-e Salar ده نو سالار
- Village
- Location within Iran
- Coordinates: 30°27′22″N 57°47′45″E
- Country: Iran
- Province: Kerman
- County: Kerman
- Bakhsh: Shahdad
- Rural District: Takab

Population (2006)
  - Total: 284
- Time zone: UTC+3:30 (IRST)
  - Summer (DST): UTC+4:30 (IRDT)

Deh Now-e Salar (Persian: ده نو سالار, also Romanized as Deh Now-e Sālār; also known as Deh Now) is a village in Takab Rural District, Shahdad District, Kerman County, Kerman Province, Iran. At the 2006 census, its population was 284, in 63 families.
