= Shaban, Hamadan =

Village in Hamadan province, Iran

Shaban Persian: شعبان
- Village
- Location within Iran
- Coordinates: 34°07′16″N 48°25′03″E
- Country: Iran
- Province: Hamadan
- County: Nahavand
- District: Central
- Rural District: Shaban

Population (2016)
  - Total: 1,439
- Time zone: UTC+3:30 (IRST)

Shaban (Persian: شعبان) (Note: Also romanized as Sha‘bān and Shabon; also known as Sa‘bān, Sha‘bānābād, and Shābūn) is a village in Shaban Rural District of the Central District in Nahavand County, Hamadan province, Iran.

== Demographics ==
=== Population ===
At the time of the 2006 National Census, the village's population was 1,756 in 485 households. The following census in 2011 counted 1,531 people in 491 households. The 2016 census measured the population of the village as 1,439 people in 492 households.
