= Kalwar, Madhya Pradesh =

Kalwar
- Village
- Location in Madhya Pradesh, India
- Coordinates: 22.704444°N 76.627222°E
- Country: India
- State: Madhya Pradesh
- District: Dewas
- Elevation: 410 m (1,350 ft)

Languages
  - Official: Hindi
- Time zone: UTC+5:30 (IST)
- ISO 3166 code: IN-MP
- Vehicle registration: MP-

Kalwar is a village in Kannod Mandal, a part of Dewas district in the Indian state of Madhya Pradesh.

Kalwar is 12 kilometres (7.5 mi) from Kannod, the mandal main town, and 64.8 kilometres (40.3 mi) from the district main city, Dewar. It is 100 kilometres (62 mi) from the state capital city of Bhopal.
