= Deh Nowmir =

Deh Nowmir دهنومير
- Village
- Location within Iran
- Coordinates: 26°50′25″N 54°06′53″E
- Country: Iran
- Province: Hormozgan
- County: Bandar Lengeh
- Bakhsh: Shibkaveh
- Rural District: Bandar Charak

Population (2006)
  - Total: 220
- Time zone: UTC+3:30 (IRST)
  - Summer (DST): UTC+4:30 (IRDT)

Deh Nowmir (Persian: دهنومير, also Romanized as Deh Nowmīr and Deh Now-e Mīr) is a village in Bandar Charak Rural District, Shibkaveh District, Bandar Lengeh County, Hormozgan Province, Iran. At the 2006 census, its population was 220, in 40 families.
