= Now Deh-e Meyrmaharab =

Now Deh-e Meyrmaharab نوده ميرمحراب
- Village
- Location within Iran
- Coordinates: 34°21′03″N 58°24′10″E
- Country: Iran
- Province: Razavi Khorasan
- County: Gonabad
- Bakhsh: Kakhk
- Rural District: Zibad

Population (2006)
  - Total: 152
- Time zone: UTC+3:30 (IRST)
  - Summer (DST): UTC+4:30 (IRDT)

Now Deh-e Meyrmaharab (Persian: نوده ميرمحراب, also Romanized as Now Deh-e Meyrmaḥarāb; also known as Now Deh) is a village in Zibad Rural District, Kakhk District, Gonabad County, Razavi Khorasan Province, Iran. At the 2006 census, its population was 152, in 54 families.
