= Dehnow Kashkuli =

Dehnow Kashkuli دهنوكشكولي
- Village
- Location within Iran
- Coordinates: 29°47′40″N 51°33′34″E
- Country: Iran
- Province: Fars
- County: Kazerun
- Bakhsh: Central
- Rural District: Shapur

Population (2006)
  - Total: 243
- Time zone: UTC+3:30 (IRST)
  - Summer (DST): UTC+4:30 (IRDT)

Dehnow Kashkuli (Persian: دهنوكشكولي, also Romanized as Dehnow Kashkūlī; also known as Kashkūlī) is a village in Shapur Rural District, in the Central District of Kazerun County, Fars province, Iran. At the 2006 census, its population was 243, in 40 families.
