= Deh Now-ye Moqaddasi =

Village in Lorestan province, Iran

Deh Now-ye Moqaddasi Persian: ده نومقدسي
- Village
- Location within Iran
- Coordinates: 33°52′16″N 48°48′07″E
- Country: Iran
- Province: Lorestan
- County: Borujerd
- District: Central
- Rural District: Valanjerd

Population (2016)
  - Total: 1,022
- Time zone: UTC+3:30 (IRST)

Deh Now-ye Moqaddasi (Persian: ده نومقدسي) (Note: Also romanized as Dehnow-ye Moqaddasī; also known as Deh Nau, Deh Now, Deh Now-e Maqaddas, Deh Now-ye Moqaddas, and Deh-ī-Nau) is a village in Valanjerd Rural District of the Central District in Borujerd County, Lorestan province, Iran.

== Demographics ==
=== Population ===
At the time of the 2006 National Census, the village's population was 956 in 231 households. The following census in 2011 counted 992 people in 284 households. The 2016 census measured the population of the village as of 1,022 people in 310 households.
