= Dehnow, Sarvestan =

Dehnow دهنو
- Village
- Location within Iran
- Coordinates: 29°13′10″N 53°10′55″E
- Country: Iran
- Province: Fars
- County: Sarvestan
- Bakhsh: Central
- Rural District: Shurjeh

Population (2006)
  - Total: 751
- Time zone: UTC+3:30 (IRST)
  - Summer (DST): UTC+4:30 (IRDT)

Dehnow (Persian: دهنو; also known as Dehnow Sarvestan) is a village in Shurjeh Rural District, in the Central District of Sarvestan County, Fars province, Iran. At the 2006 census, its population was 751, in 166 families.
