= Dehnow-e Chahdegan =

Dehnow-e Chahdegan دهنوچاهدگان
- Village
- Location within Iran
- Coordinates: 28°52′53″N 59°18′39″E
- Country: Iran
- Province: Kerman
- County: Fahraj
- Bakhsh: Negin Kavir
- Rural District: Chahdegal

Population (2006)
  - Total: 245
- Time zone: UTC+3:30 (IRST)
  - Summer (DST): UTC+4:30 (IRDT)

Dehnow-e Chahdegan (Persian: دهنوچاهدگان, also Romanized as Dehnow-e Chāhdegān; also known as Dehnow-e Chahdegāl) is a village in Chahdegal Rural District, Negin Kavir District, Fahraj County, Kerman Province, Iran. At the 2006 census, its population was 245, in 59 families.
