= Ranipuram =

- Village
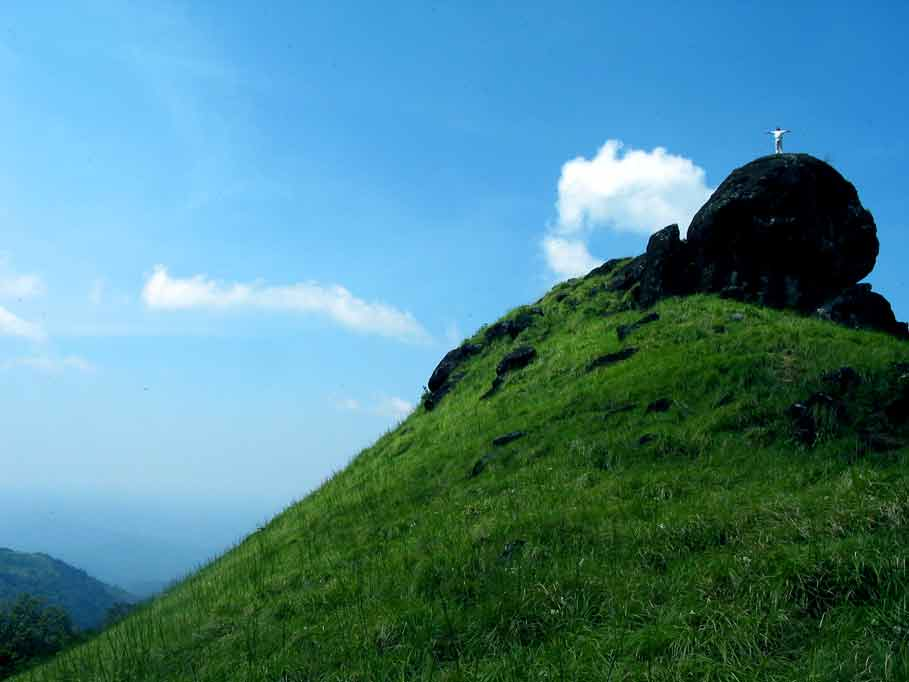
- Ranipuram
- Nickname: Ooty of Kerala
- Location in Kerala, India Ranipuram (India)
- Coordinates: 12.421114°N 75.350075°E
- Country: India
- State: Kerala
- District: Kasaragod

Government
  - Type: Panchayath
  - Body: Panathadi grama panchayath
- Elevation: 1,048 m (3,438 ft)

Languages
  - Official: Malayalam
- Time zone: UTC+5:30 (IST)
- PIN: 671532
- Area code: 0467
- Vehicle registration: KL-79

Ranipuram, formerly Madathumala, is a village and a major tourist attraction in the Kasaragod district of the Indian state of Kerala. It is located near Talakaveri Wildlife Sanctuary in Kerala-Karnataka border. Situated at 1,048 metres (3,438 ft) above mean sea level, Ranipuram is 48 km from the nearest city Kanhangad and 107 km from the major port city of Mangalore.

== See also ==
- Kanhangad
- Kasaragod
- Tourist attractions in Kasaragod
