= Dehnow-e Hajj Ali Mohammad =

Dehnow-e Hajj Ali Mohammad دهنوحاج علي محمد
- Village
- Location within Iran
- Coordinates: 27°40′34″N 58°06′13″E
- Country: Iran
- Province: Kerman
- County: Qaleh Ganj
- Bakhsh: Central
- Rural District: Sorkh Qaleh

Population (2006)
  - Total: 221
- Time zone: UTC+3:30 (IRST)
  - Summer (DST): UTC+4:30 (IRDT)

Dehnow-e Hajj Ali Mohammad (Persian: دهنوحاج علي محمد, also romanized as Dehnow-e Ḩājj ʿAlī Moḩammad; also known as Dehno) is a village in Sorkh Qaleh Rural District, in the Central District of Qaleh Ganj County, Kerman Province, Iran. At the 2006 census, its population was 221, in 48 families.
