= Deh Now-e Khvajeh =

Deh Now-e Khvajeh دهنوخوايه
- Village
- Location within Iran
- Coordinates: 27°03′08″N 54°02′54″E
- Country: Iran
- Province: Hormozgan
- County: Bastak
- Bakhsh: Jenah
- Rural District: Faramarzan

Population (2006)
  - Total: 220
- Time zone: UTC+3:30 (IRST)
  - Summer (DST): UTC+4:30 (IRDT)

Deh Now-e Khvajeh (Persian: دهنوخواجه, also Romanized as Deh Now-e Khvājeh, Deh-e Now-e Khvājeh, Deh-e Now Khvājeh, Dehnow Khajeh, and Dehnow Khvājeh; also known as Deh-i-Nāu and Deh-e Now) is a village in Faramarzan Rural District, Jenah District, Bastak County, Hormozgan Province, Iran. At the 2006 census, its population was 220, in 57 families.
