= Dehnow, Rafsanjan =

Dehnow ده نو
- Village
- Location within Iran
- Coordinates: 30°27′18″N 55°56′39″E
- Country: Iran
- Province: Kerman
- County: Rafsanjan
- Bakhsh: Central
- Rural District: Eslamiyeh

Population (2006)
  - Total: 46
- Time zone: UTC+3:30 (IRST)
  - Summer (DST): UTC+4:30 (IRDT)

Dehnow (Persian: ده نو; also known as Dehnow-ye Mollā Moḩammad Taqī) is a village in Eslamiyeh Rural District, in the Central District of Rafsanjan County, Kerman Province, Iran. At the 2006 census, its population was 46, in 14 families.
