= Dehnow-e Jari =

Dehnow-e Jari دهنوجري
- Village
- Location within Iran
- Coordinates: 28°00′56″N 58°30′17″E
- Country: Iran
- Province: Kerman
- County: Rudbar-e Jonubi
- Bakhsh: Jazmurian
- Rural District: Kuhestan

Population (2006)
  - Total: 24
- Time zone: UTC+3:30 (IRST)
  - Summer (DST): UTC+4:30 (IRDT)

Dehnow-e Jari (Persian: دهنوجري, also Romanized as Dehnow-e Jarī; also known as Dehno) is a village in Kuhestan Rural District, Jazmurian District, Rudbar-e Jonubi County, Kerman Province, Iran. As of the 2006 census, its population was 24, made up of 5 families.
