= Dehnow-e Seh =

Dehnow-e Seh ده نو3
- Village
- Location within Iran
- Coordinates: 29°21′44″N 56°35′58″E
- Country: Iran
- Province: Kerman
- County: Baft
- Bakhsh: Central
- Rural District: Fathabad

Population (2006)
  - Total: 57
- Time zone: UTC+3:30 (IRST)
  - Summer (DST): UTC+4:30 (IRDT)

Dehnow-e Seh (Persian: ده نو3, also known as Deh-e Now and Dehnow) is a village in Fathabad Rural District, in the Central District of Baft County, Kerman Province, Iran. At the 2006 census, its population was 57, in 14 families.
