= Now Deh-e Gonabad =

Now Deh-e Gonabad نوده گناباد
- Village
- Location within Iran
- Coordinates: 34°22′16″N 58°44′50″E
- Country: Iran
- Province: Razavi Khorasan
- County: Gonabad
- Bakhsh: Central
- Rural District: Howmeh

Population (2006)
  - Total: 198
- Time zone: UTC+3:30 (IRST)
  - Summer (DST): UTC+4:30 (IRDT)

Now Deh-e Gonabad (Persian: نوده گناباد, also Romanized as Now Deh-e Gonābād; also known as Now Deh and Naudeh) is a village in Howmeh Rural District, in the Central District of Gonabad County, Razavi Khorasan Province, Iran. At the 2006 census, its population was 198, in 58 families.
