= Dehnow-e Bala, Hormozgan =

Village in Hormozgan, Iran

Dehnow-e Bala دهنوبالا
- Village
- Location within Iran
- Coordinates: 27°21′19″N 56°32′48″E
- Country: Iran
- Province: Hormozgan
- County: Bandar Abbas
- Bakhsh: Qaleh Qazi
- Rural District: Qaleh Qazi

Population (2006)
  - Total: 780
- Time zone: UTC+3:30 (IRST)
  - Summer (DST): UTC+4:30 (IRDT)

Dehnow-e Bala (Persian: دهنوبالا, also romanized as Dehnow-e Bālā; also known as Dehnow) is a village in Qaleh Qazi Rural District, Qaleh Qazi District, Bandar Abbas County, Hormozgan Province, Iran. At the 2006 census, its population was 780, in 137 families.
