= Deh Now-e Kheyari =

Deh Now-e Kheyari دهنوخياري
- Village
- Location within Iran
- Coordinates: 30°28′13″N 55°03′31″E
- Country: Iran
- Province: Kerman
- County: Shahr-e Babak
- Bakhsh: Dehaj
- Rural District: Dehaj

Population (2006)
  - Total: 202
- Time zone: UTC+3:30 (IRST)
  - Summer (DST): UTC+4:30 (IRDT)

Deh Now-e Kheyari (Persian: دهنوخياري, also Romanized as Deh Now-e Kheyārī; also known as Deh Now and Deh Now-e Pā’īn) is a village in Dehaj Rural District, Dehaj District, Shahr-e Babak County, Kerman Province, Iran. At the 2006 census, its population was 202, in 30 families.
