= Kallar-e Olya =

Village in Chaharmahal and Bakhtiari province, Iran

Kallar-e Olya Persian: كلارعليا
- Village
- Location within Iran
- Coordinates: 31°24′29″N 51°03′23″E
- Country: Iran
- Province: Chaharmahal and Bakhtiari
- County: Lordegan
- District: Central
- Rural District: Rig

Population (2016)
  - Total: 632
- Time zone: UTC+3:30 (IRST)

Kallar-e Olya (Persian: كلارعليا) (Note: Also romanized as Kallār-e ‘Olyā and Kalār-e ‘Olyā; also known as Kallār-e ‘Amūqolī and Kallār-e Bālā) is a village in, and the capital of, Rig Rural District in the Central District of Lordegan County, Chaharmahal and Bakhtiari province, Iran.

== Demographics ==
=== Population ===
At the time of the 2006 National Census, the village's population was 451 in 87 households. The following census in 2011 counted 708 people in 156 households. The 2016 census measured the population of the village as 632 people in 152 households.
