= Deh Now-ye Olya, Kiar =

Deh Now-ye Olya ده نوعليا
- Village
- Location within Iran
- Coordinates: 31°54′17″N 50°42′14″E
- Country: Iran
- Province: Chaharmahal and Bakhtiari
- County: Kiar
- Bakhsh: Naghan
- Rural District: Naghan

Population (2006)
  - Total: 185
- Time zone: UTC+3:30 (IRST)
  - Summer (DST): UTC+4:30 (IRDT)

Deh Now-ye Olya (Persian: ده نوعليا, also Romanized as Deh Now-ye ‘Olyā) is a village in Naghan Rural District, Naghan District, Kiar County, Chaharmahal and Bakhtiari Province, Iran. At the 2006 census, its population was 185, in 38 families. The village is populated by Lurs.
