= Shaban Rural District (Nahavand County) =

Rural district in Hamadan province, Iran

Shaban Rural District Persian: دهستان شعبان
- Rural District
- Location within Iran
- Coordinates: 34°09′N 48°22′E
- Country: Iran
- Province: Hamadan
- County: Nahavand
- District: Central
- Established: 1987
- Capital: Kuhani

Population (2016)
  - Total: 14,321
- Time zone: UTC+3:30 (IRST)

Shaban Rural District (Persian: دهستان شعبان) is in the Central District of Nahavand County, Hamadan province, Iran. Its capital is the village of Kuhani.

== Demographics ==
=== Population ===
At the time of the 2006 National Census, the rural district's population was 15,321 in 4,008 households. There were 15,250 inhabitants in 4,556 households at the following census of 2011. The 2016 census measured the population of the rural district as 14,321 in 4,413 households. The most populous of its 36 villages was Kuhani, with 2,674 people.

=== Other villages in the rural district ===
- Baba Rostam
- Deh Now-e Olya
- Deh Now-e Sofla
- Fiazaman
- Jahanabad
- Shaban
- Tekkeh
