= Deh-e Now, Zagheh =

Deh-e Now دهنو
- Village
- Location within Iran
- Coordinates: 33°24′24″N 48°39′09″E
- Country: Iran
- Province: Lorestan
- County: Khorramabad
- Bakhsh: Zagheh
- Rural District: Zagheh

Population (2006)
  - Total: 79
- Time zone: UTC+3:30 (IRST)
  - Summer (DST): UTC+4:30 (IRDT)

Deh-e Now (Persian: دهنو) is a village in Zagheh Rural District, Zagheh District, Khorramabad County, Lorestan Province, Iran. At the 2006 census, its population was 79, in 17 families.
