= Dehnow-ye Sadat-e Vosta =

Dehnow-ye Sadat-e Vosta دهنوسادات وسطي
- Village
- Location within Iran
- Coordinates: 30°18′43″N 51°22′45″E
- Country: Iran
- Province: Fars
- County: Rostam
- Bakhsh: Central
- Rural District: Rostam-e Do

Population (2006)
  - Total: 24
- Time zone: UTC+3:30 (IRST)
  - Summer (DST): UTC+4:30 (IRDT)

Dehnow-ye Sadat-e Vosta (Persian: دهنوسادات وسطي, also Romanized as Dehnow-ye Sādāt-e Vosţá; also known as Deh Now, Deh Now-e Bālā, Deh Now-ye Sādāt-e Mīānī, and Deh Now-ye Sādāt Khalīfeh) is a village in Rostam-e Do Rural District, in the Central District of Rostam County, Fars province, Iran. At the 2006 census, its population was 24, in 6 families.
