= Deh-e Bala, Rafsanjan =

Village in Kerman, Iran

Deh-e Bala ده بالا
- Village
- Location within Iran
- Coordinates: 30°25′33″N 56°36′05″E
- Country: Iran
- Province: Kerman
- County: Rafsanjan
- Bakhsh: Central
- Rural District: Khenaman

Population (2006)
  - Total: 45
- Time zone: UTC+3:30 (IRST)
  - Summer (DST): UTC+4:30 (IRDT)

Deh-e Bala (Persian: ده بالا, also Romanized as Deh-e Bālā; also known as Deh-e Now Bālā, Deh-i-Nau Bāla, and Deh Nau Bāla) is a village in Khenaman Rural District, in the Central District of Rafsanjan County, Kerman Province, Iran. At the 2006 census, its population was 45, in 12 families.
