= Deh Now-e Sofla, Hamadan =

Village in Hamadan province, Iran

Deh Now-e Sofla Persian: دهنوسفلي
- Village
- Location within Iran
- Coordinates: 34°10′02″N 48°21′05″E
- Country: Iran
- Province: Hamadan
- County: Nahavand
- District: Central
- Rural District: Shaban

Population (2016)
  - Total: 564
- Time zone: UTC+3:30 (IRST)

Deh Now-e Sofla (Persian: دهنوسفلي) (Note: Also romanized as Deh Now-e Soflá; also known as Deh Now, Deh Now-e Pā’īn, and Dehnow-e Pā’īn) is a village in Shaban Rural District of the Central District in Nahavand County, Hamadan province, Iran.

== Demographics ==
=== Population ===
At the time of the 2006 National Census, the village's population was 471 in 119 households. The following census in 2011 counted 548 people in 168 households. The 2016 census measured the population of the village as 564 people in 165 households.
