= Deh-e Now, Qaedrahmat =

Village in Lorestan, Iran

Deh-e Now دهنو
- Village
- Location within Iran
- Coordinates: 33°30′19″N 48°47′00″E
- Country: Iran
- Province: Lorestan
- County: Khorramabad
- Bakhsh: Zagheh
- Rural District: Qaedrahmat

Population (2006)
  - Total: 119
- Time zone: UTC+3:30 (IRST)
  - Summer (DST): UTC+4:30 (IRDT)

Deh-e Now (Persian: دهنو, also Romanized as Deh Nau and Dehnow) is a village in Qaedrahmat Rural District, Zagheh District, Khorramabad County, Lorestan Province, Iran. At the 2006 census, its population was 119, in 27 families.
