= Dehnow, Dehpir =

Dehnow دهنو
- Village
- Location within Iran
- Coordinates: 33°27′48″N 48°25′41″E
- Country: Iran
- Province: Lorestan
- County: Khorramabad
- Bakhsh: Central
- Rural District: Dehpir

Population (2006)
  - Total: 106
- Time zone: UTC+3:30 (IRST)
  - Summer (DST): UTC+4:30 (IRDT)

Dehnow (Persian: دهنو) is a village in Dehpir Rural District, in the Central District of Khorramabad County, Lorestan Province, Iran. At the 2006 census, its population was 106, in 21 families.
