= Deh Now-e Qaleh Olya =

Village in Kerman, Iran

Deh Now-e Qaleh Olya دهنوقلعه عليا
- Village
- Location within Iran
- Coordinates: 29°34′22″N 55°28′25″E
- Country: Iran
- Province: Kerman
- County: Sirjan
- Bakhsh: Central
- Rural District: Zeydabad

Population (2006)
  - Total: 131
- Time zone: UTC+3:30 (IRST)
  - Summer (DST): UTC+4:30 (IRDT)

Deh Now-e Qaleh Olya (Persian: دهنوقلعه عليا, also Romanized as Deh Now-e Qal‘eh ‘Olyā; also known as Deh Now Bālā and Deh Now-e Bālā) is a village in Zeydabad Rural District, in the Central District of Sirjan County, Kerman Province, Iran. At the 2006 census, its population was 131, in 36 families.
