= Deh Now-e Kakan =

Deh Now-e Kakan ده نوكاكان
- Village
- Location within Iran
- Coordinates: 30°35′39″N 51°48′53″E
- Country: Iran
- Province: Kohgiluyeh and Boyer-Ahmad
- County: Boyer-Ahmad
- Bakhsh: Central
- Rural District: Kakan

Population (2006)
  - Total: 40
- Time zone: UTC+3:30 (IRST)
  - Summer (DST): UTC+4:30 (IRDT)

Deh Now-e Kakan (Persian: ده نوكاكان, also Romanized as Deh Now-e Kākān; also known as Deh Now and Towḩīdābād) is a village in Kakan Rural District, in the Central District of Boyer-Ahmad County, Kohgiluyeh and Boyer-Ahmad Province, Iran. At the 2006 census, its population was 40, in 9 families.
