= Deh-e Now, Birjand =

Deh-e Now ده نو
- Village
- Location within Iran
- Coordinates: 32°50′46″N 59°05′34″E
- Country: Iran
- Province: South Khorasan
- County: Birjand
- Bakhsh: Central
- Rural District: Baqeran

Population (2006)
  - Total: 442
- Time zone: UTC+3:30 (IRST)
  - Summer (DST): UTC+4:30 (IRDT)

Deh-e Now (Persian: ده نو, also Romanized as Deh-i-Nau; also known as Deh-e Now-e Pā’īn) is a village in Baqeran Rural District, in the Central District of Birjand County, South Khorasan Province, Iran. At the 2006 census, its population was 442, in 115 families.
