= Deh Now, Lamerd =

Deh Now ده نو
- Village
- Location within Iran
- Coordinates: 27°27′23″N 53°22′36″E
- Country: Iran
- Province: Fars
- County: Lamerd
- Bakhsh: Central
- Rural District: Chah Varz

Population (2006)
  - Total: 1,458
- Time zone: UTC+3:30 (IRST)
  - Summer (DST): UTC+4:30 (IRDT)

Deh Now (Persian: ده نو; also known as Deh Now-e 'ājjī Hedāyat, Deh Now-ye Bālā, and Deh Now-ye Fāẕelī) is a village in Chah Varz Rural District, in the Central District of Lamerd County, Fars province, Iran. At the 2006 census, its population was 1,458, in 268 families.
