= Dametir-e Shomali =

Dametir-e Shomali دمتير شمالي
- Village
- Location within Iran
- Coordinates: 27°07′33″N 53°18′11″E
- Country: Iran
- Province: Hormozgan
- County: Parsian
- Bakhsh: Central
- Rural District: Mehregan

Population (2006)
  - Total: 397
- Time zone: UTC+3:30 (IRST)
  - Summer (DST): UTC+4:30 (IRDT)

Dametir-e Shomali (Persian: دمتير شمالي, also Romanized as Dametīr-e Shomālī; also known as Dehnow Damītar-e Shomālī) is a village in Mehregan Rural District, in the Central District of Parsian County, Hormozgan Province, Iran. At the 2006 census, its population was 397, in 79 families.
