= Deh Now-e Olya, Hamadan =

Village in Hamadan province, Iran

Deh Now-e Olya Persian: دهنوعليا
- Village
- Location within Iran
- Coordinates: 34°09′15″N 48°21′43″E
- Country: Iran
- Province: Hamadan
- County: Nahavand
- District: Central
- Rural District: Shaban

Population (2016)
  - Total: 461
- Time zone: UTC+3:30 (IRST)

Deh Now-e Olya (Persian: دهنوعليا) (Note: Also romanized as Deh Now-e ‘Olyā and Dehnow Olya; also known as Deh Now and Dehnow-e Bālā) is a village in Shaban Rural District of the Central District in Nahavand County, Hamadan province, Iran.

== Demographics ==
=== Population ===
At the time of the 2006 National Census, the village's population was 472 in 124 households. The following census in 2011 counted 468 people in 132 households. The 2016 census measured the population of the village as 461 people in 141 households.
