= Dehnow-ye Sofla, Kuhrang =

Dehnow-ye Sofla ده نوسفلي
- Village
- Location within Iran
- Coordinates: 32°26′36″N 50°12′05″E
- Country: Iran
- Province: Chaharmahal and Bakhtiari
- County: Kuhrang
- Bakhsh: Central
- Rural District: Shurab-e Tangazi

Population (2006)
  - Total: 177
- Time zone: UTC+3:30 (IRST)
  - Summer (DST): UTC+4:30 (IRDT)

Dehnow-ye Sofla (Persian: ده نوسفلي, also Romanized as Dehnow-ye Soflá, Dehnow-e Soflá, and Deh Now Soflá; also known as Deh Now-ye Pā’īn and Nūs‘alī) is a village in Shurab-e Tangazi Rural District, in the Central District of Kuhrang County, Chaharmahal and Bakhtiari Province, Iran. At the 2006 census, its population was 177, in 30 families. The village is populated by Lurs.
