= Deh Now-ye Sofla, Kiar =

Deh Now-ye Sofla ده نوسفلي
- Village
- Location within Iran
- Coordinates: 31°54′17″N 50°42′14″E
- Country: Iran
- Province: Chaharmahal and Bakhtiari
- County: Kiar
- Bakhsh: Naghan
- Rural District: Naghan

Population (2006)
  - Total: 24
- Time zone: UTC+3:30 (IRST)
  - Summer (DST): UTC+4:30 (IRDT)

Deh Now-ye Sofla (Persian: ده نوسفلي, also Romanized as Deh Now-ye Soflá and Dehnow-e Soflá; also known as Deh-e Now-e Pā’īn and Deh Now Pā’īn) is a village in Naghan Rural District, Naghan District, Kiar County, Chaharmahal and Bakhtiari Province, Iran. At the 2006 census, its population was 24, in 5 families. The village is populated by Lurs.
