= Dehnow-e Olya, Kuhrang =

Village in Chaharmahal and Bakhtiari province, Iran

Dehnow-e Olya Persian: ده نوعليا
- Village
- Location within Iran
- Coordinates: 32°26′10″N 50°11′35″E
- Country: Iran
- Province: Chaharmahal and Bakhtiari
- County: Kuhrang
- District: Central
- Rural District: Shurab-e Tangazi

Population (2016)
  - Total: 737
- Time zone: UTC+3:30 (IRST)

Dehnow-e Olya (Persian: ده نوعليا) (Note: Also romanized as Dehnow-e ‘Olyā; also known as Deh Now and Deh Now-e Bālā) is a village in Shurab-e Tangazi Rural District of the Central District in Kuhrang County, Chaharmahal and Bakhtiari province, Iran.

The lords big of bakhtiyary example aman alah khan babady(امان الله خان بابادی والی کرمان و یزد) and a hajat khan amany babady(آجاجت خان امانی بابادی) is fram dehno(dinoo)(دهنو)

== Demographics ==
=== Ethnicity ===
The village is populated by Lurs.

=== Population ===
At the time of the 2006 National Census, the village's population was 910 in 163 households. The following census in 2011 counted 879 people in 200 households. The 2016 census measured the population of the village as 737 people in 210 households.
