= Rig Rural District =

Rural district in Chaharmahal and Bakhtiari province, Iran

Rig Rural District Persian: دهستان ريگ
- Rural District
- Location within Iran
- Coordinates: 31°23′N 51°02′E
- Country: Iran
- Province: Chaharmahal and Bakhtiari
- County: Lordegan
- District: Central
- Established: 1987
- Capital: Kallar-e Olya

Population (2016)
  - Total: 27,856
- Time zone: UTC+3:30 (IRST)

Rig Rural District (Persian: دهستان ريگ) is in the Central District of Lordegan County, Chaharmahal and Bakhtiari province, Iran. Its capital is the village of Kallar-e Olya.

== Demographics ==
=== Population ===
At the time of the 2006 National Census, the rural district's population was 12,171 in 2,378 households. There were 13,511 inhabitants in 3,079 households at the following census of 2011. The 2016 census measured the population of the rural district as 12,757 in 3,444 households. The most populous of its 24 villages was Monjar Mui, with 2,778 people.

=== Other villages in the rural district ===
- Chaman Bid
- Cheleh Gah
- Chenar-e Mahmudi
- Deh Now-e Gork Allah
- Duleh Sib
- Kohyan
