= Abgarm (disambiguation) =

Abgarm is a city in Qazvin Province, Iran.

Abgarm or Ab-e Garm or Ab Garm or Ab-i-Garm or Abegarm (Persian: ابگرم) may refer to:

== Ardabil Province ==
- Ab-e Garm-e Givy, a village in Kowsar County

== East Azerbaijan Province ==
- Ab-e Garm, East Azerbaijan, a village in Charuymaq County

== Fars Province ==
- Abgarm, Fasa, a village in Fasa County
- Ab-e Garm, Kazerun, a village in Kazerun County
- Abgarm-e Pir Sohabi, a village in Kazerun County
- Abgarm, Mamasani, a village in Mamasani County
- Ab Garm-e Olya, a village in Mamasani County
- Abgarm, Marvdasht, a village in Marvdasht County
- Ab Garm, Qir and Karzin, a village in Qir and Karzin County
- Ab Garm, Sepidan, a village in Sepidan County

== Hormozgan Province ==
- Ab Garm, Bandar Abbas, Hormozgan Province
- Ab Garm, Rudan, Hormozgan Province
- Abgarm, Hajjiabad, Hormozgan Province

== Isfahan Province ==
- Abgarm, Tiran and Karvan, a village in Tiran and Karvan County

== Kerman Province ==
- Ab-e Garm, Ganjabad, a village in Anbarabad County
- Ab Garm, Hoseynabad, a village in Anbarabad County
- Abgarm, Jebalbarez-e Jonubi, a village in Anbarabad County
- Ab Garm, Bam, a village in Bam County
- Ab Garm-e Seyyedi, a village in Bam County
- Abgarm, Bardsir, a village in Bardsir County
- Abgarm, Dalfard, a village in Jiroft County
- Abgarm, Gevar, a village in Jiroft County
- Abgarm, Jebalbarez, a village in Jiroft County
- Ab Garm 1, a village in Jiroft County
- Ab Garm, Narmashir, a village in Narmashir County
- Ab Garm, Rabor, a village in Rabor County
- Abegarm, Rigan, a village in Rigan County
- Abgarm, Rudbar-e Jonubi, a village in Rudbar-e Jonubi County

== Markazi Province ==
- Ab Garm-e Bala, Markazi Province

== Mazandaran Province ==
- Ab-e Garm, Mazandaran, a village in Amol County

== Qazvin Province ==
- Abgarm District, in Qazvin Province
- Abgarm Rural District, in Qazvin Province

== Razavi Khorasan Province ==
- Abgarm, Razavi Khorasan

== South Khorasan Province ==
- Ab Garm, South Khorasan

== West Azerbaijan Province ==
- Ab-e Garm, Chaldoran, a village in Chaldoran County
- Abgarm, Salmas, a village in Salmas County

== See also ==
- Ab Garmeh (disambiguation)
- Ab Garmu (disambiguation)
