= Khvajeh =

Khvajeh (Persian: خواجه) may refer to:

== Afghanistan ==
- Khvajeh Hasan, a village in Bamyan Province
- Khvajeh Jeyran, a village in Baghlan Province
- Khvajeh Kowshah, a village in Bamyan Province
- Khvajeh Owlia', a village in Baghlan Province
- Khvajeh Qalandar, a village in Badghis Province

== Iran ==
- Khvajeh, Iran, a city in East Azerbaijan Province
- Khvajeh Bolaghi, a village in Ardabil Province
- Khvajeh Aur, a village in East Azerbaijan Province
- Khvajeh, Marvdasht, a village in Fars Province
- Khvajeh, Neyriz, a village in Fars Province
- Khvajeh Lar, a village in Golestan Province
- Khvajeh Hoseyni, a village in Hamadan Province
- Khvajeh, Isfahan, a village in Isfahan Province
- Khvajeh Askar, a village in Kerman Province
- Khvajeh Nezam-e Chahar Dang, a village in Kerman Province
- Khvajeh, Ramhormoz, a village in Khuzestan Province
- Qaleh-ye Khvajeh, a city in Khuzestan Province
- Khvajeh, Razavi Khorasan, a village in Razavi Khorasan Province
- Khvajeh, Birjand, a village in South Khorasan Province
- Khvajeh, Sarbisheh, a village in South Khorasan Province
- Khvajeh, Zirkuh, a village in South Khorasan Province

== See also ==
- Khvajehi (disambiguation)
- Khawaja
- Khvajeh is a common element in Iranian place names; see All Wikipedia pages beginning with Khvajeh
