= Dask =

Dask or Desk (Persian: دسك) may refer to:

- Dask, Hormozgan
- Desk, Anbarabad, Kerman Province
- Desk, Bam, Kerman Province
- Desk-e Bala, Kerman Province

== See also ==
- Desk (disambiguation)
- DASK, the first computer in Denmark
- Doğal Afet Sigortaları Kurumu, a government institution in Turkey
- Dask (software), a library for performing parallel computation in Python
