= Desk (disambiguation) =

A desk is a piece of furniture with a flat work surface.

Desk or DESK may also refer to:

== Places in Iran ==
- Dask, Hormozgan
- Desk, Anbarabad, Kerman Province
- Desk, Bam, Kerman Province
- Desk-e Bala, Kerman Province

== Other uses ==
- In newspaper production, a department covering a particular topic
- A pair of players within the string section of an orchestra
- VV DESK, a Netherlands football club
- Deutsche Schule Kobe/European School, a German school in Japan

== See also ==
- Dask (disambiguation)
