= Ab Garmu =

Ab Garmu or Abgarmu or Ab-e Garmu (Persian: اب گرمو) may refer to:

- Ab Garmu, Bushehr
- Ab Garmu-ye Bala, Fars Province
- Ab-e Garmu, Narmashir, Kerman Province
- Ab-e Garmu, Rudbar-e Jonubi, Kerman Province
- Ab Garmu, Kohgiluyeh and Boyer-Ahmad

== See also ==
- Abgarm (disambiguation)
- Ab Garmeh (disambiguation)
