= Darijan =

Village in Kerman province, Iran

Darijan Persian: دريجان
- Village
- Location within Iran
- Coordinates: 29°01′35″N 58°00′45″E
- Country: Iran
- Province: Kerman
- County: Bam
- District: Central
- Rural District: Darijan

Population (2016)
  - Total: 787
- Time zone: UTC+3:30 (IRST)

Darijan (Persian: دريجان) (Note: Also romanized as Darījān) is a village in, and the capital of, Darijan Rural District of the Central District of Bam County, Kerman province, Iran.

== Demographics ==
=== Population ===
At the time of the 2006 National Census, the village's population was 406 in 116 households, when it was in Howmeh Rural District. The following census in 2011 counted 716 people in 308 households. The 2016 census measured the population of the village as 787 people in 283 households.

In 2018, Darijan was transferred to Darijan Rural District created in the district.
