= Bagh Tak =

Bagh Tak باغ تك
- Village
- Location within Iran
- Coordinates: 28°51′34″N 58°12′12″E
- Country: Iran
- Province: Kerman
- County: Bam
- Bakhsh: Central
- Rural District: Howmeh

Population (2006)
  - Total: 171
- Time zone: UTC+3:30 (IRST)
  - Summer (DST): UTC+4:30 (IRDT)

Bagh Tak (Persian: باغ تك, also Romanized as Bāgh Tak) is a village in Howmeh Rural District, in the Central District of Bam County, Kerman Province, Iran. At the time of the 2006 census, its population was 171 people, belonging to 50 families.
