= Gowdpadeh =

Gowdpadeh گودپده
- Village
- Location within Iran
- Coordinates: 28°52′11″N 58°11′43″E
- Country: Iran
- Province: Kerman
- County: Bam
- Bakhsh: Central
- Rural District: Howmeh

Population (2006)
  - Total: 49
- Time zone: UTC+3:30 (IRST)
  - Summer (DST): UTC+4:30 (IRDT)

Gowdpadeh (Persian: گودپده, also Romanized as Godark, Govak, and Gowdark) is a village in Howmeh Rural District, in the Central District of Bam County, Kerman Province, Iran. At the 2006 census, its population was 49, in 20 families.
