= Gowk =

Gowk گوك
- Village
- Location within Iran
- Coordinates: 28°50′37″N 58°13′38″E
- Country: Iran
- Province: Kerman
- County: Bam
- Bakhsh: Central
- Rural District: Howmeh

Population (2006)
  - Total: 14
- Time zone: UTC+3:30 (IRST)
  - Summer (DST): UTC+4:30 (IRDT)

Gowk (Persian: گوك, also Romanized as Govak) is a village in Howmeh Rural District, in the Central District of Bam County, Kerman Province, Iran. At the 2006 census, its population was 14, in 4 families.
