= Pabaneh =

Pabaneh پابنه
- Village
- Location within Iran
- Coordinates: 29°25′04″N 57°45′18″E
- Country: Iran
- Province: Kerman
- County: Bam
- Bakhsh: Central
- Rural District: Howmeh

Population (2006)
  - Total: 59
- Time zone: UTC+3:30 (IRST)
  - Summer (DST): UTC+4:30 (IRDT)

Pabaneh (Persian: پابنه, also Romanized as Pābaneh and Pā Boneh; also known as Pābanen and Pāy Boneh) is a village in Howmeh Rural District, in the Central District of Bam County, Kerman Province, Iran. At the 2006 census, its population was 59, in 20 families.
