= Herarun =

Herarun هرارون
- Village
- Location within Iran
- Coordinates: 29°07′12″N 58°16′14″E
- Country: Iran
- Province: Kerman
- County: Bam
- Bakhsh: Central
- Rural District: Howmeh

Population (2006)
  - Total: 233
- Time zone: UTC+3:30 (IRST)
  - Summer (DST): UTC+4:30 (IRDT)

Herarun (Persian: هرارون, also Romanized as Herārūn and Ḩerārūn; also known as Aḩrāron, Aḩrārūn, and Hezārūn) is a village in Howmeh Rural District, in the Central District of Bam County, Kerman Province, Iran. At the 2006 census, its population was 233, in 69 families.
