= Abareq =

Village in Kerman province, Iran

Abareq Persian: ابارق
- Village
- Location within Iran
- Coordinates: 29°20′55″N 57°56′18″E
- Country: Iran
- Province: Kerman
- County: Bam
- District: Dehbakri
- Rural District: Abareq

Population (2016)
  - Total: 4,568
- Time zone: UTC+3:30 (IRST)

Abareq (Persian: ابارق) (Note: Also romanized as Ābāreq; also known as Ābārak-e Bālā, Abargh, Ebareg Bālā, Ebareg-e Bālā, Ebāreg-e Bālā, Ebāreq-e Bālā, and Erbārag-e Bālā) is a village in, and the capital of, Abareq Rural District of Dehbakri District, Bam County, Kerman province, Iran.

== Demographics ==
=== Population ===
At the time of the 2006 National Census, the village's population was 1,896 in 457 households, when it was in Howmeh Rural District of the Central District. The following census in 2011 counted 3,199 people in 923 households. The 2016 census measured the population of the village as 4,568 people in 1,264 households. It was the most populous village in its rural district.

In 2018, the village was separated from the district in the formation of Dehbakri District and was transferred to Abareq Rural District created in the new district.
