= Hamzehi =

Hamzehi حمزه اي
- Village
- Location within Iran
- Coordinates: 29°07′00″N 58°20′00″E
- Country: Iran
- Province: Kerman
- County: Bam
- Bakhsh: Central
- Rural District: Howmeh

Population (2006)
  - Total: 60
- Time zone: UTC+3:30 (IRST)
  - Summer (DST): UTC+4:30 (IRDT)

Hamzehi (Persian: حمزه اي, also Romanized as Ḩamzeh’ī) is a village in Howmeh Rural District, in the Central District of Bam County, Kerman Province, Iran. At the 2006 census, its population was 60, in 14 families.
