= Tizahang =

Tizahang تيزاهنگ
- Village
- Location within Iran
- Coordinates: 29°09′54″N 57°47′52″E
- Country: Iran
- Province: Kerman
- County: Bam
- Bakhsh: Central
- Rural District: Howmeh

Population (2006)
  - Total: 31
- Time zone: UTC+3:30 (IRST)
  - Summer (DST): UTC+4:30 (IRDT)

Tizahang (Persian: تيزاهنگ, also Romanized as Tīzāhang; also known as Tīzāng) is a village in Howmeh Rural District, in the Central District of Bam County, Kerman Province, Iran. At the 2006 census, its population was 31, in 7 families.
