= Darzin =

Darzin or Darzein (Persian: دارزين) may refer to:

- Darzin, Anbarabad
- Darzin 1, Bam County
- Darzin 2, Bam County
