= Sar Bag-e Juzuiyeh =

Sar Bag-e Juzuiyeh سربگجوزوييه
- Village
- Country: Iran
- Province: Kerman
- County: Bam
- Bakhsh: Central
- Rural District: Deh Bakri

Population (2006)
  - Total: 15
- Time zone: UTC+3:30 (IRST)
  - Summer (DST): UTC+4:30 (IRDT)

Sar Bag-e Juzuiyeh (Persian: سربگجوزوييه, also Romanized as Sar Bag-e Jūzūīyeh) is a village in Deh Bakri Rural District, in the Central District of Bam County, Kerman Province, Iran. At the 2006 census, its population was 15, in 4 families.
