= Galupadeh =

Galupadeh گلوپده
- Village
- Location within Iran
- Coordinates: 28°51′15″N 58°14′50″E
- Country: Iran
- Province: Kerman
- County: Bam
- Bakhsh: Central
- Rural District: Howmeh

Population (2006)
  - Total: 101
- Time zone: UTC+3:30 (IRST)
  - Summer (DST): UTC+4:30 (IRDT)

Galupadeh (Persian: گلوپده, also Romanized as Galūpadeh and Gelūpadeh; also known as Kelūpadeh and Kelūpareh) is a village in Howmeh Rural District, in the Central District of Bam County, Kerman Province, Iran. At the 2006 census, its population was 101, in 24 families.
