= Khvajehi =

Khvajehi (Persian: خواجه اي) may refer to:

- Khvajehi, Fars
- Khvajehi, Kerman
- Khvajehi, South Khorasan

== See also ==
- Khvajeh (disambiguation)
