= Hasankhandan =

Hasankhandan حسن‌خندان
- Village
- Country: Iran
- Province: Kerman
- County: Bam
- Bakhsh: Central
- Rural District: Deh Bakri

Population (2016)
  - Total: 20
- Time zone: UTC+3:30 (IRST)
  - Summer (DST): UTC+4:30 (IRDT)

Hasankhandan (Persian: حسن‌خندان, also Romanized as Hasankhandān) is a village in Deh Bakri Rural District, in the Central District of Bam County, Kerman Province, Iran. At the 2016 census, its population was 20, in 8 families.
