= Negur, Kerman =

Negur نگور
- Village
- Location within Iran
- Coordinates: 29°26′25″N 57°50′33″E
- Country: Iran
- Province: Kerman
- County: Bam
- Bakhsh: Central
- Rural District: Howmeh

Population (2006)
  - Total: 165
- Time zone: UTC+3:30 (IRST)
  - Summer (DST): UTC+4:30 (IRDT)

Negur (Persian: نگور, also Romanized as Negūr, Nagoor, Nagūr; also known as Nakūr) is a village in Howmeh Rural District, in the Central District of Bam County, Kerman Province, Iran. At the 2006 census, its population was 165, in 49 families.
