= Derzerb =

Derzerb درزرب
- village
- Location within Iran
- Coordinates: 28°50′05″N 58°12′54″E
- Country: Iran
- Province: Kerman
- County: Bam
- Bakhsh: Central
- Rural District: Howmeh

Population (2006)
  - Total: 38
- Time zone: UTC+3:30 (IRST)
  - Summer (DST): UTC+4:30 (IRDT)

Derzerb (Persian: درزرب; also known as Dezerv, Dezerve, and Dozdū’īyeh) is a village in Howmeh Rural District, in the Central District of Bam County, Kerman Province, Iran. At the 2006 census, its population was 38, in 11 families.
