= Seyyed Damaneh =

Seyyed Damaneh سيددامنه
- Village
- Country: Iran
- Province: Kerman
- County: Bam
- Bakhsh: Central
- Rural District: Howmeh

Population (2006)
  - Total: 23
- Time zone: UTC+3:30 (IRST)
  - Summer (DST): UTC+4:30 (IRDT)

Seyyed Damaneh (Persian: سيددامنه, also Romanized as Seyyed Dāmaneh) is a village in Howmeh Rural District, in the Central District of Bam County, Kerman Province, Iran. At the 2006 census, its population was 23, in 6 families.
