= Darehderaz =

Coordinates: 34.341168°N 47.024628°E

Darehderaz دره‌دراز
- Village
- Location within Iran
- Country: Iran
- Province: Kerman
- County: Bam
- Bakhsh: Central
- Rural District: Deh Bakri

Population (2016)
  - Total: 54
- Time zone: UTC+3:30 (IRST)
  - Summer (DST): UTC+4:30 (IRDT)

Darehderaz (Persian: دره‌دراز, also Romanized as Darrehderāz) is a village in Deh Bakri Rural District, in the Central District of Bam County, Kerman Province, Iran. At the 2016 census, its population was 54, in 14 families.
