= Sar Parideh =

Sar Parideh سرپريده
- Village
- Location within Iran
- Coordinates: 28°50′34″N 58°12′11″E
- Country: Iran
- Province: Kerman
- County: Bam
- Bakhsh: Central
- Rural District: Howmeh

Population (2006)
  - Total: 58
- Time zone: UTC+3:30 (IRST)
  - Summer (DST): UTC+4:30 (IRDT)

Sar Parideh (Persian: سرپريده, also Romanized as Sar Parīdeh) is a village in Howmeh Rural District, in the Central District of Bam County, Kerman Province, Iran. At the 2006 census, its population was 58, in 13 families.
