= Hasharabad =

Hasharabad or Hasherabad or Hashrabad (Persian: حشراباد) may refer to:

- Hasharabad, Bam
- Hasharabad, Jiroft
- Hasharabad, Rigan
