= Sar Tashtak =

Sar Tashtak سرتشتك
- Village
- Location within Iran
- Coordinates: 29°11′20″N 57°47′21″E
- Country: Iran
- Province: Kerman
- County: Bam
- Bakhsh: Central
- Rural District: Howmeh

Population (2006)
  - Total: 37
- Time zone: UTC+3:30 (IRST)
  - Summer (DST): UTC+4:30 (IRDT)

Sar Tashtak (Persian: سرتشتك) is a village in Howmeh Rural District, in the Central District of Bam County, Kerman Province, Iran. At the 2006 census, its population was 37, in 11 families.
