= Darreh-ye Kalatehi =

Darreh-ye Kalatehi دره كلته اي
- Village
- Country: Iran
- Province: Kerman
- County: Bam
- Bakhsh: Central
- Rural District: Howmeh

Population (2006)
  - Total: 21
- Time zone: UTC+3:30 (IRST)
  - Summer (DST): UTC+4:30 (IRDT)

Darreh-ye Kalatehi (Persian: دره كلته اي, also Romanized as Darreh-ye Kalatehī) is a village in Howmeh Rural District, in the Central District of Bam County, Kerman Province, Iran. At the 2006 census, its population was 21, in 5 families.
