= Aliabad Yek, Deh Bakri =

Aliabad Yek, Deh Bakri علی‌آباد یک، ده‌بکری
- Village
- Country: Iran
- Province: Kerman
- County: Bam
- Bakhsh: Central
- Rural District: Deh Bakri

Population (2016)
  - Total: 15
- Time zone: UTC+3:30 (IRST)
  - Summer (DST): UTC+4:30 (IRDT)

Aliabad Yek (Persian: علی‌آباد یک, Romanized as Ālīābād-e Yek; also known as ‘Ālīābād) is a village in Deh Bakri Rural District, in the Central District of Bam County, Kerman Province, Iran. At the 2016 census, its population was 15, in 7 families.
