= Fadua =

Fadua فدوا
- Village
- Country: Iran
- Province: Kerman
- County: Bam
- Bakhsh: Central
- Rural District: Howmeh

Population (2006)
  - Total: 64
- Time zone: UTC+3:30 (IRST)
  - Summer (DST): UTC+4:30 (IRDT)

Fadua (Persian: فدوا, also Romanized as Fadūā) is a village in Howmeh Rural District, in the Central District of Bam County, Kerman Province, Iran. At the 2006 census, its population was 64, in 21 families.
