= Bidaran-e Now =

Bidaran-e Now بيدران نو
- Village
- Location within Iran
- Coordinates: 29°08′00″N 58°15′00″E
- Country: Iran
- Province: Kerman
- County: Bam
- Bakhsh: Central
- Rural District: Howmeh

Population (2006)
  - Total: 417
- Time zone: UTC+3:30 (IRST)
  - Summer (DST): UTC+4:30 (IRDT)

Bidaran-e Now (Persian: بيدران نو, also Romanized as Bīdarān-e Now; also known as Bīdarān-e Bālā, Deh Davang, and Dowdānag-e Bīdarān) is a village in Howmeh Rural District, in the Central District of Bam County, Kerman Province, Iran. At the 2006 census, its population was 417, in 94 families.
