= Hasharabad, Bam =

Hasharabad حشراباد
- Village
- Location within Iran
- Coordinates: 29°08′42″N 57°54′32″E
- Country: Iran
- Province: Kerman
- County: Bam
- Bakhsh: Central
- Rural District: Deh Bakri

Population (2006)
  - Total: 32
- Time zone: UTC+3:30 (IRST)
  - Summer (DST): UTC+4:30 (IRDT)

Hasharabad (Persian: حشراباد, also Romanized as Ḩasharābād and Ḩasherābād) is a village in Deh Bakri Rural District, in the Central District of Bam County, Kerman Province, Iran. At the 2006 census, its population was 32, in 5 families.
