= Deh Redin =

Deh Redin ده ردين
- Village
- Location within Iran
- Coordinates: 29°06′02″N 57°54′26″E
- Country: Iran
- Province: Kerman
- County: Bam
- Bakhsh: Central
- Rural District: Deh Bakri

Population (2006)
  - Total: 130
- Time zone: UTC+3:30 (IRST)
  - Summer (DST): UTC+4:30 (IRDT)

Deh Redin (Persian: ده ردين, also Romanized as Deh Redīn, Deh-e Redīn, and Deh Radīn; also known as Deh Rerīn and Dūrdīn) is a village in Deh Bakri Rural District, in the Central District of Bam County, Kerman Province, Iran. At the 2006 census, its population was 130, in 32 families.
