= Ab Garm, Bam =

Ab Garm ابگرم
- Village
- Location within Iran
- Coordinates: 29°00′41″N 57°50′16″E
- Country: Iran
- Province: Kerman
- County: Bam
- Bakhsh: Central
- Rural District: Howmeh

Population (2006)
  - Total: 142
- Time zone: UTC+3:30 (IRST)
  - Summer (DST): UTC+4:30 (IRDT)

Ab Garm (Persian: ابگرم, also Romanized as Āb Garm) is a village in Howmeh Rural District, in the Central District of Bam County, Kerman Province, Iran. At the 2006 census, its population was 142, in 47 families.
