= Bidaran =

Bidaran or Bideran (Persian: بيدران) may refer to:

- Bidaran-e Kohneh
- Bidaran-e Now
