= Darzin-e Yek =

Darzin-e Yek دارزين1
- Village
- Location within Iran
- Coordinates: 29°03′44″N 57°58′07″E
- Country: Iran
- Province: Kerman
- County: Bam
- Bakhsh: Central
- Rural District: Howmeh

Population (2006)
  - Total: 56
- Time zone: UTC+3:30 (IRST)
  - Summer (DST): UTC+4:30 (IRDT)

Darzin-e Yek (Persian: دارزين1, also Romanized as Dārzīn-e Yek; also known as Dārzīn) is a village in Howmeh Rural District, in the Central District of Bam County, Kerman Province, Iran. At the 2006 census, its population was 56, in 13 families.
