= Bidaran-e Kohneh =

Bidaran-e Kohneh بيدران كهنه
- Village
- Location within Iran
- Coordinates: 29°07′39″N 58°15′25″E
- Country: Iran
- Province: Kerman
- County: Bam
- Bakhsh: Central
- Rural District: Howmeh

Population (2006)
  - Total: 365
- Time zone: UTC+3:30 (IRST)
  - Summer (DST): UTC+4:30 (IRDT)

Bidaran-e Kohneh (Persian: بيدران كهنه, also Romanized as Bīdarān-e Kohneh; also known as Bīdarān and Bīderān) is a village in Howmeh Rural District, in the Central District of Bam County, Kerman Province, Iran. At the 2006 census, its population was 365, in 84 families.
