= Dehbid, Bam =

Village in Kerman province, Iran

Dehbid Persian: دهبيد
- Village
- Location within Iran
- Coordinates: 29°02′52″N 57°54′43″E
- Country: Iran
- Province: Kerman
- County: Bam
- District: Dehbakri
- Rural District: Dehbakri

Population (2016)
  - Total: 10,726
- Time zone: UTC+3:30 (IRST)

Dehbid (Persian: دهبيد) (Note: Formerly Dehbakri (دهبکري), also romanized as Deh Bakri and Deh Bakrī) is a village in Dehbakri Rural District of Dehbakri District, Bam County, Kerman province, Iran, serving as capital of both the district and the rural district.

== Demographics ==
=== Population ===
At the time of the 2006 National Census, the village's population was 5,008 in 1,262 households, when it was in the Central District. The following census in 2011 counted 8,175 people in 2,548 households. The 2016 census measured the population of the village as 10,726 people in 3,383 households. It was the most populous village in its rural district.

In 2018, the rural district was separated from the district in the formation of Dehbakri District, and the village of Dehbakri was renamed Dehbid as the new district's capital.
