= Ab Garmeh =

Ab Garmeh or Abgarmeh (Persian: آب گرمه) may refer to:

== Khuzestan Province ==
- Ab Garmeh, Lali, a village in Khuzestan Province, Iran

== Lorestan Province ==
- Ab Garmeh, Kuhdasht, a village in Lorestan Province, Iran
- Ab Garmeh-ye Bar Aftab, a village in Lorestan Province, Iran
- Ab Garmeh-ye Nesar, a village in Lorestan Province, Iran

== See also ==
- Abgarm (disambiguation)
- Ab Garmu (disambiguation)
