= Khvajeh Nezam-e Chahar Dang =

Khvajeh Nezam-e Chahar Dang خواجه نظام چهاردانگ
- Village
- Location within Iran
- Coordinates: 29°08′00″N 58°15′00″E
- Country: Iran
- Province: Kerman
- County: Bam
- Bakhsh: Central
- Rural District: Howmeh

Population (2006)
  - Total: 203
- Time zone: UTC+3:30 (IRST)
  - Summer (DST): UTC+4:30 (IRDT)

Khvajeh Nezam-e Chahar Dang (Persian: خواجه نظام چهاردانگ, also Romanized as Khvājeh Nez̧ām-e Chahār Dāng; also known as Khakenesun, Khāk Nezām, Khvājeh Nez̧ām, and Nez̧ām Vafā) is a village in Howmeh Rural District, in the Central District of Bam County, Kerman Province, Iran. At the 2006 census, its population was 203, in 49 families.
