= Abareq Rural District =

Rural district in Kerman province, Iran

Abareq Rural District Persian: دهستان ابارق
- Rural District
- Location within Iran
- Coordinates: 29°22′55″N 58°00′24″E
- Country: Iran
- Province: Kerman
- County: Bam
- District: Dehbakri
- Capital: Abareq
- Time zone: UTC+3:30 (IRST)

Abareq Rural District (Persian: دهستان ابارق) is in Dehbakri District of Bam County, Kerman province, Iran. Its capital is the village of Abareq, whose population at the time of the 2016 National Census was 4,568 in 1,264 households.

== History ==
In 2018, Dehbakri Rural District was separated from the Central District in the formation of Dehbakri District, and Abareq Rural District was created in the new district.
