= Darzin-e Do =

Darzin-e Do دارزين2
- Village
- Location within Iran
- Coordinates: 29°10′49″N 58°07′23″E
- Country: Iran
- Province: Kerman
- County: Bam
- Bakhsh: Central
- Rural District: Howmeh

Population (2006)
  - Total: 317
- Time zone: UTC+3:30 (IRST)
  - Summer (DST): UTC+4:30 (IRDT)

Darzin-e Do (Persian: دارزين2, also Romanized as Dārzīn-e Do; also known as Dārzeīn, Dārzīn, Drazīn, and Mehdīābād-e Dārzīn) is a village in Howmeh Rural District, in the Central District of Bam County, Kerman Province, Iran. At the 2006 census, its population was 317, in 83 families.
