= Kavaru, Bam =

Kavaru كوارو
- Village
- Location within Iran
- Coordinates: 29°06′18″N 57°56′24″E
- Country: Iran
- Province: Kerman
- County: Bam
- Bakhsh: Central
- Rural District: Deh Bakri

Population (2006)
  - Total: 16
- Time zone: UTC+3:30 (IRST)
  - Summer (DST): UTC+4:30 (IRDT)

Kavaru (Persian: كوارو, also Romanized as Kavārū; also known as Gabārū, Gabbārū, Gavārū, and Kabārū) is a village in Deh Bakri Rural District, in the Central District of Bam County, Kerman Province, Iran. At the 2006 census, its population was 16, in 4 families.
