= Putar =

Putar پوطار
- Village
- Location within Iran
- Coordinates: 29°00′09″N 58°03′06″E
- Country: Iran
- Province: Kerman
- County: Bam
- Bakhsh: Central
- Rural District: Howmeh

Population (2006)
  - Total: 33
- Time zone: UTC+3:30 (IRST)
  - Summer (DST): UTC+4:30 (IRDT)

Putar (Persian: پوطار, also Romanized as Pūţār and Pūtār; also known as Ābādī Seyyed, Ābādseyyed, Ābād Sīd, and Āb Garm-e Seyyedī) is a village in Howmeh Rural District, in the Central District of Bam County, Kerman Province, Iran. At the 2006 census, its population was 33, in 9 families.
