= Durdin =

Durdin may refer to:

- Đurđin, Serbia
- Durdin, Iran, a village in Kerman Province, Iran
