= Khvajeh Askar =

Village in Kerman province, Iran

Khvajeh Askar Persian: خواجه عسكر
- Village
- Location within Iran
- Coordinates: 29°07′07″N 58°15′44″E
- Country: Iran
- Province: Kerman
- County: Bam
- District: Central
- Rural District: Howmeh

Population (2016)
  - Total: 2,042
- Time zone: UTC+3:30 (IRST)

Khvajeh Askar (Persian: خواجه عسكر) (Note: Also romanized as Khvājeh ‘Askar; also known as Khājeh Asgar, Khvājeh ‘Asgar, and Khvājehī Askar) is a village in, and the capital of, Howmeh Rural District of the Central District of Bam County, Kerman province, Iran.

== Demographics ==
=== Population ===
At the time of the 2006 National Census, the village's population was 1,592 in 439 households. The following census in 2011 counted 2,135 people in 621 households. The 2016 census measured the population of the village as 2,042 people in 630 households.
