= Chenari =

Chenari may refer to:

- Chenari, India, a community development block and census town in Bihar
- Chenari (Vidhan Sabha constituency), India, a constituency of the Bihar Legislative Assembly
- Chenari, Bam, Iran, a village in Kerman Province
- Chenari, Nahavand, Iran, a village in Hamadan Province
