= Desk-e Bala =

Desk-e Bala دسك بالا
- Village
- Country: Iran
- Province: Kerman
- County: Bam
- Bakhsh: Central
- Rural District: Howmeh

Population (2006)
  - Total: 33
- Time zone: UTC+3:30 (IRST)
  - Summer (DST): UTC+4:30 (IRDT)

Desk-e Bala (Persian: دسك بالا, also Romanized as Desk-e Bālā) is a village in Howmeh Rural District, in the Central District of Bam County, Kerman Province, Iran. At the 2006 census, its population was 33, in 6 families.
