= Kavaru =

Kavaru may refer to:

- Kavaru, Estonia
- Kavaru, Bam, Iran
