= Desk, Bam =

Desk دسك
- Village
- Location within Iran
- Coordinates: 28°58′47″N 58°07′18″E
- Country: Iran
- Province: Kerman
- County: Bam
- Bakhsh: Central
- Rural District: Howmeh

Population (2006)
  - Total: 83
- Time zone: UTC+3:30 (IRST)
  - Summer (DST): UTC+4:30 (IRDT)

Desk (Persian: دسك) is a village in Howmeh Rural District, in the Central District of Bam County, Kerman Province, Iran. At the 2006 census, its population was 83, in 20 families.
