= Darijan Rural District =

Rural district in Kerman province, Iran

Darijan Rural District Persian: دهستان دریجان
- Rural District
- Location within Iran
- Coordinates: 29°01′34″N 58°07′26″E
- Country: Iran
- Province: Kerman
- County: Bam
- District: Central
- Capital: Darijan
- Time zone: UTC+3:30 (IRST)

Darijan Rural District (Persian: دهستان دریجان) is in the Central District of Bam County, Kerman province, Iran. Its capital is the village of Darijan, whose population at the time of the 2016 National Census was 787 in 283 households.

== History ==
Darijan Rural District was created in the Central District in 2018.
