= Bam, Iran =

City in Kerman province, Iran

Bam Persian: بم
- City
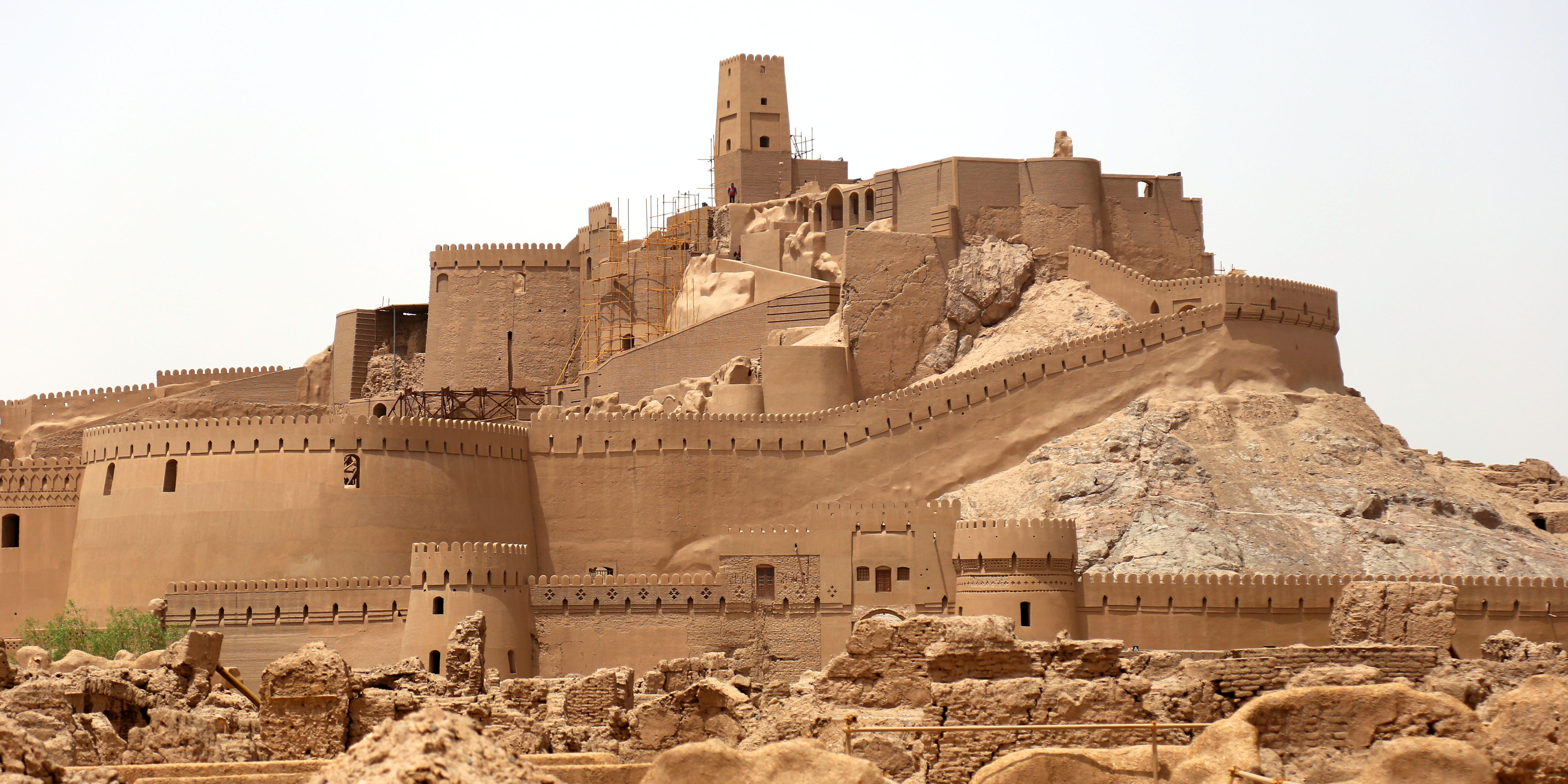
- The ancient citadel of Bam

- Location within Iran
- Coordinates: 29°05′58″N 58°20′37″E
- Country: Iran
- Province: Kerman
- County: Bam
- District: Central
- Elevation: 1,061 m (3,481 ft)

Population (2016)
  - Urban: 127,396
- Time zone: UTC+3:30 (IRST)

UNESCO World Heritage Site
- Official name: Bam and its Cultural Landscape
- Criteria: Cultural: ii, iii, iv, v
- Reference: 1208
- Inscription: 2004 (28th Session)
- Endangered: 2004–2013

Bam (Persian: بم) is a city in the Central District of Bam County, Kerman province, Iran, serving as capital of both the county and the district. The modern city surrounds the ancient citadel which has a history dating back to around 2,000 years ago. The citadel is a popular tourist attraction and a world heritage site. Before the 2003 earthquake, the official population count of the city was roughly 43,000.

== History ==
The ancient citadel of Arg-e Bam has a history dating back to the Parthian Empire (248 BC–224 AD), with many buildings built during the Safavid dynasty.

There are various opinions about the date and reasons for the foundation of the citadel. Economically and commercially, Bam occupied a very important place in the world and was famous for its textiles and clothes. Ibn Hawqal (943–977), a foreign traveller and geographer, wrote of Bam in his book Surat-ul-'Ard (The Earth-figure):

Over there they weave excellent, beautiful and long-lasting cotton cloths which are sent to places all over the world. There, they also make excellent clothes, each of which costs around 30 dinars; these are sold in Persian Khorasan, Iraq and Egypt.

The city was largely abandoned due to an Afghan invasion led by Mahmud Hotak in 1722. Subsequently, after the city had gradually been resettled, it was abandoned a second time due to an attack by invaders from Shiraz. It was also used for a time as an army barracks.

=== Modern history ===
The modern city of Bam has gradually developed as an agricultural and industrial centre, and until the 2003 earthquake was experiencing rapid growth. In particular, the city is known for its dates and citrus fruit, irrigated by a substantial network of qanats.

One of the most important agricultural products is Bam Mozafati dates, which is famous in Iran and other countries. Mozafati Bam dates have a delicate and rich taste, and are harvested every year in Darbam in mountainous Iran. No preservatives or chemical additives are added to it. It is a fresh, natural, raw and quality product.

The city also benefited from tourism, with an increasing number of people visiting the ancient citadel.

=== 2003 earthquake ===
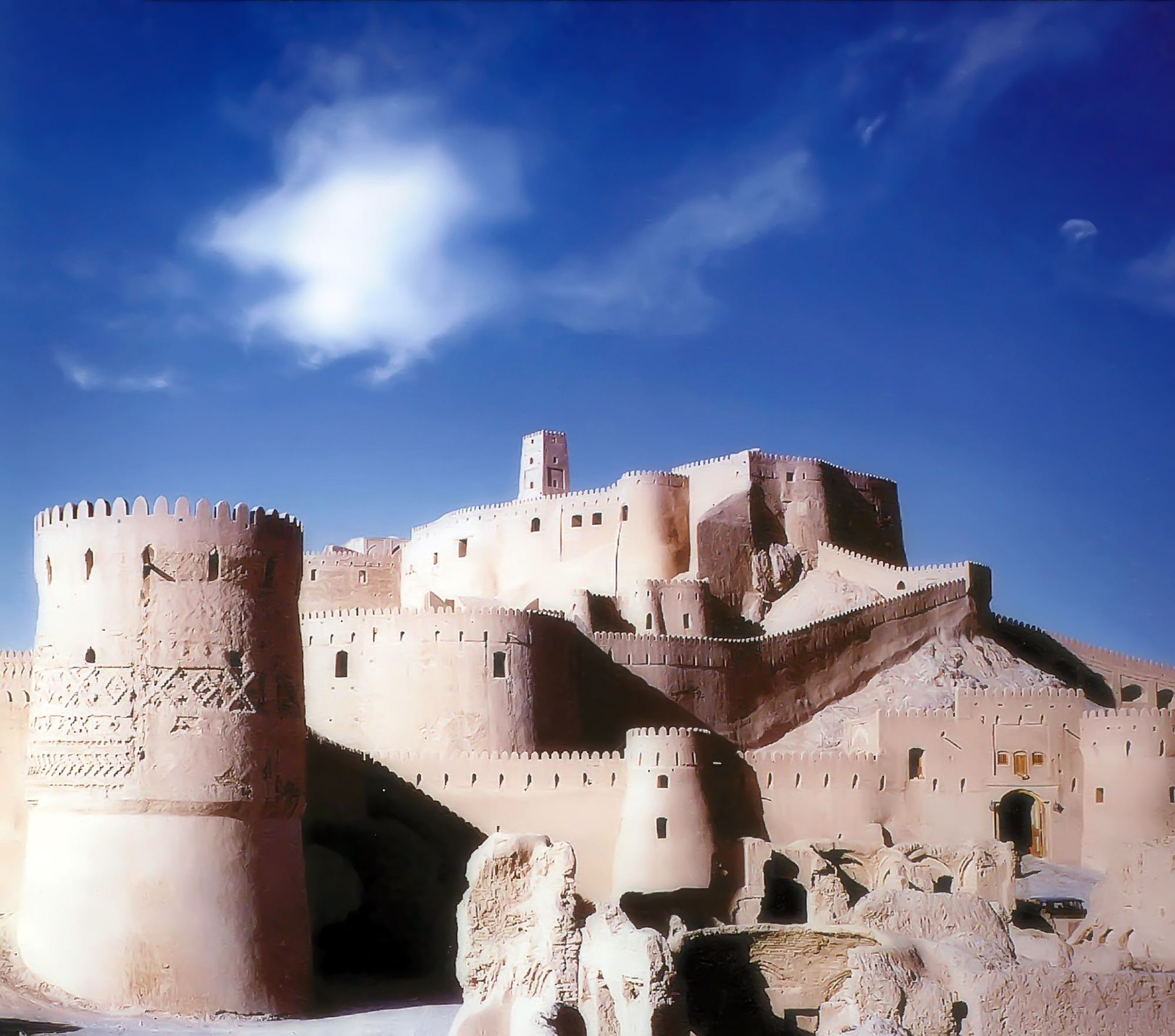
Arg-e Bam before the earthquake.

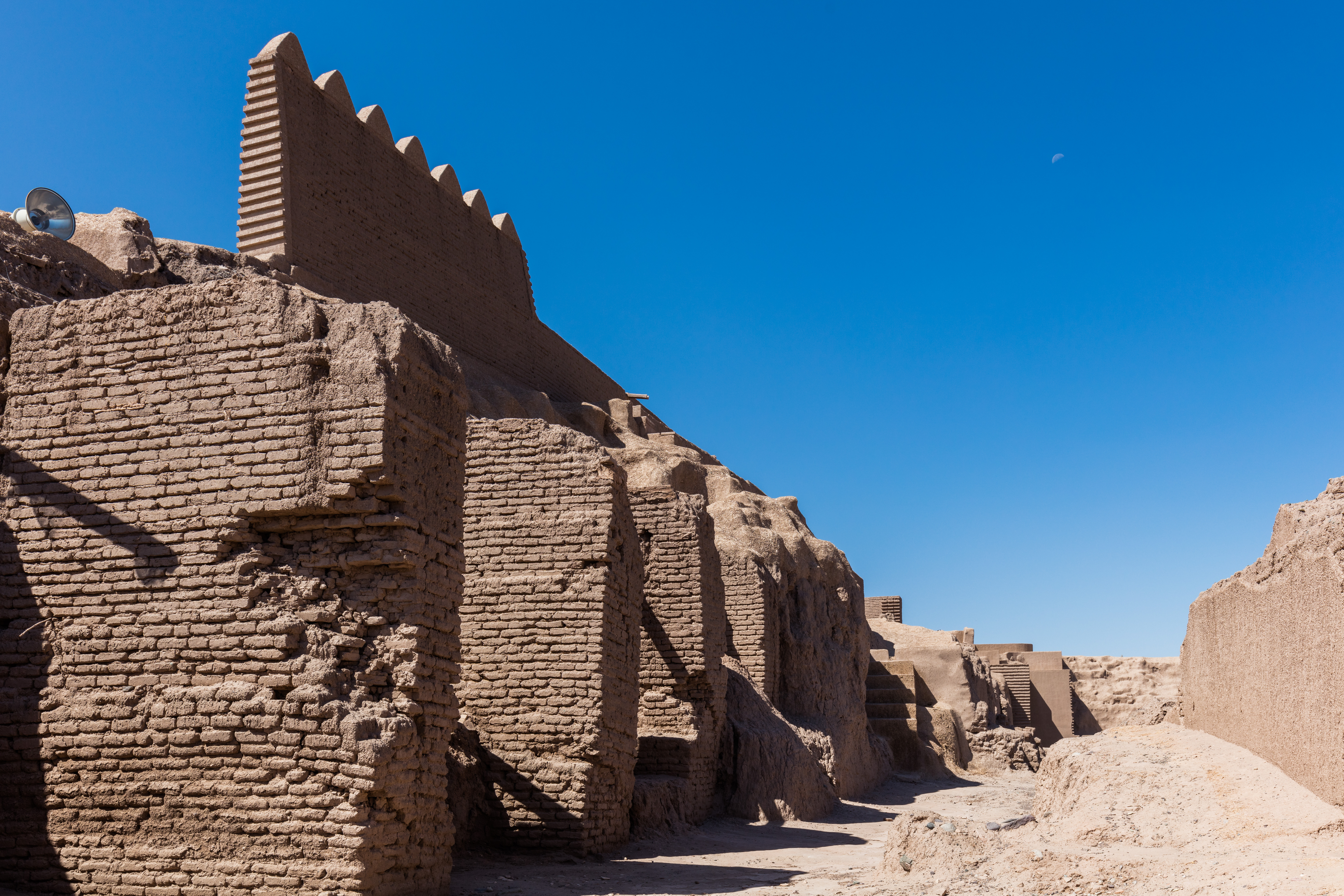
Bam in 2016

The 2003 Bam earthquake struck Bam and the surrounding Kerman province of south-eastern Iran at 01:56 UTC (5:26 AM Iran Standard Time) on 26 December 2003. The most widely accepted estimate for the magnitude of the earthquake is 6.6 on the moment magnitude scale (Mw), estimated by the United States Geological Survey. The earthquake was particularly destructive, with the death toll amounting to 26,271 people and injuring an additional 30,000. The effects of the earthquake were exacerbated by the fact that the city chiefly consisted of brick buildings, many of which did not comply with earthquake regulations set in Iran in 1989, and that most of the inhabitants were indoors and asleep at the time the main tremor struck.

After the earthquake, relations between the United States and Iran temporarily thawed. The U.S. offered direct humanitarian assistance to Iran and in return, the Iranian government promised to comply with an agreement with the International Atomic Energy Agency which supports greater monitoring of its nuclear interests. In total a reported 44 countries sent in personnel to assist in relief operations and 60 countries offered assistance and support.

=== Post-2003 development ===
Immediately following the earthquake, the Iranian government began to plan a new city based on population control theories in order to eliminate problems that existed with the old city. The development of the plan took at least six months and resulted in significant complaints against the central government and local government by the Bam earthquake survivors. Nevertheless, the government carried on its plans and currently the city is being rebuilt. The historic citadel is also being rebuilt with specialist care from the Ministry of Culture and from Japanese universities. The earthquake stalled the growth of Bam as a city, especially as about half of its residents were killed and most of the remainder were hurt. Costs of the earthquake mounted to between $700 million and $1 billion U.S. dollars.

=== 2007 Sandstorm ===
On 16 March 2007 a 130 km/h (81 mph) sandstorm hit the city of Bam without warning, suffocating three children, killing two in car accidents, and injuring 14 others.

== Demographics ==
=== Population ===
At the time of the 2006 National Census, the city's population was 73,823 in 19,572 households. The following census in 2011 counted 107,131 people in 29,433 households. The 2016 census measured the population of the city as 127,396 people in 39,043 households.

== Climate ==
Bam has a desert climate (Köppen climate classification BWh) with long, hot summers and mild, short winters. The average annual rainfall is around 60 mm.

Climate data for Bam (1991-2020)
Month	Jan	Feb	Mar	Apr	May	Jun	Jul	Aug	Sep	Oct	Nov	Dec	Year
Record high °C (°F)	30.5 (86.9)	33.2 (91.8)	39.0 (102.2)	41.0 (105.8)	44.9 (112.8)	47.6 (117.7)	48.6 (119.5)	47.4 (117.3)	43.6 (110.5)	40.0 (104.0)	36.6 (97.9)	34.8 (94.6)	48.6 (119.5)
Mean daily maximum °C (°F)	17.3 (63.1)	20.5 (68.9)	25.3 (77.5)	31.1 (88.0)	36.3 (97.3)	40.1 (104.2)	40.7 (105.3)	39.0 (102.2)	36.2 (97.2)	31.0 (87.8)	23.9 (75.0)	18.9 (66.0)	30.0 (86.0)
Daily mean °C (°F)	11.2 (52.2)	14.3 (57.7)	19.0 (66.2)	24.9 (76.8)	30.2 (86.4)	34.2 (93.6)	35.0 (95.0)	33.2 (91.8)	29.9 (85.8)	24.5 (76.1)	17.5 (63.5)	12.6 (54.7)	23.9 (75.0)
Mean daily minimum °C (°F)	6.1 (43.0)	8.8 (47.8)	13.4 (56.1)	18.9 (66.0)	23.9 (75.0)	27.9 (82.2)	29.0 (84.2)	27.2 (81.0)	23.8 (74.8)	18.9 (66.0)	12.3 (54.1)	7.4 (45.3)	18.1 (64.6)
Record low °C (°F)	−9.0 (15.8)	−5.0 (23.0)	−3.0 (26.6)	4.0 (39.2)	9.5 (49.1)	18.0 (64.4)	19.0 (66.2)	15.0 (59.0)	11.0 (51.8)	6.0 (42.8)	−2.0 (28.4)	−7.0 (19.4)	−9.0 (15.8)
Average precipitation mm (inches)	8.7 (0.34)	9.9 (0.39)	13.4 (0.53)	9.1 (0.36)	5.7 (0.22)	0.7 (0.03)	0.4 (0.02)	0.2 (0.01)	0.1 (0.00)	1.9 (0.07)	1.8 (0.07)	5.1 (0.20)	57.0 (2.24)
Average precipitation days (≥ 1.0 mm)	1.6	2.0	2.5	1.7	1.0	0.2	0.1	0.1	0.0	0.6	0.5	0.9	11.2
Average relative humidity (%)	41	35	31	25	19	15	14	14	16	22	31	37	25
Average dew point °C (°F)	−2.9 (26.8)	−2.3 (27.9)	−0.5 (31.1)	1.7 (35.1)	2.8 (37.0)	2.5 (36.5)	3.0 (37.4)	1.7 (35.1)	0.2 (32.4)	0.1 (32.2)	−1.3 (29.7)	−3.2 (26.2)	0.2 (32.3)
Mean monthly sunshine hours	219	205	223	249	292	314	326	319	284	269	238	225	3,163
Source 1: NOAA NCEI
Source 2: Iran Meteorological Organization (records)

Climate data for Bam 1067m (1956–2010)
Month	Jan	Feb	Mar	Apr	May	Jun	Jul	Aug	Sep	Oct	Nov	Dec	Year
Record high °C (°F)	30.0 (86.0)	33.2 (91.8)	39.0 (102.2)	41.0 (105.8)	44.6 (112.3)	47.6 (117.7)	48.6 (119.5)	47.4 (117.3)	43.6 (110.5)	40.0 (104.0)	36.6 (97.9)	32.0 (89.6)	48.6 (119.5)
Mean daily maximum °C (°F)	16.5 (61.7)	19.7 (67.5)	24.7 (76.5)	30.2 (86.4)	35.3 (95.5)	39.2 (102.6)	39.6 (103.3)	38.2 (100.8)	35.4 (95.7)	30.6 (87.1)	23.8 (74.8)	18.4 (65.1)	29.3 (84.7)
Daily mean °C (°F)	10.7 (51.3)	13.6 (56.5)	18.5 (65.3)	23.8 (74.8)	28.8 (83.8)	32.8 (91.0)	33.6 (92.5)	32.0 (89.6)	28.9 (84.0)	24.0 (75.2)	17.5 (63.5)	12.4 (54.3)	23.0 (73.4)
Mean daily minimum °C (°F)	4.8 (40.6)	7.6 (45.7)	12.3 (54.1)	17.4 (63.3)	22.4 (72.3)	26.4 (79.5)	27.6 (81.7)	25.8 (78.4)	22.3 (72.1)	17.4 (63.3)	11.2 (52.2)	6.4 (43.5)	16.8 (62.2)
Record low °C (°F)	−9.0 (15.8)	−5.0 (23.0)	−3.0 (26.6)	4.0 (39.2)	9.5 (49.1)	18.0 (64.4)	19.0 (66.2)	15.0 (59.0)	11.0 (51.8)	6.0 (42.8)	−2.0 (28.4)	−7.0 (19.4)	−9.0 (15.8)
Average precipitation mm (inches)	12.0 (0.47)	8.9 (0.35)	12.2 (0.48)	9.7 (0.38)	5.5 (0.22)	0.6 (0.02)	0.9 (0.04)	0.6 (0.02)	0.2 (0.01)	0.9 (0.04)	2.2 (0.09)	5.1 (0.20)	58.8 (2.31)
Average precipitation days (≥ 1.0 mm)	2.1	1.8	2.7	2.3	1.1	0.2	0.1	0.1	0.1	0.4	0.6	1.2	12.7
Average snowy days	0.4	0.1	0.0	0.0	0.0	0.0	0.0	0.0	0.0	0.0	0.0	0.2	0.7
Average relative humidity (%)	46	41	36	31	26	21	21	21	22	27	34	42	30
Mean monthly sunshine hours	234.1	223.8	239.5	258.3	311.2	331.4	338.4	336.8	306.6	296.8	260.4	240.2	3,377.5
Source: Iran Meteorological Organization (records), (temperatures), (precipitation), (humidity), (days with precipitation), (sunshine)

== Universities ==
=== Bam University ===
Bam University is a prestigious academic institution that offers undergraduate courses in this university.

=== Bam University of Medical Sciences ===
Bam Medical University is one of the most important universities in this city.

=== Islamic Azad University, Bam branch ===
Islamic Azad University Bam branch, is considered one of the most prestigious universities in Bam.

== See also ==
Media related to Bam, Iran at Wikimedia Commons

Bam travel guide from Wikivoyage
