= Hasharabad, Rigan =

Hasharabad حشراباد
- Village
- Location within Iran
- Coordinates: 28°41′09″N 59°02′19″E
- Country: Iran
- Province: Kerman
- County: Rigan
- Bakhsh: Central
- Rural District: Rigan

Population (2006)
  - Total: 412
- Time zone: UTC+3:30 (IRST)
  - Summer (DST): UTC+4:30 (IRDT)

Hasharabad (Persian: حشراباد, also Romanized as Ḩasharābād) is a village in Rigan Rural District, in the Central District of Rigan County, Kerman Province, Iran. At the 2006 census, its population was 412, in 98 families.
