= Ab-e Garm, Ganjabad =

Ab-e Garm ابگرم
- Village
- Location within Iran
- Coordinates: 28°18′15″N 57°36′35″E
- Country: Iran
- Province: Kerman
- County: Anbarabad
- Bakhsh: Esmaili
- Rural District: Ganjabad

Population (2006)
  - Total: 33
- Time zone: UTC+3:30 (IRST)
  - Summer (DST): UTC+4:30 (IRDT)

Ab-e Garm (Persian: ابگرم, also Romanized as Āb-e Garm; also known as Ab Garm Nazdike Bahram Abad) is a village in Ganjabad Rural District, Esmaili District, Anbarabad County, Kerman province, Iran. At the 2006 census, its population was 33, in 6 families.
