= Arg-e Bam =

Ancient fortress and largest adobe building in the world, Iran

UNESCO World Heritage Site
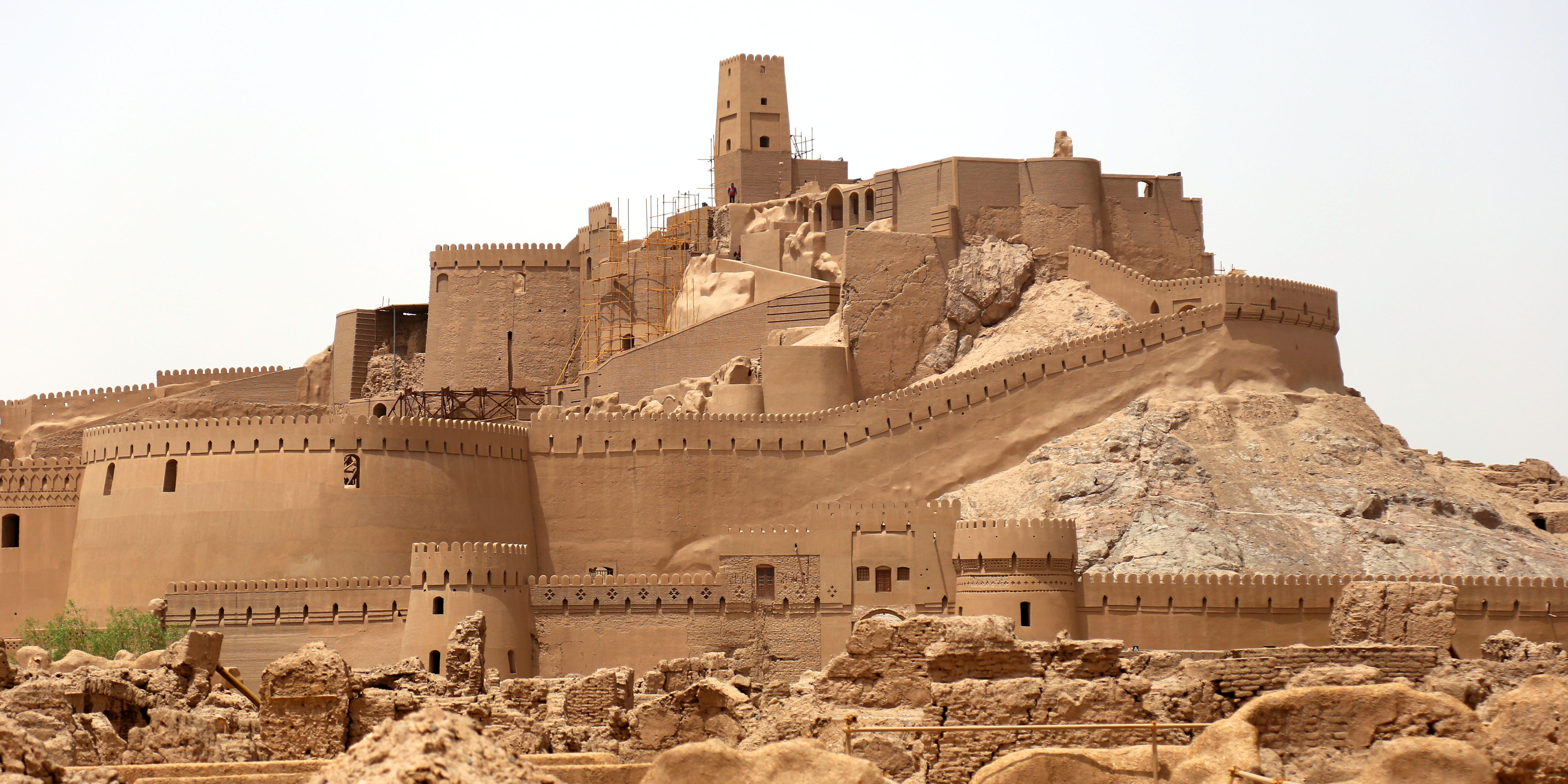

- Location within Iran Location within West and Central Asia
- Location: Bam, Iran
- Part of: Bam and its Cultural Landscape
- Criteria: Cultural: ii, iii, iv, v
- Reference: 1208
- Inscription: 2004 (28th Session)
- Endangered: 2004–2013
- Coordinates: 29°07′01″N 58°22′07″E

The Bam Citadel before and after the 2003 earthquake

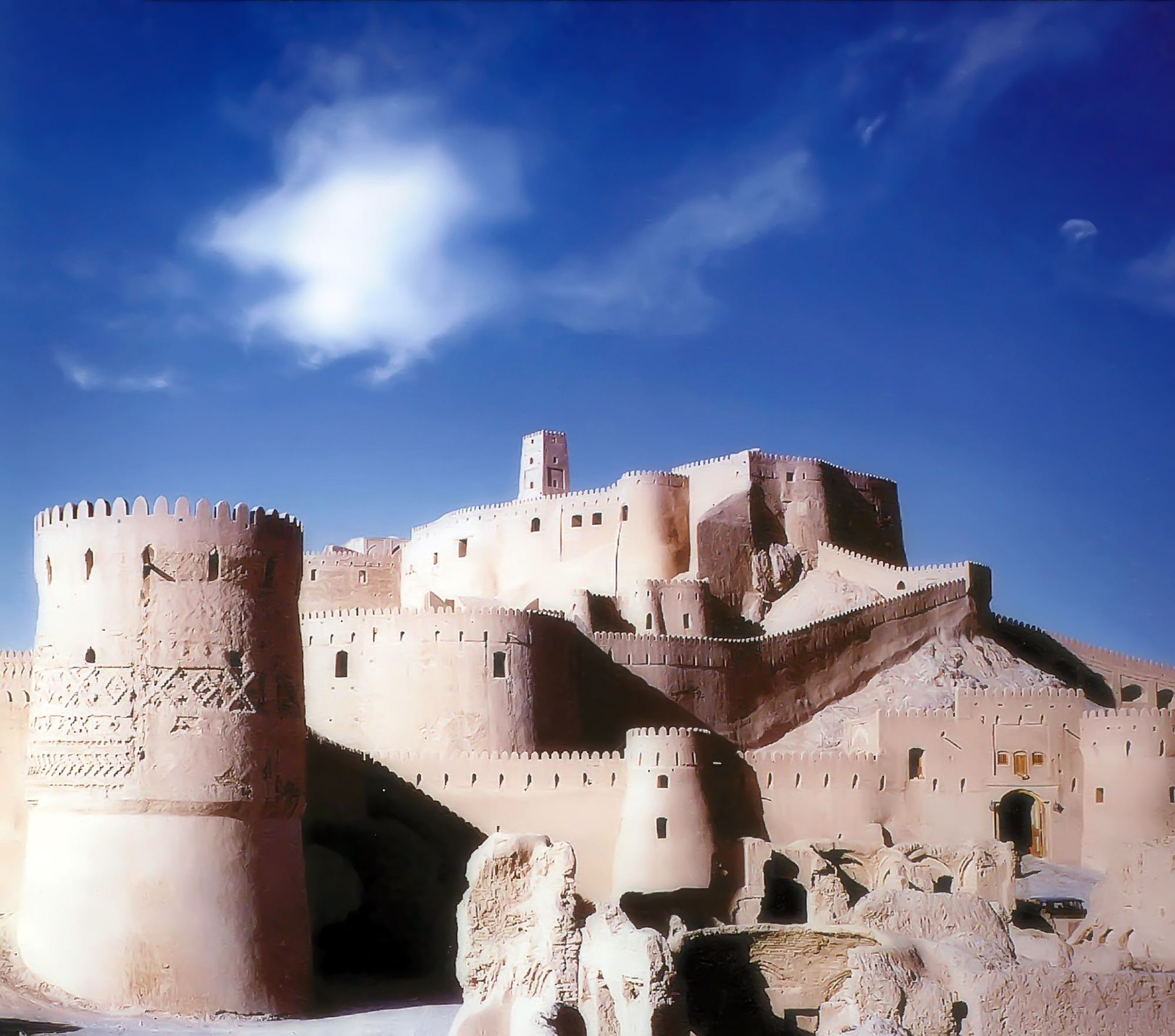
Before the earthquake

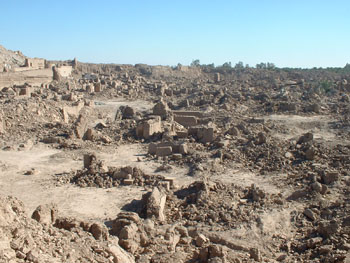
After the earthquake

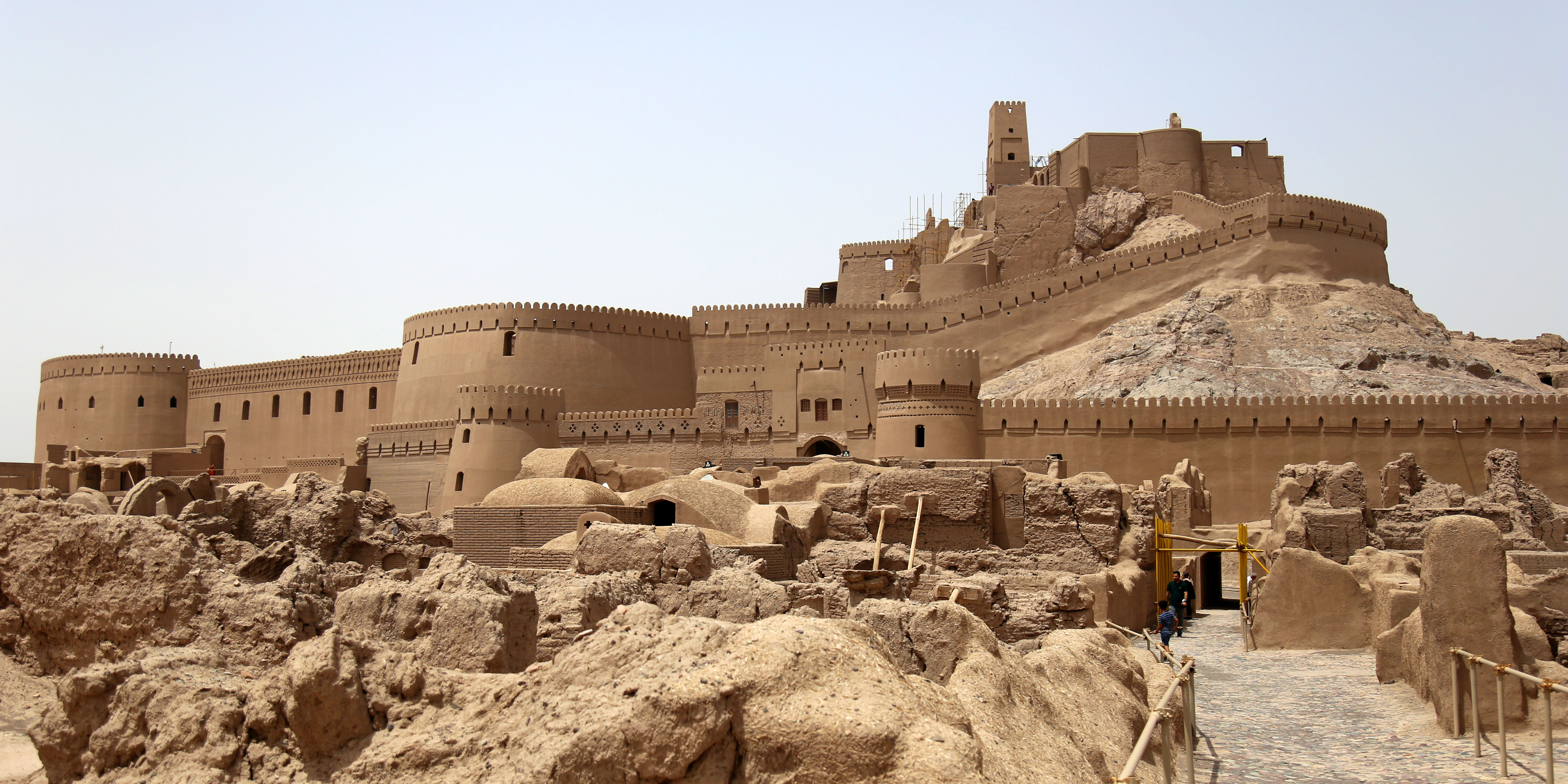
After the reconstruction (image from May 2022)

The Arg-e Bam (Persian: ارگ بم), located in the city of Bam, Kerman province of southeastern Iran, is the largest adobe building in the world. The entire building was a large fortress containing the citadel, but because the citadel dominates the ruins, the entire fortress is now named Bam Citadel.

Listed by UNESCO as part of the World Heritage Site "Bam and its Cultural Landscape", it can be traced back to at least the Achaemenid Empire (sixth to fourth centuries BC). The citadel rose to importance from the seventh to eleventh centuries, as a crossroads along the Silk Road and other important trade routes, and as a producer of silk and cotton garments.

On 26 December 2003, the citadel was almost completely destroyed by an earthquake, along with much of the rest of Bam and its environs. A few days after the earthquake, the President of Iran, Mohammad Khatami, announced that the citadel would be rebuilt.

== History ==
There is no precise archaeological dating of the buildings of the Citadel of Bam.

During the Parthian era, the fort was expanded and became Arg-e Bam, the Citadel of Bam. A comparative study, titled “Bam and a Brief History of Urban Settlement and Planning in Iran”, concluded that the essential core of the city of Bam and the Governor’s section were built during the Parthian era. Under the Sassanids, the castle was seized by Ardeshir Babakan. New fortifications and walls were constructed between 224 and 637 AD.

In 645 AD, the Kerman region was conquered by the Arabs, and Arg-e-Bam probably suffered damage during the war. One of the Arab commanders established the Al Rasoul mosque, one of the first mosques built in Iran in the early Islamic era. In 656 AD, the Khawarij, a group of Muslims defeated by Ali, escaped to Kerman and Bam where they settled in the Arg-e-Bam. In 869 AD, Ya'qub ibn al-Layth al-Saffar who was fighting the Abbasids, defeated the Khawarij and took over Arg-e-Bam. It then became his permanent base camp.

The name of Bam is mentioned for the first time by Islamic writers in the 10th century. According to these authors, Bam was then a well established market place surrounded by a wide agricultural area. The city was famous for its elegant and tasteful cotton fabrics, its supposedly impregnable fortress, its busy bazaars, and its palm trees.

After the Mongol invasion of Iran, Bam and the Kerman region were turned over to the Qarakhataian dynasty, who ruled the region from 1240 to 1363 AD. Bam benefited from a strategic location on the spice route, connecting the region to the Silk Road. The city was renowned for silkworm breeding and a flourishing silk industry.

During the Safavid era, from 1502 to 1722, Iran went through a period of relative calm and stability. Arg-e-Bam was considerably developed, as well as the rest of the country. The Four Seasons Palace was built during this period. Towards the end of Safavid rule, Arg-e-Bam was conquered by the founder of the Qajar dynasty, Agha Mohammad Khan Qajar, who used the citadel as a strategic point to fend off Afghan and Baluchi incursions and thus, turned it into a military complex.

In 1839, Aga Khan I, Imam of the Nizari Ismaili sect, rose up against Mohammad Shah Qajar and took refuge in Arg-e-Bam, until Prince Firuz Mirza, who was later to be known as Farman Farma (the Ruler of Rulers), arrested him. The increasing military presence within the walls of Arg-e-Bam gradually led people to settle outside the limits of the ramparts. In 1880, Firuz Mirza wrote that only military personnel were residing within the citadel area and he suggested that the old and abandoned city sitting at the foot of the citadel be demolished and the area turned into a garden. In 1900, the construction of the new city of Bam began and people progressively left the old Bam.

The citadel was used as a garrison until 1932; however, since then, the garrison and old city have been abandoned. In 1953, the site became recognized as a nationally significant historic site, and a gradual process of conservation and restoration began; however, most of the work was carried out from 1973 onwards.

After the Islamic Revolution, Arg-e-Bam was placed under the responsibility of the Cultural Heritage Organization of Iran (ICHO). In 1993, the citadel was designated as one of the most significant projects of the Cultural Heritage Organization.

== Citadel design and architecture ==
The citadel is situated in the center of the fortress-city, on the point with the widest view, for security.

All buildings are made of non-baked clay bricks, i.e. adobe. Prior to the 2003 earthquake, Bam Citadel was most likely the largest adobe structure in the world.

In 1976, the Citadel was used as the major location site for Valerio Zurlini's film, The Desert of the Tartars.

== Description of the citadel ==
The citadel consists of four main sections: a residential zone, the stables, the army barracks, and the governor’s residence.

Arg-e-Bam had 38 watchtowers and four entrance gates. The outer defense wall is surrounded by a moat. The Government Quarters are on a rocky hill, protected by a double fortification wall. The most notable structures are the bazaar, the Congregational Mosque, the Mirza Na’im ensemble, and the Mir House.

== Dimensions ==
Larger than the nearby Rayen Castle, the area of Bam Citadel is approximately 180,000 square meters (44 acres) and is surrounded by gigantic walls, 6–7 metres (20–23 ft) high and 1,815 metres (5,955 ft) long.

== 2003 earthquake ==
On 26 December 2003, at 5:26 am, Bam was struck by a major earthquake. The United States Geological Survey estimated its magnitude at 6.6, on the Richter scale. It also had a vertical acceleration of 1G. About 142,000 people were living in the Bam area, at the time. The extremely destructive quake killed about 26,200, injured thousands, and left more than 75,000 homeless. Approximately 70% of the buildings were destroyed. The earthquake was wrenching because its hypocenter was located just below the city of Bam, around 7 km deep.

The Bam area has an underground base consisting of a series of faults. The main one, called Bam Fault, had been inactive for a very long time. Though the earthquake was on the southern part of Bam, the main direction of the horizontal motion of the waves was east–west and was perpendicular to the direction of the main fault located around 3 km East of Bam. It seems that the Bam Fault channeled the energy of the earthquake in its direction, north–south, but at the same time, it acted like a boomerang or amplifier by sending back the energy on an east–west direction.

This was noted on the various sites where buildings which were mostly ruined had their main axis oriented north–south (Arg-e-Bam, Bam and the villages on the East of Bam). Therefore, they could not withstand the waves coming from the East (Bam) or West (villages east of Bam) and perpendicular to them.

Buildings that had their main axis oriented east–west were in the same direction of the seismic waves and they responded much better; some of their parts were damaged, but they were not totally ruined. They also presented the typical shear cracks when the ground motion is in the direction of the wall plane.

The structures that had been maintained and repeatedly modified or expanded over time fared much worse than did the ancient structures that had not been maintained, modified, or restored. The same intriguing phenomenon could be observed on the structures partially or entirely strengthened and restored during the late 20th century.

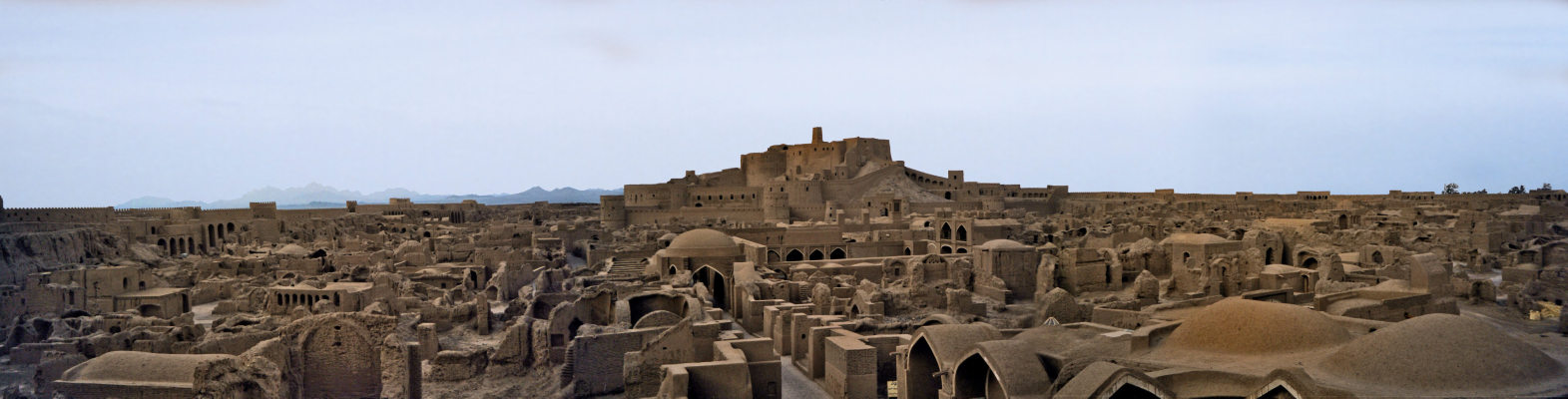
The citadel of Arg-e Bam

== Consequences of the earthquake ==
Video showing the reconstruction

The citadel, including the governor’s residence, the main tower, the Chahar Fasl (Four Seasons) turret, and the hammam, were nearly totally destroyed, especially because of their location on top of the hill. The rocky hill concentrated the energy of the earthquake. In addition, these buildings collapsed because their foundations were resting on inhomogeneous ground, made of rocks and earth filling. The earth filling slipped with the ground motion. The city at the foot of the castle was nearly flattened, especially the parts that previously had been restored. Most of the vaulted roofs were cracked or severely damaged.

No restoration had been undertaken for the Konariha quarter, before the earthquake. It was already severely ruined, and there were just a few structures left, of eroded vaults and domes. Paradoxically, this part of the city had less damage than the part which had been restored, though the ramparts all around collapsed. Only a few walls collapsed and some remnants, of already broken vaulted roofs, fell down.

No restoration had been undertaken either for the Zoroastrian temple, just behind Arg-e-Bam, or the Khale Dokhtar citadel, 2 km North of Arg-e-Bam. Before the earthquake, they already were severely ruined and the earthquake did not damage them, as much as the restored city of Arg-e-Bam. The Khale Dokhtar citadel did not have many vaulted roofs left, before the earthquake. The main damage was a tower, and some additional debris from previously collapsed vaults and domes. The Khale Dokhtar citadel can be traced back to the Sassanid Period, and is believed to be older than Arg-e-Bam.

Three kilometers east of Arg-e-Bam are the Summer Pavilion, Kushk Rahim Abad, and an old caravanserai. Both were not damaged further by the earthquake. The summer pavilion was already severely ruined before the earthquake. The old caravanserai had been abandoned long ago, and some of its parts had previously collapsed. In fact, the earthquake damaged this caravanserai very little, compared to the average situation in Arg-e-Bam, Bam, and the villages further east. The reason seemed that it was well built with sound details, compared to the average building quality of the area.

== Post-2003 restoration efforts ==
As of January 2026, Arg-e Bam remains under continuous restoration efforts. The city of Bam itself continues to lack crucial infrastructure; having unpaved roads, many areas that have not been dredged, and blocked waterways.

== Gallery ==
Arg-e Bam

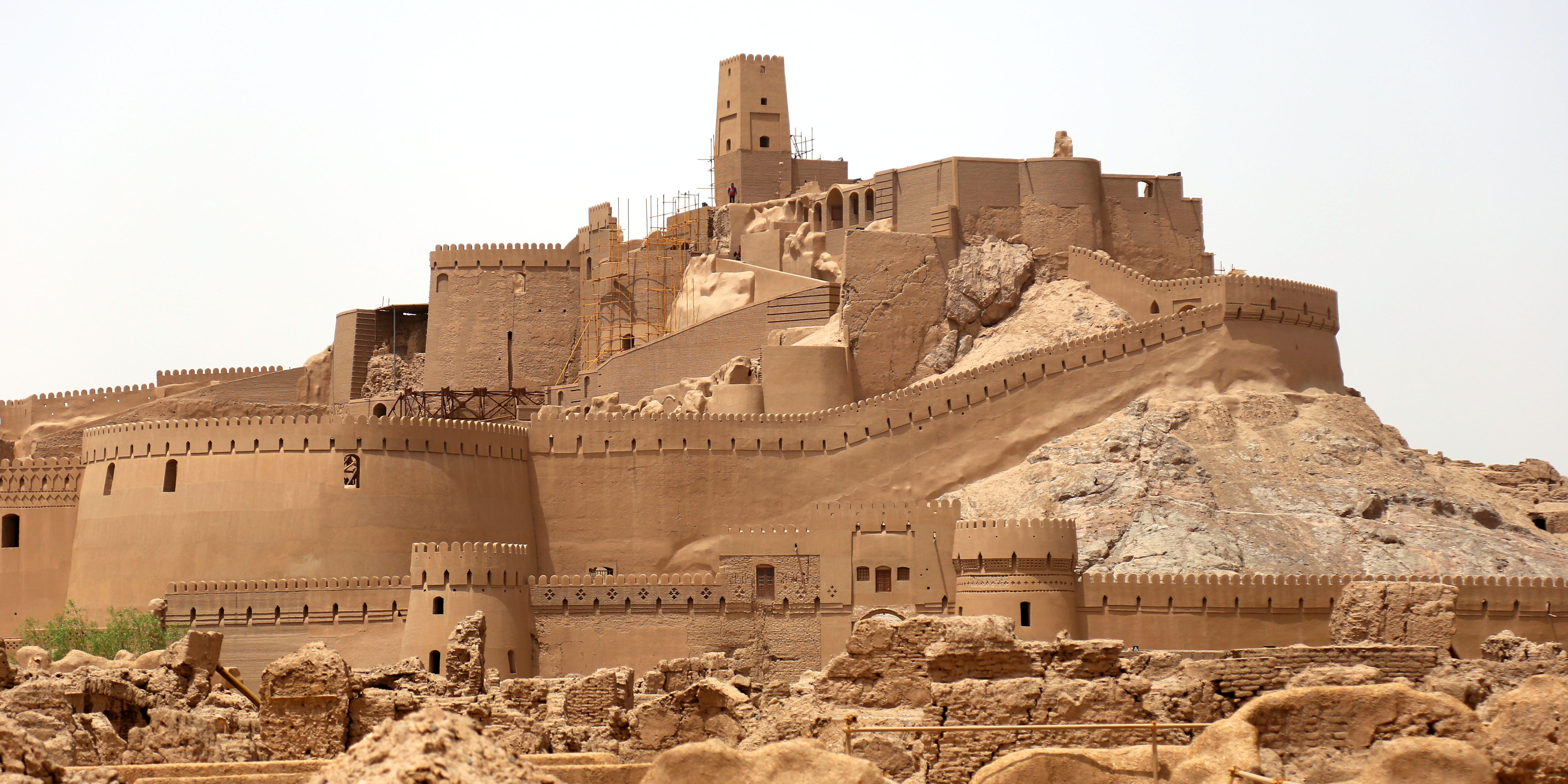

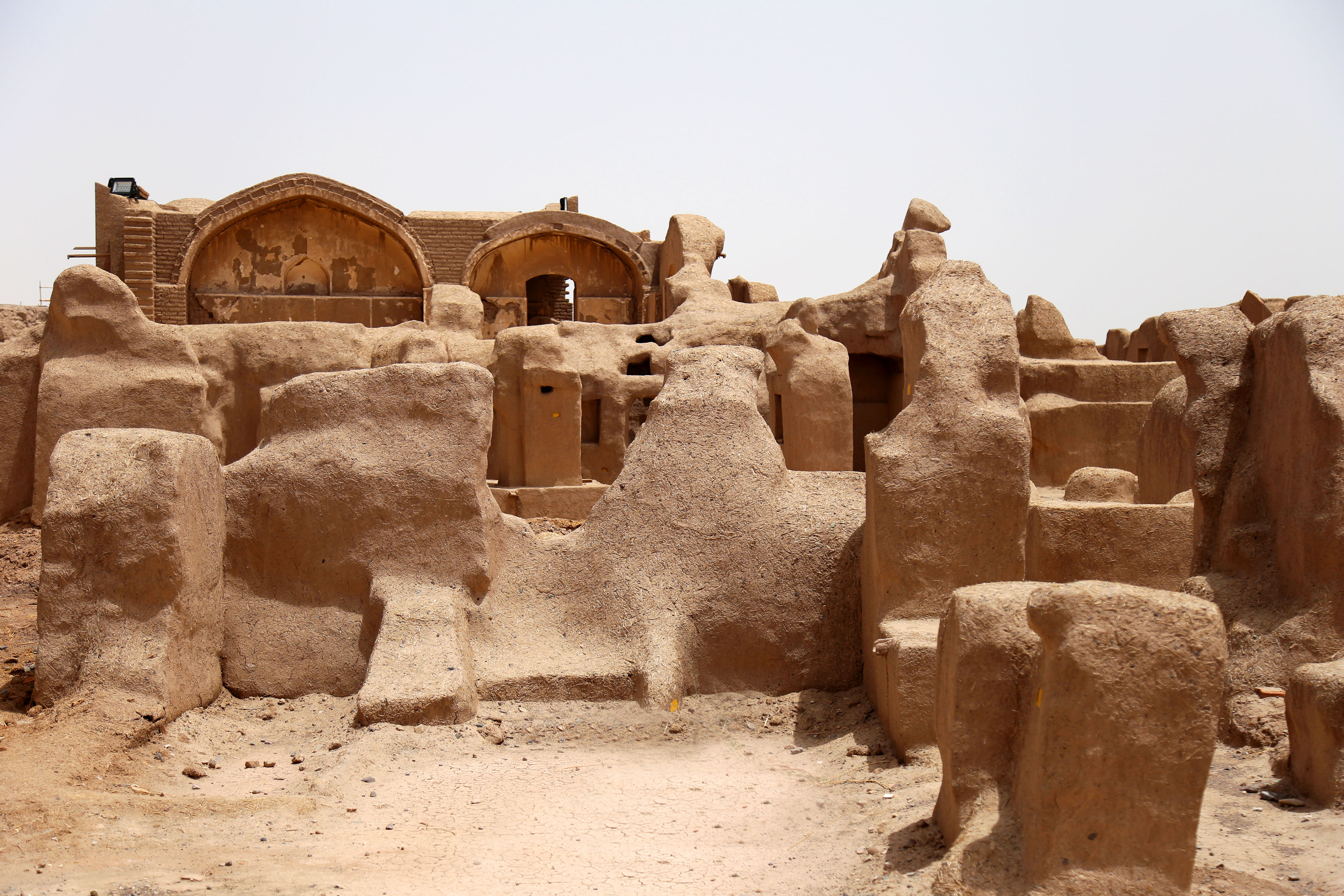

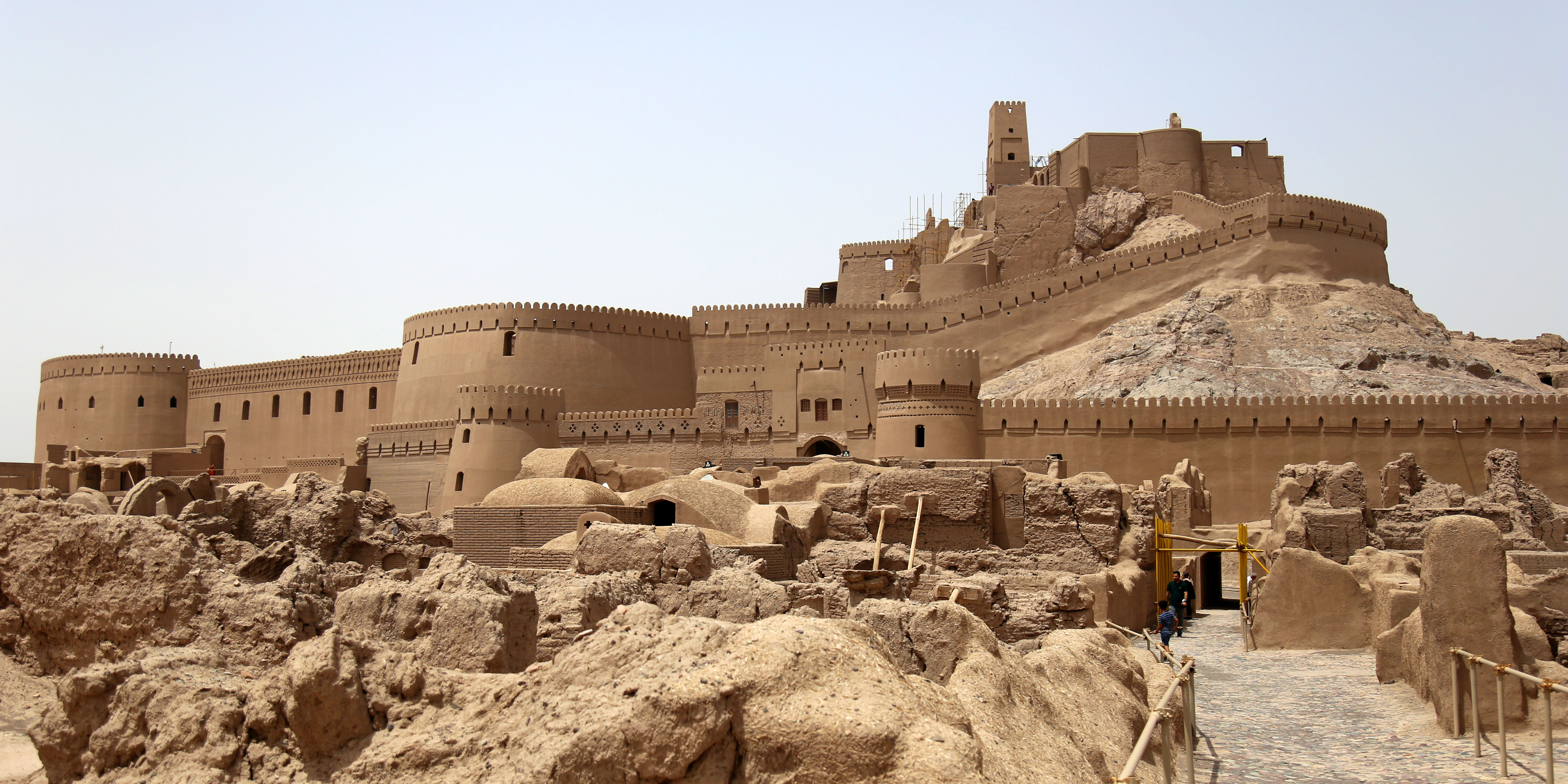

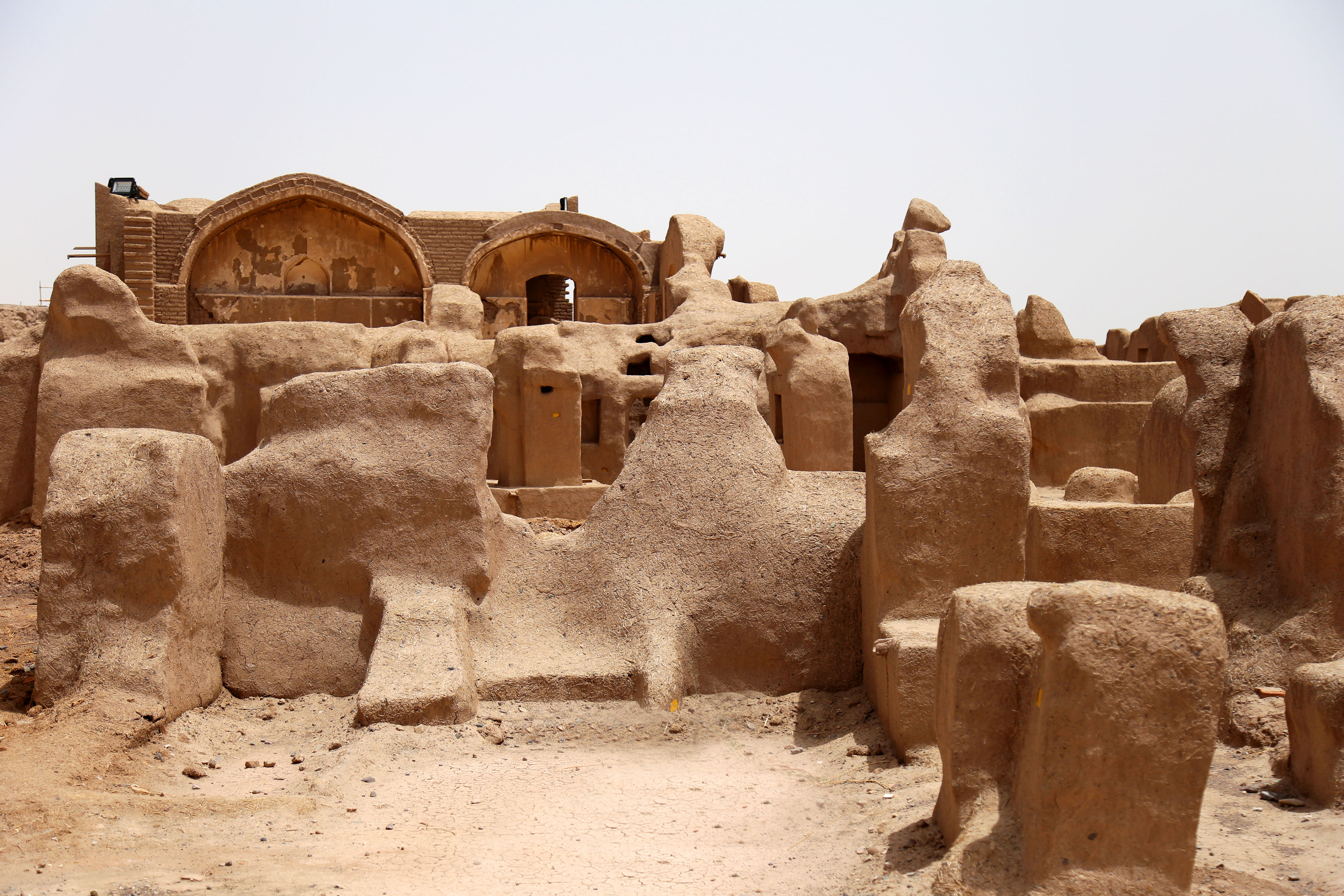

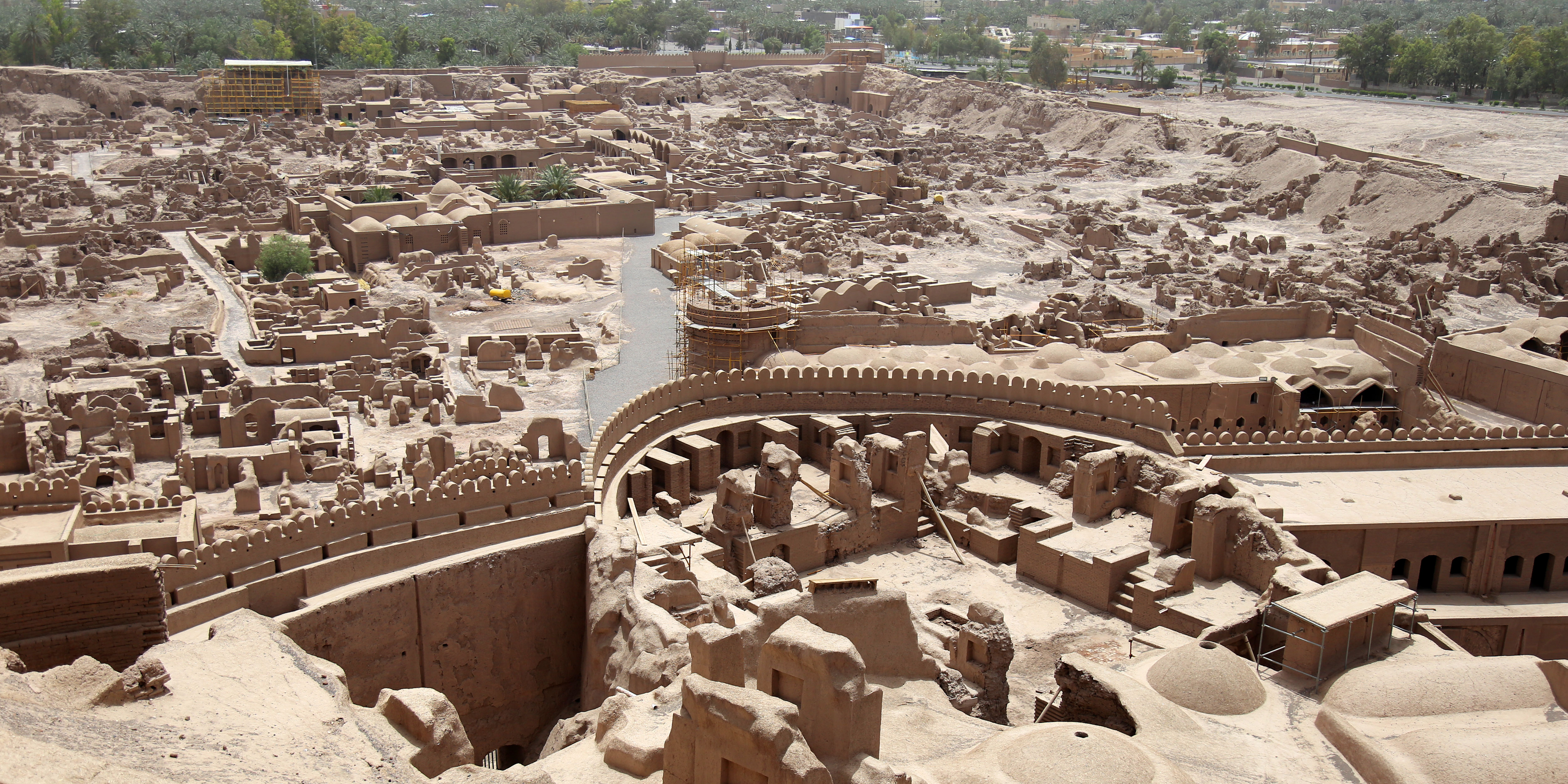

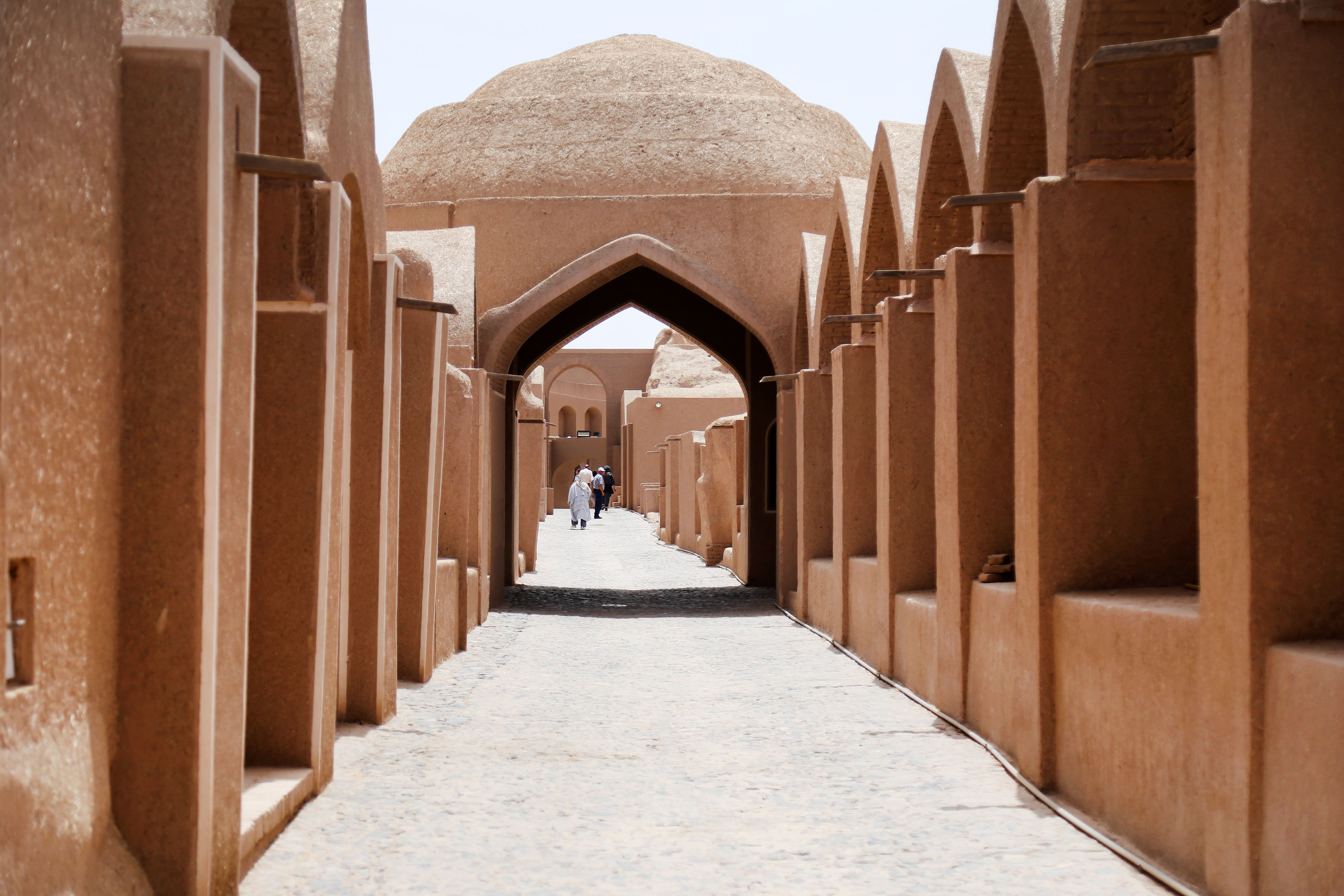

== See also ==
- List of Iranian castles
- Iranian architecture
- List of World Heritage Sites in Iran
