= Abgarm, Marvdasht =

Abgarm ابگرم
- Village
- Location within Iran
- Coordinates: 30°00′00″N 52°41′17″E
- Country: Iran
- Province: Fars
- County: Marvdasht
- Bakhsh: Central
- Rural District: Ramjerd-e Yek

Population (2006)
  - Total: 98
- Time zone: UTC+3:30 (IRST)
  - Summer (DST): UTC+4:30 (IRDT)

Abgarm (Persian: ابگرم, also Romanized as Ābgarm; also known as Āb Garm-e Bozorg) is a village in Ramjerd-e Yek Rural District, in the Central District of Marvdasht County, Fars province, Iran. At the 2006 census, its population was 98, in 18 families.
