= Hasharabad, Jiroft =

Hasharabad حشراباد
- Village
- Location within Iran
- Coordinates: 28°33′28″N 57°44′28″E
- Country: Iran
- Province: Kerman
- County: Jiroft
- Bakhsh: Central
- Rural District: Khatunabad

Population (2006)
  - Total: 602
- Time zone: UTC+3:30 (IRST)
  - Summer (DST): UTC+4:30 (IRDT)

Hasharabad (Persian: حشراباد, also Romanized as Ḩasharābād) is a village in Khatunabad Rural District, in the Central District of Jiroft County, Kerman Province, Iran. At the 2006 census, its population was 602, in 100 families.
