= Dehbakri District =

District in Kerman province, Iran

Dehbakri District Persian: بخش دهبکری
- District
- Location within Iran
- Coordinates: 29°18′46″N 58°00′24″E
- Country: Iran
- Province: Kerman
- County: Bam
- Capital: Dehbid
- Time zone: UTC+3:30 (IRST)

Dehbakri District (Persian: بخش دهبکری) is in Bam County, Kerman province, Iran. Its capital is the village of Dehbid, (Note: Formerly Dehbakri) whose population at the time of the 2016 National Census was 10,726 people in 3,383 households.

== History ==
In 2018, Dehbakri Rural District was separated from the Central District in the formation of Dehbakri District. The village of Dehbakri was renamed Dehbid as the capital of the new district.

== Demographics ==
=== Administrative divisions ===
Dehbakri District
Administrative Divisions
Abareq RD
Dehbakri RD
RD = Rural District
