= Khvajeh Aur =

Khvajeh Aur خواجه عور
- Village
- Location within Iran
- Coordinates: 37°24′17″N 47°01′41″E
- Country: Iran
- Province: East Azerbaijan
- County: Hashtrud
- Bakhsh: Central
- Rural District: Qaranqu

Population (2006)
  - Total: 307
- Time zone: UTC+3:30 (IRST)
  - Summer (DST): UTC+4:30 (IRDT)

Khvajeh Aur (Persian: خواجه عور, also Romanized as Khvājeh ʿAūr; also known as Khvājeh Ghūr) is a village in Qaranqu Rural District, in the Central District of Hashtrud County, East Azerbaijan Province, Iran. At the 2006 census, its population was 307, in 59 families.
