= Abgarm-e Pir Sohabi =

Abgarm-e Pir Sohabi ابگرم پيرصحابي
- Village
- Country: Iran
- Province: Fars
- County: Kazerun
- Bakhsh: Jereh and Baladeh
- Rural District: Jereh

Population (2006)
  - Total: 91
- Time zone: UTC+3:30 (IRST)
  - Summer (DST): UTC+4:30 (IRDT)

Abgarm-e Pir Sohabi (Persian: ابگرم پيرصحابي, also Romanized as Ābgarm-e Pīr Şoḩābī) is a village in Jereh Rural District, Jereh and Baladeh District, Kazerun County, Fars province, Iran. At the 2006 census, its population was 91, in 19 families.
