= Abgarm, Mamasani =

Abgarm ابگرم
- Village
- Location within Iran
- Coordinates: 29°46′37″N 51°05′03″E
- Country: Iran
- Province: Fars
- County: Mamasani
- Bakhsh: Mahvarmilani
- Rural District: Mishan

Population (2006)
  - Total: 56
- Time zone: UTC+3:30 (IRST)
  - Summer (DST): UTC+4:30 (IRDT)

Abgarm (Persian: ابگرم, also Romanized as Ābgarm) is a village in Mishan Rural District, Mahvarmilani District, Mamasani County, Fars province, Iran. At the 2006 census, its population was 56, in 13 families.
