= Ab-e Garmu, Rudbar-e Jonubi =

Ab-e Garmu ابگرمو
- Village
- Location within Iran
- Coordinates: 28°05′44″N 58°35′03″E
- Country: Iran
- Province: Kerman
- County: Rudbar-e Jonubi
- Bakhsh: Jazmurian
- Rural District: Kuhestan

Population (2006)
  - Total: 52
- Time zone: UTC+3:30 (IRST)
  - Summer (DST): UTC+4:30 (IRDT)

Ab-e Garmu (Persian: ابگرمو, also Romanized as Āb-e Garmū and Ābgarmū) is a village in Kuhestan Rural District, Jazmurian District, Rudbar-e Jonubi County, Kerman province, Iran. At the 2006 census, its population was 52, in 10 families.
