= Abgarm-e Lay Bisheh =

Abgarm-e Lay Bisheh ابگرم لاي بيشه
- Village
- Location within Iran
- Coordinates: 28°17′31″N 55°44′02″E
- Country: Iran
- Province: Hormozgan
- County: Hajjiabad
- Bakhsh: Central
- Rural District: Tarom

Population (2006)
  - Total: 142
- Time zone: UTC+3:30 (IRST)
  - Summer (DST): UTC+4:30 (IRDT)

Abgarm-e Lay Bisheh (Persian: ابگرم لاي بيشه, also Romanized as Ābgarm-e Lāy Bīsheh; also known as Ābgarm) is a village in Tarom Rural District, in the Central District of Hajjiabad County, Hormozgan Province, Iran. At the 2006 census, its population was 142, in 37 families.
