= Khvajehi, Kerman =

Khvajehi خواجه اي
- Village
- Location within Iran
- Coordinates: 29°48′41″N 56°17′50″E
- Country: Iran
- Province: Kerman
- County: Bardsir
- Bakhsh: Central
- Rural District: Kuh Panj

Population (2006)
  - Total: 25
- Time zone: UTC+3:30 (IRST)
  - Summer (DST): UTC+4:30 (IRDT)

Khvajehi (Persian: خواجه اي, also Romanized as Khvājeh’ī) is a village in Kuh Panj Rural District, in the Central District of Bardsir County, Kerman Province, Iran. At the 2006 census, its population was 25, in 8 families.
