= Ab Garm-e Khurgu =

Ab Garm-e Khurgu ابگرم خورگو
- Village
- Location within Iran
- Coordinates: 27°34′50″N 56°54′36″E
- Country: Iran
- Province: Hormozgan
- County: Bandar Abbas
- Bakhsh: Central
- Rural District: Isin

Population (2006)
  - Total: 11
- Time zone: UTC+3:30 (IRST)
  - Summer (DST): UTC+4:30 (IRDT)

Ab Garm-e Khurgu (Persian: ابگرم خورگو, also Romanized as Āb Garm-e Khūrgū; also known as Āb Garm) is a village in Isin Rural District, in the Central District of Bandar Abbas County, Hormozgan Province, Iran. At the 2006 census, its population was 11, in 6 families.
