= Ab-e Garm, Chaldoran =

Ab-e Garm ابگرم
- Village
- Location within Iran
- Coordinates: 39°01′04″N 44°21′19″E
- Country: Iran
- Province: West Azerbaijan
- County: Chaldoran
- Bakhsh: Central
- Rural District: Chaldoran-e Jonubi

Population (2006)
  - Total: 118
- Time zone: UTC+3:30 (IRST)
  - Summer (DST): UTC+4:30 (IRDT)

Ab-e Garm (Persian: ابگرم, also Romanized as Āb-e Garm) is a village in Chaldoran-e Jonubi Rural District, in the Central District of Chaldoran County, West Azerbaijan province, Iran. At the 2006 census, its population was 118, in 24 families.
