= Khvajeh Hoseyni =

Khvajeh Hoseyni خواجه حسيني
- Village
- Location within Iran
- Coordinates: 34°09′18″N 48°22′43″E
- Country: Iran
- Province: Hamadan
- County: Nahavand
- Bakhsh: Central
- Rural District: Shaban

Population (2006)
  - Total: 40
- Time zone: UTC+3:30 (IRST)
  - Summer (DST): UTC+4:30 (IRDT)

Khvajeh Hoseyni (Persian: خواجه حسيني, also Romanized as Khvājeh Ḩoseynī; also known as Z̧afarābād) is a village in Shaban Rural District, in the Central District of Nahavand County, Hamadan Province, Iran. At the 2006 census, its population was 40, in 11 families.
