= Ab Garm, Sepidan =

Ab Garm ابگرم
- Village
- Location within Iran
- Coordinates: 30°03′51″N 52°03′41″E
- Country: Iran
- Province: Fars
- County: Sepidan
- Bakhsh: Hamaijan
- Rural District: Hamaijan

Population (2006)
  - Total: 358
- Time zone: UTC+3:30 (IRST)
  - Summer (DST): UTC+4:30 (IRDT)

Ab Garm (Persian: ابگرم, also Romanized as Āb Garm) is a village in Hamaijan Rural District, Hamaijan District, Sepidan County, Fars province, Iran. At the 2006 census, its population was 358, in 88 families.
