= Ab Garmeh, Kuhdasht =

Ab Garmeh آب گرمه
- Village
- Interactive map of Ab Garmeh
- Coordinates: 33.433°N 46.183°E
- Country: Iran
- Province: Lorestan
- County: Kuhdasht
- Bakhsh: Central
- Rural District: Kuhdasht-e Shomali

Population (2006)
  - Total: 43
- Time zone: UTC+3:30 (IRST)
  - Summer (DST): UTC+4:30 (IRDT)

Ab Garmeh (Persian: آب گرمه, also Romanized as Āb Garmeh) is a village in Kuhdasht-e Shomali Rural District, in the Central District of Kuhdasht County, Lorestan Province, Iran. At the 2006 census, its population was 43, in 13 families.
