= Khvajeh Qalandar =

- Location in Afghanistan
- Coordinates: 34°46′26″N 62°39′47″E
- Country: Afghanistan
- Province: Badghis Province
- Time zone: + 4.30

Khvajeh Qalandar is a village in Badghis Province in northwestern Afghanistan.
