= Ab Garm, Rabor =

Ab Garm ابگرم
- Village
- Location within Iran
- Coordinates: 29°17′47″N 57°08′24″E
- Country: Iran
- Province: Kerman
- County: Rabor
- Bakhsh: Hanza
- Rural District: Hanza

Population (2006)
  - Total: 37
- Time zone: UTC+3:30 (IRST)
  - Summer (DST): UTC+4:30 (IRDT)

Ab Garm (Persian: ابگرم, also Romanized as Āb Garm) is a village in Hanza Rural District, Hanza District, Rabor County, Kerman province, Iran. At the 2006 census, its population was 37, in 6 families. It is a populated place – a city, town, village, or other agglomeration of buildings where people live and work.
