= Ab Garman =

Ab Garman ابگرمان
- Village
- Location within Iran
- Coordinates: 27°19′18″N 57°11′40″E
- Country: Iran
- Province: Hormozgan
- County: Rudan
- Bakhsh: Bikah
- Rural District: Berentin

Population (2006)
  - Total: 247
- Time zone: UTC+3:30 (IRST)
  - Summer (DST): UTC+4:30 (IRDT)

Ab Garman (Persian: ابگرمان, also Romanized as Āb Garmān; also known as Āb Garm) is a village in Berentin Rural District, Bikah District, Rudan County, Hormozgan Province, Iran. At the 2006 census, its population was 247, in 48 families.
