= Ab Garm-e Yek =

Ab Garm-e Yek آبگرم1
- Village
- Location within Iran
- Coordinates: 28°54′18″N 57°53′32″E
- Country: Iran
- Province: Kerman
- County: Jiroft
- Bakhsh: Jebalbarez
- Rural District: Maskun

Population (2006)
  - Total: 396
- Time zone: UTC+3:30 (IRST)
  - Summer (DST): UTC+4:30 (IRDT)

Ab Garm-e Yek (Persian: آبگرم1, also Romanized as Āb Garm-e Yek; also known as Āb Garm and Garm Āb) is a village in Maskun Rural District, Jebalbarez District, Jiroft County, Kerman Province, Iran. At the 2006 census, its population was 396, in 67 families.
