= Khvajeh Kowshah =

- Location in Afghanistan
- Coordinates: 35°1′43″N 66°28′25″E
- Country: Afghanistan
- Province: Bamyan Province
- Time zone: + 4.30

Khvajeh Kowshah is a village in Bamyan Province in central Afghanistan.

== See also ==
- Bamyan Province
