= Ab Garmeh, Lali =

Ab Garmeh اب گرمه
- Village
- Location within Iran
- Coordinates: 32°14′00″N 49°06′00″E
- Country: Iran
- Province: Khuzestan
- County: Lali
- Bakhsh: Central
- Rural District: Dasht-e Lali

Population (2006)
  - Total: 60
- Time zone: UTC+3:30 (IRST)
  - Summer (DST): UTC+4:30 (IRDT)

Ab Garmeh (Persian: اب گرمه, also Romanized as Āb Garmeh) is a village in Dasht-e Lali Rural District, in the Central District of Lali County, Khuzestan Province, Iran. In 2006, its population was 60, in 7 total families.
