= Ab-e Garmu-ye Yek =

Ab-e Garmu-ye Yek آبگرمو1
- Village
- Location within Iran
- Coordinates: 28°49′19″N 58°17′52″E
- Country: Iran
- Province: Kerman
- County: Narmashir
- Bakhsh: Rud Ab
- Rural District: Rud Ab-e Gharbi

Population (2006)
  - Total: 36
- Time zone: UTC+3:30 (IRST)
  - Summer (DST): UTC+4:30 (IRDT)

Ab-e Garmu-ye Yek (Persian: آبگرمو1, also Romanized as Āb-e Garmū-ye Yek; also known as Āb-e Garm-e Pā’īn, Āb-e Garm Pā’īn, Āb-e Garmū, Ab Garm, and Ābgarm-e Pā’īn) is a village in Rud Ab-e Gharbi Rural District, Rud Ab District, Narmashir County, Kerman province, Iran. At the 2006 census, its population was 36, in 11 families.
