= Ab Garm-e Olya =

Ab Garm-e Olya اب گرم عليا
- Village
- Location within Iran
- Coordinates: 30°09′09″N 51°24′27″E
- Country: Iran
- Province: Fars
- County: Mamasani
- Bakhsh: Central
- Rural District: Bakesh-e Do

Population (2006)
  - Total: 37
- Time zone: UTC+3:30 (IRST)
  - Summer (DST): UTC+4:30 (IRDT)

Ab Garm-e Olya (Persian: اب گرم عليا, also Romanized as Āb Garm-e 'Olyā; also known as Āb Garmū, Āb Garmū-ye Bālā, and Garmū) is a village in Bakesh-e Do Rural District, in the Central District of Mamasani County, Fars province, Iran. At the 2006 census, its population was 37, in 6 families.
