= Dask, Hormozgan =

Dask دسك
- Village
- Location within Iran
- Coordinates: 26°48′40″N 57°58′21″E
- Country: Iran
- Province: Hormozgan
- County: Bashagard
- Bakhsh: Gowharan
- Rural District: Gowharan

Population (2006)
  - Total: 93
- Time zone: UTC+3:30 (IRST)
  - Summer (DST): UTC+4:30 (IRDT)

Dask (Persian: دسك; also known as Deskī) is a village in Gowharan Rural District, Gowharan District, Bashagard County, Hormozgan Province, Iran. At the 2006 census, its population was 93, in 19 families.
