= Khvajegi =

Khvajegi خواجگي
- Village
- Location within Iran
- Coordinates: 32°43′51″N 59°06′48″E
- Country: Iran
- Province: South Khorasan
- County: Khusf
- Bakhsh: Jolgeh-e Mazhan
- Rural District: Barakuh

Population (2006)
  - Total: 47
- Time zone: UTC+3:30 (IRST)
  - Summer (DST): UTC+4:30 (IRDT)

Khvajegi (Persian: خواجگي, also Romanized as Khvājegī; also known as Khvājeh, Khvājehgī, and Khvājehi) is a village in Barakuh Rural District, Jolgeh-e Mazhan District, Khusf County, South Khorasan Province, Iran. At the 2006 census, its population was 47, in 14 families.
