= Khvajehi, Fars =

Khvajehi خواجه اي
- Village
- Location within Iran
- Coordinates: 30°13′23″N 52°17′31″E
- Country: Iran
- Province: Fars
- County: Marvdasht
- Bakhsh: Kamfiruz
- Rural District: Khorram Makan

Population (2006)
  - Total: 755
- Time zone: UTC+3:30 (IRST)
  - Summer (DST): UTC+4:30 (IRDT)

Khvajehi (Persian: خواجه اي, also Romanized as Khvājehī; also known as Khvājeh and Khvājeh Yahūd) is a village in Khorram Makan Rural District, Kamfiruz District, Marvdasht County, Fars province, Iran. At the 2006 census, its population was 755, in 152 families.
