= Dehbakri Rural District =

Rural district in Kerman province, Iran

Dehbakri Rural District Persian: دهستان دهبكرئ
- Rural District
- Location within Iran
- Coordinates: 29°04′33″N 57°54′44″E
- Country: Iran
- Province: Kerman
- County: Bam
- District: Dehbakri
- Capital: Dehbid

Population (2016)
  - Total: 12,914
- Time zone: UTC+3:30 (IRST)

Dehbakri Rural District (Persian: دهستان دهبكرئ) is in Dehbakri District of Bam County, Kerman province, Iran. Its capital is the village of Dehbid. (Note: Formerly Dehbakri)

== Demographics ==
=== Population ===
At the time of the 2006 National Census, the rural district's population (as a part of the Central District) was 6,314 in 1,600 households. There were 10,503 inhabitants in 3,346 households at the following census of 2011. The 2016 census measured the population of the rural district as 12,914 in 4,141 households. The most populous of its 56 villages was Dehbakri, (Note: Renamed Dehbid) with 10,726 people.

In 2018, the rural district was separated from the district in the formation of Dehbakri District.
