= Howmeh Rural District (Bam County) =

Rural district in Kerman province, Iran

Howmeh Rural District Persian: دهستان حومه
- Rural District
- Location within Iran
- Coordinates: 29°07′15″N 58°16′06″E
- Country: Iran
- Province: Kerman
- County: Bam
- District: Central
- Capital: Khvajeh Askar

Population (2016)
  - Total: 27,500
- Time zone: UTC+3:30 (IRST)

Howmeh Rural District (Persian: دهستان حومه) is in the Central District of Bam County, Kerman province, Iran. Its capital is the village of Khvajeh Askar.

== Demographics ==
=== Population ===
At the time of the 2006 National Census, the rural district's population was 13,296 in 3,483 households. There were 22,862 inhabitants in 7,729 households at the following census of 2011. The 2016 census measured the population of the rural district as 27,500 in 8,881 households. The most populous of its 172 villages was Abareq, with 4,568 people.
