= Bam County =

County in Kerman province, Iran

Bam County Persian: شهرستان بم
- County
- Location of Bam County in Kerman province (center right, pink)

- Location of Kerman province in Iran
- Coordinates: 29°05′N 58°13′E
- Country: Iran
- Province: Kerman
- Capital: Bam
- Districts: Central, Baravat, Dehbakri

Population (2016)
  - Total: 228,241
- Time zone: UTC+3:30 (IRST)

Bam County (Persian: شهرستان بم) is in Kerman province, Iran. Its capital is the city of Bam. Arg e Bam (Bam Citadel) and its cultural landscape are located in Bam County.

== History ==
After the 2006 National Census, Fahraj District and Chahdegal Rural District were separated from the county in the establishment of Fahraj County; Narmashir and Rud Ab Districts were separated from the county to establish Narmashir County; and Rigan District was separated in establishing Rigan County. In addition, Kork and Nartich Rural District was separated from the Central District, and Rud Ab-e Gharbi Rural District from Rud Ab District, in the formation of Baravat District. After the 2011 census, the city of Baravat joined the new district from the Central District.

In 2018, Darijan Rural District was created in the Central District, and Dehbakri Rural District was separated from it in the formation of Dehbakri District, including the new Abareq Rural District.

== Demographics ==
=== Population ===
At the time of the 2006 census, the county's population was 277,835 in 67,639 households. The following census in 2011 counted 195,603 people in 57,380 households. The 2016 census measured the population of the county as 228,241 in 71,338 households.

=== Administrative divisions ===
Bam County's population history and administrative structure over three consecutive censuses are shown in the following table.

Bam County Population
Administrative Divisions	2006	2011	2016
Central District	118,037	159,129	167,810
Darijan RD (Note: Established after the 2016 census)			
Dehbakri RD	6,314	10,503	12,914
Howmeh RD	13,296	22,862	27,500
Kork and Nartich RD	9,216		
Bam (city)	73,823	107,131	127,396
Baravat (city)	15,388	18,633	
Baravat District		35,673	59,612
Kork and Nartich RD		13,756	12,868
Rud Ab-e Gharbi RD		21,917	23,983
Baravat (city)			22,761
Dehbakri District			
Abareq RD			
Dehbakri RD			
Fahraj District (Note: Transferred to Fahraj County)	23,442		
Borj-e Akram RD	9,465		
Fahraj RD	7,872		
Fahraj (city)	6,105		
Narmashir District (Note: Transferred to Narmashir County)	37,078		
Azizabad RD	18,061		
Poshtrud RD	15,051		
Narmashir (city)	3,966		
Rigan District (Note: Transferred to Rigan County)	70,908		
Chahdegal RD	17,849		
Gavkan RD	9,246		
Gonbaki RD	11,926		
Rigan RD	26,114		
Mohammadabad (city)	5,773		
Rud Ab District	28,370		
Rud Ab-e Gharbi RD	14,554		
Rud Ab-e Sharqi RD	12,059		
Nezamshahr (city)	1,757		
Total	277,835	195,603	228,241
RD = Rural District

== See also ==
Media related to Bam County at Wikimedia Commons
