= Central District (Bam County) =

District in Kerman province, Iran

Central District (Bam County) Persian: بخش مرکزی شهرستان بم
- District
- Location within Iran
- Coordinates: 29°01′34″N 58°09′52″E
- Country: Iran
- Province: Kerman
- County: Bam
- Capital: Bam

Population (2016)
  - Total: 167,810
- Time zone: UTC+3:30 (IRST)

The Central District of Bam County (Persian: بخش مرکزی شهرستان بم) is in Kerman province, Iran. Its capital is the city of Bam.

== History ==
After the 2006 National Census, Kork and Nartich Rural District was separated from the district in the formation of Baravat District. After the 2011 census, the city of Baravat joined the new district from the Central District.

In 2018, Darijan Rural District was created in the Central District, and Dehbakri Rural District was separated from it in the establishment of Dehbakri District.

== Demographics ==
=== Population ===
At the time of the 2006 census, the district's population was 118,037 in 31,124 households. The following census in 2011 counted 159,129 people in 46,173 households. The 2016 census measured the population of the district as 167,810 inhabitants in 52,065 households.

=== Administrative divisions ===
Central District (Bam County) Population
Administrative Divisions	2006	2011	2016
Darijan RD (Note: Established after the 2016 census)			
Dehbakri RD (Note: Transferred to Dehbakri District after the 2016 census)	6,314	10,503	12,914
Howmeh RD	13,296	22,862	27,500
Kork and Nartich RD (Note: Transferred to Baravat District after the 2006 census)	9,216		
Bam (city)	73,823	107,131	127,396
Baravat (city) (Note: Transferred to Baravat District after the 2011 census)	15,388	18,633	
Total	118,037	159,129	167,810
RD = Rural District
