= Qaemabad =

Qaemabad or Ghaemabad or Qaimabad or Qayemabad (Persian: قائم اباد) may refer to:

- Qaemabad, Ardabil
- Qaemabad, Isfahan
- Qaemabad, Kerman
- Qaemabad, Arzuiyeh, Kerman Province
- Qaemabad, Narmashir, Kerman Province
- Qaemabad, Sistan and Baluchestan
- Qaemabad, South Khorasan
- Qaemabad, alternate name for Kalateh-ye Mir, South Khorasan
- Qaemabad-e Razzaqzadeh, South Khorasan
- Qaemabad Rural District (disambiguation)
