= Madeh Kariz =

Village in Sistan and Baluchestan province, Iran

Madeh Kariz Persian: ماده کاریز
- Village
- Location within Iran
- Coordinates: 31°08′59″N 60°23′29″E
- Country: Iran
- Province: Sistan and Baluchestan
- County: Nimruz
- District: Sefidabeh
- Rural District: Madeh Kariz

Population (2016)
  - Total: 438
- Time zone: UTC+3:30 (IRST)

Madeh Kariz (Persian: ماده کاریز) is a village in, and the capital of, Madeh Kariz Rural District of Sefidabeh District of Nimruz County, Sistan and Baluchestan province, Iran.

== Demographics ==
=== Population ===
At the time of the 2006 National Census, the village's population was 394 in 77 households, when it was in Sefidabeh Rural District of the former Posht Ab District of Zabol County. The following census in 2011 counted 341 people in 77 households. The 2016 census measured the population of the village as 438 people in 96 households, by which time the district had been separated from the county in the establishment of Nimruz County. The rural district was transferred to the new Saberi District.

After the census the rural district was separated from the district in the establishment of Sefidabeh District. Madeh Kariz was transferred to Madeh Kariz Rural District created in the new district.
