= Koduru =

Kodur, Koduru or Kodoor may refer to:

== India ==
=== Andhra Pradesh ===
- B. Kodur, a village in YSR district, Andhra Pradesh, India
- Koduru, Krishna district a village in Krishna district, Andhra Pradesh, India
- Railway Koduru, a village in Tirupati district, Andhra Pradesh, India
- Koduru, Vizianagaram district, a village in Vizianagaram district, Andhra Pradesh, India
- Kodur (East), a village in Tirupati District, Andhra Pradesh, India
- Koduru mandal,Tirupati district,a mandal in Tirupati District, Andhra Pradesh, India
- Kodur (Assembly constituency)

=== Kerala ===
- Kodur, Malappuram, a village in Malappuram district, Kerala, India
- Kodoor River, a river in Kerala

=== Telangana ===
- Chinna Kodur, a village in Medak district, Telangana, India
- Kodur, Pulkal, a village in Pulkal mandal, Medak district, Telangana, India

== Iran ==
- Kodur-e Bala, a village in Kerman Province
- Kodur-e Pain, a village in Kerman Province
