= Golkhani =

Village in Sistan and Baluchestan province, Iran

Golkhani Persian: گلخانی
- Village
- Location within Iran
- Coordinates: 31°02′07″N 61°23′44″E
- Country: Iran
- Province: Sistan and Baluchestan
- County: Nimruz
- District: Saberi
- Rural District: Golkhani

Population (2016)
  - Total: 2,064
- Time zone: UTC+3:30 (IRST)

Golkhani (Persian: گلخانی) is a village in, and the capital of, Golkhani Rural District of Saberi District, Nimruz County, Sistan and Baluchestan province, Iran.

== Demographics ==
=== Population ===
At the time of the 2006 National Census, the village's population was 1,491 in 324 households, when it was in Qaemabad Rural District of the former Posht Ab District of Zabol County. The following census in 2011 counted 1,771 people in 438 households. The 2016 census measured the population of the village as 2,064 people in 501 households, by which time the district had been separated from the county in the establishment of Nimruz County. The rural district was transferred to the new Saberi District.

Golkhani was transferred to Golkhani Rural District created in the district after the 2016 census.
