= Paqich Bandar =

Paqich Bandar پاقيچ بندر
- Village
- Interactive map of Paqich Bandar
- Country: Iran
- Province: Kerman
- County: Narmashir
- Bakhsh: Rud Ab
- Rural District: Rud Ab-e Gharbi

Population (2006)
  - Total: 144
- Time zone: UTC+3:30 (IRST)
  - Summer (DST): UTC+4:30 (IRDT)

Paqich Bandar (Persian: پاقيچ بندر, also Romanized as Pāqīch Bandar) is a village in Rud Ab-e Gharbi Rural District, Rud Ab District, Narmashir County, Kerman Province, Iran. At the 2006 census, its population was 144, in 36 families.
