= Qasr, Kerman =

Qasr قصر
- Village
- Location within Iran
- Coordinates: 28°55′47″N 58°41′05″E
- Country: Iran
- Province: Kerman
- County: Narmashir
- Bakhsh: Central
- Rural District: Azizabad

Population (2006)
  - Total: 572
- Time zone: UTC+3:30 (IRST)
  - Summer (DST): UTC+4:30 (IRDT)

Qasr (Persian: قصر, also Romanized as Qaşr; also known as Ghasr) is a village in Azizabad Rural District, in the Central District of Narmashir County, Kerman Province, Iran. At the 2006 census, its population was 572, in 127 families.
