= Choghukabad =

Choghukabad چغوك اباد
- Village
- Location within Iran
- Coordinates: 28°55′18″N 58°40′08″E
- Country: Iran
- Province: Kerman
- County: Narmashir
- Bakhsh: Central
- Rural District: Azizabad

Population (2006)
  - Total: 1,656
- Time zone: UTC+3:30 (IRST)
  - Summer (DST): UTC+4:30 (IRDT)

Choghukabad (Persian: چغوك اباد, also Romanized as 'Choghūkābād; also known as Joghūkābād) is a village in Azizabad Rural District, in the Central District of Narmashir County, Kerman province, Iran. At the 2006 census, its population was 1,656, in 396 families. The village's name means "sparrow town". Some ruins near the village probably represent the former site of the city of Narmashir during the Middle Ages.
