= Asadiyeh-e Pain =

Asadiyeh-e Pain اسديه پايين
- Village
- Location within Iran
- Coordinates: 28°59′23″N 58°45′03″E
- Country: Iran
- Province: Kerman
- County: Narmashir
- Bakhsh: Central
- Rural District: Posht Rud

Population (2006)
  - Total: 267
- Time zone: UTC+3:30 (IRST)
  - Summer (DST): UTC+4:30 (IRDT)

Asadiyeh-e Pain (Persian: اسديه پايين, also Romanized as Asadīyeh-e Pā’īn) is a village in Posht Rud Rural District, in the Central District of Narmashir County, Kerman Province, Iran. At the 2006 census, its population was 267, in 59 families.
