= Rud Moshk =

Rud Moshk رودمشك
- Village
- Location within Iran
- Coordinates: 28°51′20″N 58°32′01″E
- Country: Iran
- Province: Kerman
- County: Narmashir
- Bakhsh: Rud Ab
- Rural District: Rud Ab-e Gharbi

Population (2006)
  - Total: 197
- Time zone: UTC+3:30 (IRST)
  - Summer (DST): UTC+4:30 (IRDT)

Rud Moshk (Persian: رودمشك, also Romanized as Rūd Moshk, Rood Moshk, Rūd-e Moshk, and Rūdmeshk; also known as Rūdi Mushk, Rūd Moshg, and Meshk) is a village in Rud Ab-e Gharbi Rural District, Rud Ab District, Narmashir County, Kerman Province, Iran. At the 2006 census, its population was 197, in 45 families.
