= Chark, Iran =

Village in Sistan and Baluchestan province, Iran

Chark Persian: چرک
- Village
- Location within Iran
- Coordinates: 31°08′26″N 61°30′10″E
- Country: Iran
- Province: Sistan and Baluchestan
- County: Nimruz
- District: Central
- Rural District: Bazi

Population (2016)
  - Total: 830
- Time zone: UTC+3:30 (IRST)

Chark (Persian: چرک) is a village in Bazi Rural District of the Central District of Nimruz County, Sistan and Baluchestan province, Iran.

== Demographics ==
=== Population ===
At the time of the 2006 National Census, the village's population was 718 in 148 households, when it was in the former Posht Ab District of Zabol County. The following census in 2011 counted 856 people in 190 households. The 2016 census measured the population of the village as 830 people in 199 households, by which time the district had been separated from the county in the establishment of Nimruz County. The rural district was transferred to the new Central District. It was the most populous village in its rural district.
