= Adim ol Mesal =

Adim ol Mesal عديم المثال
- Village
- Location within Iran
- Coordinates: 28°56′13″N 58°30′10″E
- Country: Iran
- Province: Kerman
- County: Narmashir
- Bakhsh: Rud Ab
- Rural District: Rud Ab-e Gharbi

Population (2006)
  - Total: 72
- Time zone: UTC+3:30 (IRST)
  - Summer (DST): UTC+4:30 (IRDT)

Adim ol Mesal (Persian: عديم المثال, also Romanized as ‘Adīm ol Mes̄āl; also known as ‘Adīm ol Maşşl) is a village in Rud Ab-e Gharbi Rural District, Rud Ab District, Narmashir County, Kerman Province, Iran. At the 2006 census, its population was 72, in 19 families.
