= Borunabad =

Borunabad برون اباد
- Village
- Location within Iran
- Coordinates: 28°56′00″N 58°35′00″E
- Country: Iran
- Province: Kerman
- County: Narmashir
- Bakhsh: Rud Ab
- Rural District: Rud Ab-e Sharqi

Population (2006)
  - Total: 118
- Time zone: UTC+3:30 (IRST)
  - Summer (DST): UTC+4:30 (IRDT)

Borunabad (Persian: برون اباد, also Romanized as Borūnābād) is a village in Rud Ab-e Sharqi Rural District, Rud Ab District, Narmashir County, Kerman Province, Iran. At the 2006 census, its population was 118, in 27 families.
