= Haft Badam =

Haft Badam هفت بادام
- Village
- Location within Iran
- Coordinates: 28°46′00″N 58°23′00″E
- Country: Iran
- Province: Kerman
- County: Narmashir
- Bakhsh: Rud Ab
- Rural District: Rud Ab-e Gharbi

Population (2006)
  - Total: 118
- Time zone: UTC+3:30 (IRST)
  - Summer (DST): UTC+4:30 (IRDT)

Haft Badam (Persian: هفت بادام, also Romanized as Haft Bādām) is a village in Rud Ab-e Gharbi Rural District, Rud Ab District, Narmashir County, Kerman Province, Iran. At the 2006 census, its population was 118, in 28 families.
