= Deh Fatah Allah =

Village in Sistan and Baluchestan province, Iran

Deh Fatah Allah Persian: ده‌فتح‌الله
- Village
- Location within Iran
- Coordinates: 31°01′49″N 61°27′45″E
- Country: Iran
- Province: Sistan and Baluchestan
- County: Nimruz
- District: Saberi
- Rural District: Qaemabad

Population (2016)
  - Total: 2,429
- Time zone: UTC+3:30 (IRST)

Deh Fatah Allah (Persian: ده‌فتح‌الله) is a village in Qaemabad Rural District of Saberi District, Nimruz County, Sistan and Baluchestan province, Iran.

== Demographics ==
=== Population ===
At the time of the 2006 National Census, the village's population was 2,279 in 452 households, when it was in the former Posht Ab District of Zabol County. The following census in 2011 counted 2,412 people in 563 households. The 2016 census measured the population of the village as 2,429 people in 623 households, by which time the district had been separated from the county in the establishment of Nimruz County. The rural district was transferred to the new Saberi District. It was the most populous village in its rural district.
