= Mowmenabad, Narmashir =

Village in Kerman province, Iran

Mowmenabad Persian: مؤمن‌آباد
- Village
- Location within Iran
- Coordinates: 28°56′23″N 58°31′50″E
- Country: Iran
- Province: Kerman
- County: Narmashir
- District: Rud Ab
- Rural District: Momenabad

Population (2016)
  - Total: 1,711
- Time zone: UTC+3:30 (IRST)

Mowmenabad (Persian: مؤمن‌آباد) (Note: Also romanized as Mow’menābād) is a village in, and the capital of, Momenabad Rural District, Rud Ab District, Narmashir County, Kerman province, Iran.

== Demographics ==
=== Population ===
At the time of the 2006 National Census, the village's population was 1,855 in 490 households, when it was in Rud Ab-e Sharqi Rural District of Bam County. The following census in 2011 counted 2,068 people in 567 households, by which time the district had been separated from the county in the establishment of Narmashir County. Mowmenabad was transferred to Momenabad Rural District created in the district. The 2016 census measured the population of the village as 1,711 people in 503 households. It was the most populous village in its rural district.
