= Qaleh Shahid =

Village in Kerman province, Iran

Qaleh Shahid Persian: قلعه شهيد
- Village
- Location within Iran
- Coordinates: 28°54′55″N 58°39′08″E
- Country: Iran
- Province: Kerman
- County: Narmashir
- District: Central
- Rural District: Poshtrud

Population (2016)
  - Total: 1,923
- Time zone: UTC+3:30 (IRST)

Qaleh Shahid (Persian: قلعه شهيد) (Note: Also romanized as Qal‘eh Shahīd; also known as Qal‘eh Khān, Qal‘eh-i-Khān, and Qal‘eh-ye Khān) is a village in Poshtrud Rural District of the Central District of Narmashir County, Kerman province, Iran.

== Demographics ==
=== Population ===
At the time of the 2006 National Census, the village's population was 1,911 in 462 households, when it was in the former Narmashir District of Bam County. The following census in 2011 counted 2,079 people in 573 households, by which time the district had been separated from the county in the establishment of Narmashir County. The rural district was transferred to the new Central District. The 2016 census measured the population of the village as 1,923 people in 579 households. It was the most populous village in its rural district.
