= Deh-e Vasat =

Village in Kerman province, Iran

Deh-e Vasat Persian: ده وسط
- Village
- Location within Iran
- Coordinates: 28°56′00″N 58°42′29″E
- Country: Iran
- Province: Kerman
- County: Narmashir
- District: Central
- Rural District: Azizabad

Population (2016)
  - Total: 1,508
- Time zone: UTC+3:30 (IRST)

Deh-e Vasat (Persian: ده وسط) (Note: Also romanized as Deh-e Vasaţ; also known as Deh Vasaţ-e Now) is a village in, and the capital of, Azizabad Rural District of the Central District of Narmashir County, Kerman province, Iran.

== Demographics ==
=== Population ===
At the time of the 2006 National Census, the village's population was 1,063 in 235 households, when it was in the former Narmashir District of Bam County. The following census in 2011 counted 1,330 people in 383 households, by which time the district had been separated from the county in the establishment of Narmashir County. The rural district was transferred to the new Central District. The 2016 census measured the population of the village as 1,508 people in 435 households.
