= Posht Rud =

Posht Rud or Posht-e Rud (Persian: پشت رود) may refer to:

- Posht Rud, Bam, Kerman Province
- Posht-e Rud, Bardsir, Kerman Province
- Posht Rud, Sistan and Baluchestan
- Posht Rud Rural District, in Kerman Province

== See also ==
- Rud Posht (disambiguation)
