= Qannad =

Qannad قناد
- Village
- Location within Iran
- Coordinates: 28°52′18″N 58°31′42″E
- Country: Iran
- Province: Kerman
- County: Narmashir
- Bakhsh: Rud Ab
- Rural District: Rud Ab-e Sharqi

Population (2006)
  - Total: 620
- Time zone: UTC+3:30 (IRST)
  - Summer (DST): UTC+4:30 (IRDT)

Qannad (Persian: قناد, also Romanized as Qannād) is a village in Rud Ab-e Sharqi Rural District, Rud Ab District, Narmashir County, Kerman Province, Iran. At the 2006 census, its population was 620, in 151 families.
