= Zeydabad (disambiguation) =

Zeydabad is a city in Kerman Province, Iran.

Zeydabad (Persian: زيدآباد or زيداباد) may refer to:

- Zeydabad, Bam, Kerman Province
- Zeydabad Chehel Tokhm, Bam County, Kerman Province
- Zeydabad, Fahraj, Kerman Province
- Zeydabad, Razavi Khorasan
- Zeydabad Rural District, in Kerman Province
