= Moshk =

Moshk مشك
- Village
- Location within Iran
- Coordinates: 28°54′01″N 58°32′50″E
- Country: Iran
- Province: Kerman
- County: Narmashir
- Bakhsh: Rud Ab
- Rural District: Rud Ab-e Sharqi

Population (2006)
  - Total: 690
- Time zone: UTC+3:30 (IRST)
  - Summer (DST): UTC+4:30 (IRDT)

Moshk (Persian: مشك, also Romanized as Mashk; also known as Moshg) is a village in Rud Ab-e Sharqi Rural District, Rud Ab District, Narmashir County, Kerman Province, Iran. At the 2006 census, its population was 690, in 174 families.
