= Sefidabeh =

Village in Sistan and Baluchestan province, Iran

Sefidabeh Persian: سفیدابه
- Village
- Location within Iran
- Coordinates: 30°58′30″N 60°31′41″E
- Country: Iran
- Province: Sistan and Baluchestan
- County: Nimruz
- District: Sefidabeh
- Rural District: Sefidabeh

Population (2016)
  - Total: 3,434
- Time zone: UTC+3:30 (IRST)

Sefidabeh (Persian: سفیدابه) is a village in Sefidabeh Rural District of Sefidabeh District, Nimruz County, Sistan and Baluchestan province, Iran, serving as capital of both the district and the rural district.

== Demographics ==
=== Population ===
At the time of the 2006 National Census, the village's population was 2,455 in 466 households, when it was in the former Posht Ab District of Zabol County. The following census in 2011 counted 2,584 people in 525 households. The 2016 census measured the population of the village as 3,434 people in 707 households, by which time the district had been separated from the county in the establishment of Nimruz County. The rural district was transferred to the new Saberi District. Sefidabeh was the most populous village in its rural district.

After the census, the rural district was separated from the district in the formation of Sefidabeh District.
