= Zaimabad =

Zaimabad زعيم اباد
- Village
- Location within Iran
- Coordinates: 28°58′10″N 58°42′09″E
- Country: Iran
- Province: Kerman
- County: Narmashir
- Bakhsh: Central
- Rural District: Posht Rud

Population (2006)
  - Total: 392
- Time zone: UTC+3:30 (IRST)
  - Summer (DST): UTC+4:30 (IRDT)

Zaimabad (Persian: زعيم اباد, also Romanized as Zaʿīmābād; also known as Zaeemābād) is a village in Posht Rud Rural District, in the Central District of Narmashir County, Kerman Province, Iran. At the 2006 census, its population was 392, in 86 families.
