= Sar Nesa =

Sar Nesa سرنسا
- Village
- Location within Iran
- Coordinates: 28°51′39″N 58°30′06″E
- Country: Iran
- Province: Kerman
- County: Narmashir
- Bakhsh: Rud Ab
- Rural District: Rud Ab-e Gharbi

Population (2006)
  - Total: 494
- Time zone: UTC+3:30 (IRST)
  - Summer (DST): UTC+4:30 (IRDT)

Sar Nesa (Persian: سرنسا, also Romanized as Sar Nesā’ and Sar Nasā’) is a village in Rud Ab-e Gharbi Rural District, Rud Ab District, Narmashir County, Kerman Province, Iran. At the 2006 census, its population was 494, in 111 families.
