= Madeh Kariz Rural District =

Rural district in Sistan and Baluchestan province, Iran

Madeh Kariz Rural District Persian: دهستان ماده کاریز
- Rural District
- Location within Iran
- Coordinates: 31°08′59″N 60°23′29″E
- Country: Iran
- Province: Sistan and Baluchestan
- County: Nimruz
- District: Sefidabeh
- Capital: Madeh Kariz
- Time zone: UTC+3:30 (IRST)

Madeh Kariz Rural District (Persian: دهستان ماده کاریز) is in Sefidabeh District of Nimruz County, Sistan and Baluchestan province, Iran. Its capital is the village of Madeh Kariz, whose population at the time of the 2016 National Census was 438 people in 96 households.

== History ==
In 2013, Posht Ab District was separated from Zabol County in the establishment of Nimruz County. After the 2016 census, Sefidabeh Rural District was separated from Saberi District in the establishment of Sefidabeh District, and Madeh Kariz Rural District was created in the new district.
