= Rutak =

Rutak روتك
- Village
- Location within Iran
- Coordinates: 28°49′37″N 58°29′33″E
- Country: Iran
- Province: Kerman
- County: Narmashir
- Bakhsh: Rud Ab
- Rural District: Rud Ab-e Gharbi

Population (2006)
  - Total: 472
- Time zone: UTC+3:30 (IRST)
  - Summer (DST): UTC+4:30 (IRDT)

Rutak (Persian: روتك, also Romanized as Rūtak; also known as Rūdtak) is a village in Rud Ab-e Gharbi Rural District, Rud Ab District, Narmashir County, Kerman Province, Iran. At the 2006 census, its population was 472, in 87 families.
