= Deh Bazi-ye Olya =

Village in Sistan and Baluchestan province, Iran

Deh Bazi-ye Olya Persian: ده بزی علیا
- Village
- Location within Iran
- Coordinates: 31°10′06″N 61°29′11″E
- Country: Iran
- Province: Sistan and Baluchestan
- County: Nimruz
- District: Central
- Rural District: Bazi

Population (2016)
  - Total: 175
- Time zone: UTC+3:30 (IRST)

Deh Bazi-ye Olya (Persian: ده بزی علیا) is a village in, and the capital of, Bazi Rural District of the Central District of Nimruz County, Sistan and Baluchestan province, Iran.

== Demographics ==
=== Population ===
At the time of the 2006 National Census, the village's population was 159 in 39 households, when it was in the former Posht Ab District of Zabol County. The following census in 2011 counted 175 people in 46 households. The 2016 census measured the population of the village as 175 people in 55 households, by which time the district had been separated from the county in the establishment of Nimruz County. The rural district was transferred to the new Central District.
