= Qasemabad, Narmashir =

Village in Kerman province, Iran

Qasemabad Persian: قاسم اباد
- Village
- Location within Iran
- Coordinates: 28°58′05″N 58°38′40″E
- Country: Iran
- Province: Kerman
- County: Narmashir
- District: Central
- Rural District: Poshtrud

Population (2016)
  - Total: 1,194
- Time zone: UTC+3:30 (IRST)

Qasemabad (Persian: قاسم اباد) (Note: Also romanized as Qāsemābād; also known as Ghasem Abad and Qāsimābād) is a village in, and the capital of, Poshtrud Rural District of the Central District of Narmashir County, Kerman province, Iran.

== Demographics ==
=== Population ===
At the time of the 2006 National Census, the village's population was 1,268 in 324 households, when it was in the former Narmashir District of Bam County. The following census in 2011 counted 1,716 people in 411 households, by which time the district had been separated from the county in the establishment of Narmashir County. The rural district was transferred to the new Central District. The 2016 census measured the population of the village as 1,194 people in 387 households.
