= Aliabad, Baravat =

Village in Kerman province, Iran

Aliabad Persian: علي اباد
- Village
- Location within Iran
- Coordinates: 28°49′35″N 58°18′18″E
- Country: Iran
- Province: Kerman
- County: Bam
- District: Baravat
- Rural District: Rud Ab-e Gharbi

Population (2016)
  - Total: 19
- Time zone: UTC+3:30 (IRST)

Aliabad (Persian: علي اباد) (Note: Also romanized as ‘Alīābād; also known as Mehdīābād) is a village in Rud Ab-e Gharbi Rural District of Baravat District, Bam County, Kerman province, Iran.

== Demographics ==
=== Population ===
At the time of the 2006 National Census, the village's population was 67 in 16 households, when it was in Rud Ab District. The following census in 2011 counted 37 people in 12 households, by which time the rural district had been separated from the district in the formation of Baravat District. The 2016 census measured the population of the village as 19 people in 7 households.
