= Qotbabad, Kerman =

Qotbabad قطب اباد
- Village
- Location within Iran
- Coordinates: 28°52′44″N 58°28′29″E
- Country: Iran
- Province: Kerman
- County: Narmashir
- Bakhsh: Rud Ab
- Rural District: Rud Ab-e Gharbi

Population (2006)
  - Total: 2,030
- Time zone: UTC+3:30 (IRST)
  - Summer (DST): UTC+4:30 (IRDT)

Qotbabad (Persian: قطب اباد, also Romanized as Qoţbābād; also known as Qoţābād) is a village in Rud Ab-e Gharbi Rural District, Rud Ab District, Narmashir County, Kerman Province, Iran. At the 2006 census, its population was 2,030, in 475 families.
