= Faqir Lashkari =

Village in Sistan and Baluchestan province, Iran

Faqir Lashkari Persian: فقیر لشکری
- Village
- Country: Iran
- Province: Sistan and Baluchestan
- County: Nimruz
- District: Central
- Rural District: Adimi

Population (2016)
  - Total: 1,954
- Time zone: UTC+3:30 (IRST)

Faqir Lashkari (Persian: فقیر لشکری) is a village in Adimi Rural District of the Central District of Nimruz County, Sistan and Baluchestan province, Iran.

== Demographics ==
=== Population ===
At the time of the 2006 National Census, the village's population was 1,912 in 420 households, when it was in the former Posht Ab District of Zabol County. The following census in 2011 counted 2,459 people in 643 households. The 2016 census measured the population of the village as 1,954 people in 552 households, by which time the district had been separated from the county in the establishment of Nimruz County. The rural district was transferred to the new Central District. It was the most populous village in its rural district.
