= Rafiabad =

Rafiabad (Persian: رفيعي اباد or رفيع اباد) may refer to:

Iran

- Rafiabad, Fars
- Rafiabad, Isfahan
- Rafiabad, Kerman
- Rafiabad, alternate name of Borz-e Rafiabad, Kerman Province
- Rafiabad, Khuzestan
- Rafiabad, Mazandaran

India

- Rafiabad, India, a town in Jammu and Kashmir
