= Abdolabad, Narmashir =

Abdolabad عبدل‌آباد
- village
- Location within Iran
- Coordinates: 28°58′19″N 58°39′23″E
- Country: Iran
- Province: Kerman
- County: Narmashir
- Bakhsh: Central
- Rural District: Posht Rud

Population (2006)
  - Total: 111
- Time zone: UTC+3:30 (IRST)
  - Summer (DST): UTC+4:30 (IRDT)

Abdolabad (Persian: عبدل‌آباد, also Romanized as ‘Abdolābād; also known as ‘Abdābād, ‘Abdolābād-e Behzādī, and ‘Abdollāhābād) is a village in Posht Rud Rural District, in the Central District of Narmashir County, Kerman Province, Iran. At the 2006 census, its population was 111, in 28 families.
