= Enayatabad, Narmashir =

Enayatabad عنايت اباد
- Village
- Location within Iran
- Coordinates: 28°54′31″N 58°36′43″E
- Country: Iran
- Province: Kerman
- County: Narmashir
- Bakhsh: Rud Ab
- Rural District: Rud Ab-e Sharqi

Population (2006)
  - Total: 812
- Time zone: UTC+3:30 (IRST)
  - Summer (DST): UTC+4:30 (IRDT)

Enayatabad (Persian: عنايت اباد, also Romanized as ‘Enāyatābād) is a village in Rud Ab-e Sharqi Rural District, Rud Ab District, Narmashir County, Kerman Province, Iran. At the 2006 census, its population was 812, in 201 families.
