= Chehel Tokhm =

Chehel Tokhm (Persian: چهل تخم) may refer to:

- Chehel Tokhm, Bam
- Chehel Tokhm, Narmashir
