= Enayatabad =

Enayatabad (Persian: عنايتاباد) may refer to:

- Enayatabad, Jiroft
- Enayatabad, Narmashir
