= Kahn-e Mahalleh-ye Bala =

Kahn-e Mahalleh-ye Bala كهن محله بالا
- Village
- Location within Iran
- Coordinates: 28°52′45″N 58°30′51″E
- Country: Iran
- Province: Kerman
- County: Narmashir
- Bakhsh: Rud Ab
- Rural District: Rud Ab-e Sharqi

Population (2006)
  - Total: 81
- Time zone: UTC+3:30 (IRST)
  - Summer (DST): UTC+4:30 (IRDT)

Kahn-e Mahalleh-ye Bala (Persian: كهن محله بالا, also Romanized as Kahn-e Maḩalleh-ye Bālā; also known as Kahn-e Maḩalleh, Kahn Maḩal, Kahn Mahalleh, and Kohan Maḩalleh) is a village in Rud Ab-e Sharqi Rural District, Rud Ab District, Narmashir County, Kerman Province, Iran. As per the 2006 census, its population was 81, in 20 families.
