= Balarud =

Balarud and Bala Rud (Persian: بالارود) may refer to:

- Bala Rud, Kerman
- Istgah-e Balarud
- Pol-e Bala Rud
