= Deh Now-e Sheykh Ali Khan =

Deh Now-e Sheykh Ali Khan ده نوشيخ عليخان
- Village
- Location within Iran
- Coordinates: 28°57′28″N 58°42′14″E
- Country: Iran
- Province: Kerman
- County: Narmashir
- Bakhsh: Central
- Rural District: Posht Rud

Population (2006)
  - Total: 163
- Time zone: UTC+3:30 (IRST)
  - Summer (DST): UTC+4:30 (IRDT)

Deh Now-e Sheykh Ali Khan (Persian: ده نوشيخ عليخان, also Romanized as Deh Now-e Sheykh ʿAlī Khān; also known as Deh-e Shūr, Deh Now-e Āb Shūr, and Deh Shūr) is a village in Posht Rud Rural District, in the Central District of Narmashir County, Kerman Province, Iran. At the 2006 census, its population was 163, with 41 families.
