= Kahn-e Mahalleh-ye Pain =

Kahn-e Mahalleh-ye Pain كهن محله پايين
- Village
- Location within Iran
- Coordinates: 28°53′00″N 58°31′00″E
- Country: Iran
- Province: Kerman
- County: Narmashir
- Bakhsh: Rud Ab
- Rural District: Rud Ab-e Sharqi

Population (2006)
  - Total: 234
- Time zone: UTC+3:30 (IRST)
  - Summer (DST): UTC+4:30 (IRDT)

Kahn-e Mahalleh-ye Pain (Persian: كهن محله پايين, also Romanized as Kahn-e Maḩalleh-ye Pā’īn) is a village in Rud Ab-e Sharqi Rural District, Rud Ab District, Narmashir County, Kerman Province, Iran. At the 2006 census, its population was 234, in 47 families.
