= Jalalabad, Narmashir =

Village in Kerman province, Iran

Jalalabad Persian: جلال اباد
- Village
- Location within Iran
- Coordinates: 28°54′23″N 58°34′10″E
- Country: Iran
- Province: Kerman
- County: Narmashir
- District: Rud Ab
- Rural District: Rud Ab-e Sharqi

Population (2016)
  - Total: 1,359
- Time zone: UTC+3:30 (IRST)

Jalalabad (Persian: جلال اباد) (Note: Also romanized as Jalālābād) is a village in Rud Ab-e Sharqi Rural District, Rud Ab District, Narmashir County, Kerman province, Iran.

== Demographics ==
=== Population ===
At the time of the 2006 National Census, the village's population was 1,302 in 322 households, when it was in Bam County. The following census in 2011 counted 1,322 people in 353 households, by which time the rural district had been separated from the county in the establishment of Narmashir County. The 2016 census measured the population of the village as 1,359 people in 452 households. It was the most populous village in its rural district.
