= Kamraniyeh-ye Bala =

Kamraniyeh-ye Bala كامرانيه بالا
- Village
- Location within Iran
- Coordinates: 28°54′58″N 58°40′24″E
- Country: Iran
- Province: Kerman
- County: Narmashir
- Bakhsh: Central
- Rural District: Azizabad

Population (2006)
  - Total: 305
- Time zone: UTC+3:30 (IRST)
  - Summer (DST): UTC+4:30 (IRDT)

Kamraniyeh-ye Bala (Persian: كامرانيه بالا, also Romanized as Kāmrānīyeh-ye Bālā; also known as Kāmrānīyeh) is a village in Azizabad Rural District, in the Central District of Narmashir County, Kerman Province, Iran. At the 2006 census, its population was 305, in 73 families.
