= Torkabad =

Torkabad or Tarkabad (Persian: ترك اباد or تركاباد), also rendered as Turkabad, may refer to:

- Torkabad, Baft
- Torkabad, Narmashir
- Torkabad, Yazd
