= Ziaabad, Kerman =

Ziaabad ضيااباد
- Village
- Location within Iran
- Coordinates: 28°58′07″N 58°44′30″E
- Country: Iran
- Province: Kerman
- County: Narmashir
- Bakhsh: Central
- Rural District: Posht Rud

Population (2006)
  - Total: 625
- Time zone: UTC+3:30 (IRST)
  - Summer (DST): UTC+4:30 (IRDT)

Ziaabad (Persian: ضيااباد, also Romanized as Ẕīā’ābād; also known as Ẕīādābād and Ẕīyā’ābād) is a village in Posht Rud Rural District, in the Central District of Narmashir County, Kerman Province, Iran. At the 2006 census, its population was 625, in 165 families.
