= Mohammadabad-e Seyyed Nezam =

Village in Kerman province, Iran

Mohammadabad-e Seyyed Nezam Persian: محمدابادسيدنظام
- Village
- Location within Iran
- Coordinates: 29°08′24″N 58°30′36″E
- Country: Iran
- Province: Kerman
- County: Bam
- District: Baravat
- Rural District: Kork and Nartich

Population (2016)
  - Total: Below reporting threshold
- Time zone: UTC+3:30 (IRST)

Mohammadabad-e Seyyed Nezam (Persian: محمدابادسيدنظام) (Note: Also romanized as Moḩammadābād-e Seyyed Neẓām; also known as Moḩammadābād-e Seyyed Neẓāmī) is a village in Kork and Nartich Rural District of Baravat District, Bam County, Kerman province, Iran.

== Demographics ==
=== Population ===
At the time of the 2006 National Census, the village's population was 16 in five households, when it was in the Central District. The following census in 2011 counted 58 people in 23 households, by which time the rural district had been separated from the district in the formation of Baravat District. The 2016 census measured the population of the village as below the reporting threshold.
