= Borz-e Rafiabad =

Borz-e Rafiabad برزرفيع اباد
- Village
- Location within Iran
- Coordinates: 28°54′07″N 58°30′40″E
- Country: Iran
- Province: Kerman
- County: Narmashir
- Bakhsh: Rud Ab
- Rural District: Rud Ab-e Sharqi

Population (2006)
  - Total: 174
- Time zone: UTC+3:30 (IRST)
  - Summer (DST): UTC+4:30 (IRDT)

Borz-e Rafiabad (Persian: برزرفيع اباد, also Romanized as Borz-e Rafī‘ābād; also known as Rafāhābād, Rafī‘ābād, and Refāhābād) is a village in Rud Ab-e Sharqi Rural District, Rud Ab District, Narmashir County, Kerman Province, Iran. At the 2006 census, its population was 174, in 47 families.
