= Zuran, Kerman =

Zuran زوران
- Village
- Location within Iran
- Coordinates: 28°51′34″N 58°30′53″E
- Country: Iran
- Province: Kerman
- County: Narmashir
- Bakhsh: Rud Ab
- Rural District: Rud Ab-e Gharbi

Population (2006)
  - Total: 251
- Time zone: UTC+3:30 (IRST)
  - Summer (DST): UTC+4:30 (IRDT)

Zuran (Persian: زوران, also Romanized as Zūrān and Zooran) is a village in Rud Ab-e Gharbi Rural District, Rud Ab District, Narmashir County, Kerman Province, Iran. At the 2006 census, its population was 251, in 53 families.
