= Karuk, Kerman =

Village in Kerman province, Iran

Karuk Persian: کروک
- Village
- Location within Iran
- Coordinates: 28°50′48″N 58°29′30″E
- Country: Iran
- Province: Kerman
- County: Bam
- District: Baravat
- Rural District: Rud Ab-e Gharbi

Population (2016)
  - Total: 2,257
- Time zone: UTC+3:30 (IRST)

Karuk (Persian: کروک) (Note: Also romanized as Körook, Koruk, and Korūk; also known as Garūk and Kurūk) is a village in, and the capital of, Rud Ab-e Gharbi Rural District of Baravat District, Bam County, Kerman province, Iran.

== Demographics ==
=== Population ===
At the time of the 2006 National Census, the village's population was 1,046 in 279 households, when it was in Rud Ab District. The following census in 2011 counted 2,499 people in 743 households, by which time the rural district had been separated from the district in the formation of Baravat District. The 2016 census measured the population of the village as 2,257 people in 735 households.
