= Chehel Tokhm, Narmashir =

Chehel Tokhm چهل تخم
- Village
- Location within Iran
- Coordinates: 28°59′19″N 58°38′58″E
- Country: Iran
- Province: Kerman
- County: Narmashir
- Bakhsh: Central
- Rural District: Posht Rud

Population (2006)
  - Total: 705
- Time zone: UTC+3:30 (IRST)
  - Summer (DST): UTC+4:30 (IRDT)

Chehel Tokhm (Persian: چهل تخم, also known as Chahil Turkm, Chehel Tokhm-e Bam, and Chehil Tukhm) is a village in Posht Rud Rural District, in the Central District of Narmashir County, Kerman Province, Iran. At the 2006 census, its population was 705, in 181 families.
