= Kamraniyeh-ye Pain =

Kamraniyeh-ye Pain كامرانيه پائين
- Village
- Location within Iran
- Coordinates: 28°55′03″N 58°40′52″E
- Country: Iran
- Province: Kerman
- County: Narmashir
- Bakhsh: Central
- Rural District: Azizabad

Population (2006)
  - Total: 248
- Time zone: UTC+3:30 (IRST)
  - Summer (DST): UTC+4:30 (IRDT)

Kamraniyeh-ye Pain (Persian: كامرانيه پائين, also Romanized as Kāmrānīyeh-ye Pā’īn; also known as Kāmrānī and Kāmrānīyeh) is a village in Azizabad Rural District, in the Central District of Narmashir County, Kerman Province, Iran. At the 2006 census, its population was 248, in 69 families.
