= Baravat =

City in Kerman province, Iran

Baravat Persian: بروات
- City
- Location within Iran
- Coordinates: 29°03′56″N 58°24′14″E
- Country: Iran
- Province: Kerman
- County: Bam
- District: Baravat

Population (2016)
  - Total: 22,761
- Time zone: UTC+3:30 (IRST)

Baravat (Persian: بروات) (Note: Also romanized as Baravāt and Barvat; also known as Borūnābād and Burābād) is a city in, and the capital of, Baravat District of Bam County, Kerman province, Iran.

== Demographics ==
=== Population ===
At the time of the 2006 National Census, the city's population was 15,388 in 3,950 households, when it was in the Central District. The following census in 2011 counted 18,633 people in 5,665 households, by which time Kork and Nartich Rural District had been separated from the Central District, and Rud Ab-e Gharbi Rural District from Rud Ab District, in the formation of Baravat District. The 2016 census measured the population of the city as 22,761 people in 7,386 households, when the city had joined Baravat District.
