= Kahn-e Mahalleh =

Kahn-e Mahalleh or Kahn Mahalleh or Kohan Mahalleh (Persian: كهن محله) may refer to:

- Kahn-e Mahalleh-ye Bala
- Kahn-e Mahalleh-ye Pain
