= Deh Now-e Azizabad =

Village in Kerman province, Iran

Deh Now-e Azizabad Persian: ده نو عزيزاباد
- Village
- Location within Iran
- Coordinates: 28°55′47″N 58°43′44″E
- Country: Iran
- Province: Kerman
- County: Narmashir
- District: Central
- Rural District: Azizabad

Population (2016)
  - Total: 2,261
- Time zone: UTC+3:30 (IRST)

Deh Now-e Azizabad (Persian: ده نوعزيزاباد) (Note: Also romanized as Deh Now-e ‘Azīzābād; also known as ‘Azīzābād and ‘Azīzābād-e Pā’īn) is a village in Azizabad Rural District of the Central District of Narmashir County, Kerman province, Iran.

== Demographics ==
=== Population ===
At the time of the 2006 National Census, the village's population was 1,926 in 440 households, when it was in the former Narmashir District of Bam County. The following census in 2011 counted 2,046 people in 579 households, by which time the district had been separated from the county in the establishment of Narmashir County. The rural district was transferred to the new Central District. The 2016 census measured the population of the village as 2,261 people in 727 households. It was the most populous village in its rural district.
