= Mich, Narmashir =

Mich ميچ
- Village
- Location within Iran
- Coordinates: 28°49′17″N 58°17′29″E
- Country: Iran
- Province: Kerman
- County: Narmashir
- Bakhsh: Rud Ab
- Rural District: Rud Ab-e Gharbi

Population (2006)
  - Total: 387
- Time zone: UTC+3:30 (IRST)
  - Summer (DST): UTC+4:30 (IRDT)

Mich (Persian: ميچ, also Romanized as Mīch; also known as Hīch-e Bālā, Mīch Bālā, Mīch-e Bālā, Mīj, and Mīj-e Bālā) is a village in Rud Ab-e Gharbi Rural District, Rud Ab District, Narmashir County, Kerman Province, Iran. At the 2006 census, its population was 387, in 100 families.
