= Deh-e Arjomand =

Deh-e Arjomand ده ارجمند
- Village
- Location within Iran
- Coordinates: 28°54′41″N 58°43′56″E
- Country: Iran
- Province: Kerman
- County: Narmashir
- Bakhsh: Central
- Rural District: Azizabad

Population (2006)
  - Total: 677
- Time zone: UTC+3:30 (IRST)
  - Summer (DST): UTC+4:30 (IRDT)

Deh-e Arjomand (Persian: ده ارجمند, also Romanized as Deh-e Arjamand and Deh-e Arjmānd; also known as Arjmand and Arjomand) is a village in Azizabad Rural District, in the Central District of Narmashir County, Kerman Province, Iran. At the 2006 census, its population was 677, in 158 families.
