= Dowlatabad-e Ansari =

Village in Kerman province, Iran

Dowlatabad-e Ansari Persian: دولت‌آباد انصاری
- Village
- Location within Iran
- Coordinates: 28°55′50″N 58°27′31″E
- Country: Iran
- Province: Kerman
- County: Bam
- District: Baravat
- Rural District: Rud Ab-e Gharbi

Population (2016)
  - Total: 2,820
- Time zone: UTC+3:30 (IRST)

Dowlatabad-e Ansari (Persian: دولت‌آباد انصاری) (Note: Also romanized as Dowlatābād-e Anşārī; also known as Dowlatābād) is a village in Rud Ab-e Gharbi Rural District of Baravat District, Bam County, Kerman province, Iran.

== Demographics ==
=== Population ===
At the time of the 2006 National Census, the village's population was 1,321 in 316 households, when it was in Rud Ab District. The following census in 2011 counted 1,869 people in 596 households, by which time the rural district had been separated from the district in the formation of Baravat District. The 2016 census measured the population of the village as 2,820 people in 790 households. It was the most populous village in its rural district.
