= Kamraniyeh (disambiguation) =

Kamraniyeh is a village in South Khorasan Province, Iran.

Kamraniyeh (Persian: كامرانيه) may also refer to:

- Kamraniyeh-ye Bala, Kerman Province
- Kamraniyeh-ye Pain, Kerman Province
- Kamranieh, a neighbourhood of Tehran
