= Kodur-e Pain =

Kodur-e Pain كدورپائين
- Village
- Location within Iran
- Coordinates: 28°54′42″N 58°48′04″E
- Country: Iran
- Province: Kerman
- County: Narmashir
- Bakhsh: Central
- Rural District: Azizabad

Population (2006)
  - Total: 165
- Time zone: UTC+3:30 (IRST)
  - Summer (DST): UTC+4:30 (IRDT)

Kodur-e Pain (Persian: كدورپائين, also Romanized as Kodūr-e Pā’īn) is a village in Azizabad Rural District, in the Central District of Narmashir County, Kerman Province, Iran. At the 2006 census, its population was 165, in 30 families.
