= Kodar =

Kodar may refer to:

- Kodar Mountains, a range in Siberia, Russia
- Kodur-e Bala, a village in Iran

== See also ==
- Oja Kodar, a Croatian actress
