= Zuran =

Zuran or Zooran may refer to:

- Žuráň, a hill in the Czech Republic
- Zuran, Kerman, a village in Iran
- Zuran, West Azerbaijan, a village in Iran
