= 2003 Bam earthquake =

Earthquake in Iran

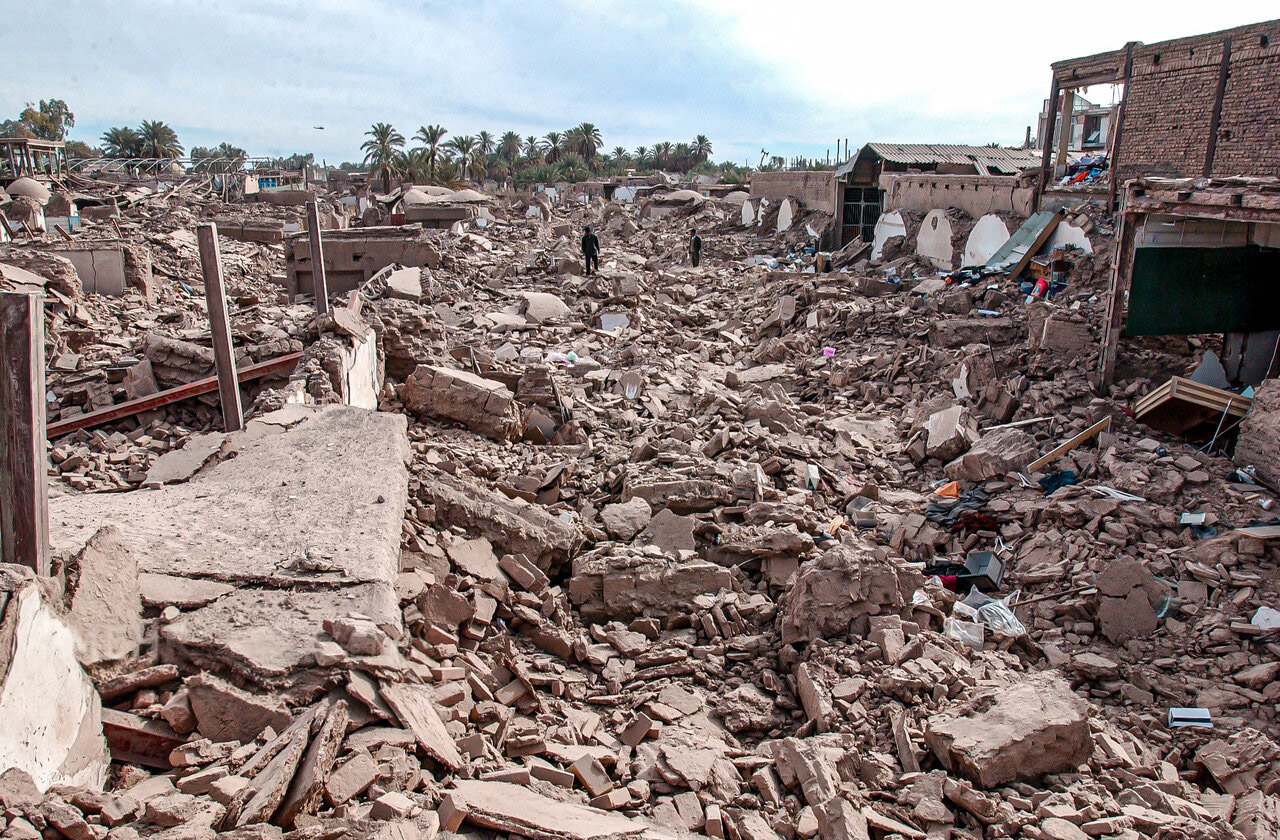
- Destroyed homes in Bam

- Location within Iran
- UTC time: 2003-12-26 01:56:52
- ISC event: 7217667
- USGS-ANSS: ComCat
- Local date: December 26, 2003
- Local time: 05:26:52 IST (UTC+3:30)
- Magnitude: M_{w} 6.6 M_{s} 6.8–7.0
- Depth: 15 km (9.3 mi)
- Epicenter: 28.995°N 58.311°E
- Type: Strike-slip
- Areas affected: Bam County, Kerman province, Iran
- Max. intensity: MMI X (Extreme)
- Peak acceleration: 0.98 g
- Foreshocks: 3 felt
- Aftershocks: 2,789 recorded (as of March 2004) mb 5.1 at 06:36 IST (strongest)
- Casualties: 34,000 fatalities, 200,000 injuries

An earthquake struck the Kerman province of southeastern Iran at 01:56 UTC (5:26 am Iran Standard Time) on December 26, 2003. The M_{w} 6.6 (M_{s} 6.8–7.0) strike-slip shock had a maximum Mercalli intensity of X (Extreme). The earthquake was particularly destructive in Bam and Baravat, with 34,000 fatalities and 200,000 injuries officially reported. It was the deadliest natural disaster globally since the 1999 Vargas tragedy. The effects of the earthquake were exacerbated by the use of mud brick as the standard construction medium; many of the area's structures did not comply with earthquake regulations set in 1989.

Following the earthquake the U.S. offered direct humanitarian assistance to Iran and in return the state promised to comply with an agreement with the International Atomic Energy Agency which supports greater monitoring of its nuclear interests. In total a reported 44 countries sent in personnel to assist in relief operations and 60 countries offered assistance.

Following the earthquake, the Iranian government seriously considered moving the capital of Tehran in fear of an earthquake occurring there. The earthquake had a psychological impact on many of the victims for years afterwards. A new institutional framework in Iran was established to address problems of urban planning and to reconstruct the city of Bam in compliance with strict seismic regulations. This process marked a turning point, as government ministers and international organizations collaborated under this framework with local engineers and local people to organize the systematic rebuilding of the city.

== Background ==
=== Tectonic setting ===
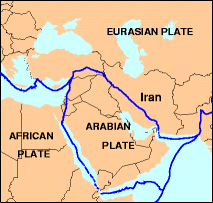
Intersection of tectonic plates in Iran.

Iran suffers from frequent earthquakes, with minor quakes occurring almost daily. This earthquake occurred as a result of stresses generated by movement of one tectonic plate, the Arabian plate, moving northward against another, the Eurasian plate, at approximately 3 centimetres (1 in) per year. The Earth's crust deforms in response to the plate motion in a broad zone spanning the width of Iran and extending north into Turkmenistan. Earthquakes occur as the result of reverse faulting and strike-slip faulting in the zone of deformation.

The preliminary analysis of the pattern of seismic-waves radiating from December 26, 2003, earthquake was consistent with the earthquake having been caused by right-lateral strike-slip motion on a north–south oriented fault. The earthquake occurred in a region within which major north–south, right-lateral, strike-slip faults had been previously mapped, and the epicenter is near the previously mapped, north–south oriented Bam Fault. However, field investigations will be necessary to find if the earthquake occurred on the Bam Fault or on another. The Bam earthquake is 100 kilometres (62 mi) south of the destructive earthquakes of June 11, 1981 (magnitude 6.6, approximately 3,000 deaths) and July 28, 1981 (magnitude 7.3, approximately 1,500 deaths). These earthquakes were caused by a combination of reverse-motion and strike-slip motion on the north–south oriented Gowk fault.

=== City of Bam ===
Bam had a pre-earthquake population of between 97,000 and 142,376. It is one of the most popular tourism areas of Iran, one of its most popular attractions being its 2000-year-old mud-brick Bam Citadel. During the Safavid dynasty (1501–1736) Bam was a large trading hub due to its location on the Silk Road. It gradually declined in significance after the Afghans invaded in 1722, serving as an army camp until its abandonment in 1932. The city became a tourist attraction in 1953, when restoration of Bam's Old Quarter began.

=== Iranian earthquake education ===
There was little earthquake education in Iran although the International Institute of Earthquake Engineering and Seismology established a Public Education Department in 1990 to improve "the safety, preventing, and culture against the earthquake among all groups of the society". In October 2003, Bahram Akasheh, professor of geophysics at Tehran University, called the effects of public ignorance about earthquakes "poisonous".

== Earthquake ==
According to the United States Geological Survey (USGS), the earthquake had a moment magnitude (M_{wc}) of 6.6, and was located 12 km (7.5 mi) southwest of Baravat and 13 km (8.1 mi) south-southwest of Bam. On the seismic magnitude scale (M_{s}), it measured 6.8 and 7.0, according to the National Geophysical Data Center and the China Earthquake Administration, respectively. It struck at 01:56:52 UTC (05:26:52 IST) on 26 December 2003, at a depth of 15 km (9.3 mi). It had a maximum Modified Mercalli intensity (MMI) of X (Extreme); at Bam, the intensity was MMI IX (Violent), with shaking of MMI VIII (Severe) estimated at Baravat and V (Moderate) at Kerman. Bam also recorded a maximum peak ground acceleration (pga) of 0.98 g. It is believed to be the largest earthquake to hit the Bam area in more than 2,000 years. The day before, on 25 December, two foreshocks struck Bam and were felt by residents of the city at 15:00 and 22:00 IST respectively. The following day, a third foreshock struck at 04:33, followed by the mainshock almost an hour later. At least 2,789 aftershocks were recorded by March 2004, the strongest measuring mb 5.1, which struck at 06:36 IST.

The rupture length of the earthquake was estimated to be around 24 km (15 mi). More than half of the quake was produced from its southern segment of approximately 13 kilometres (8 mi), where the slip reached a maximum of up to 2.7 metres (8.9 ft) resulting in a large stress drop of at least 6 MPa. Optical remote sensing data shows that the Bam fault is not a single fault but consists of a 4–5 km (2.5–3.1 mi) wide fault system with the main branch running between the cities of Bam and Baravat. The fault ruptured by the Bam earthquake is believed to stretch the along northwest branch of this fault system from Bam southward. Based on these results, scientists suggest that the Bam earthquake ruptured a hidden fault and that in this process an unusually strong asperity was involved, causing the widespread devastation of the tremor.

== Damage and casualties ==
Before and after pictures of the Bam Citadel

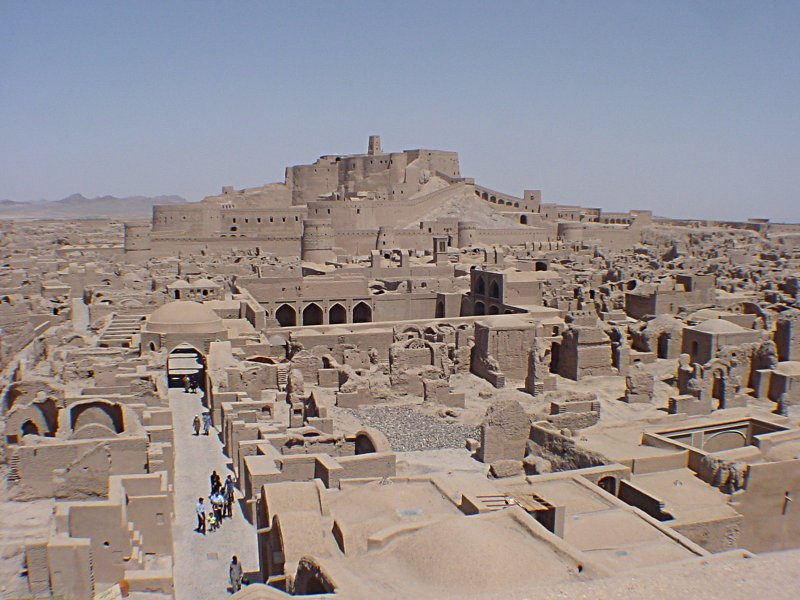
Before (pictured September 2003)

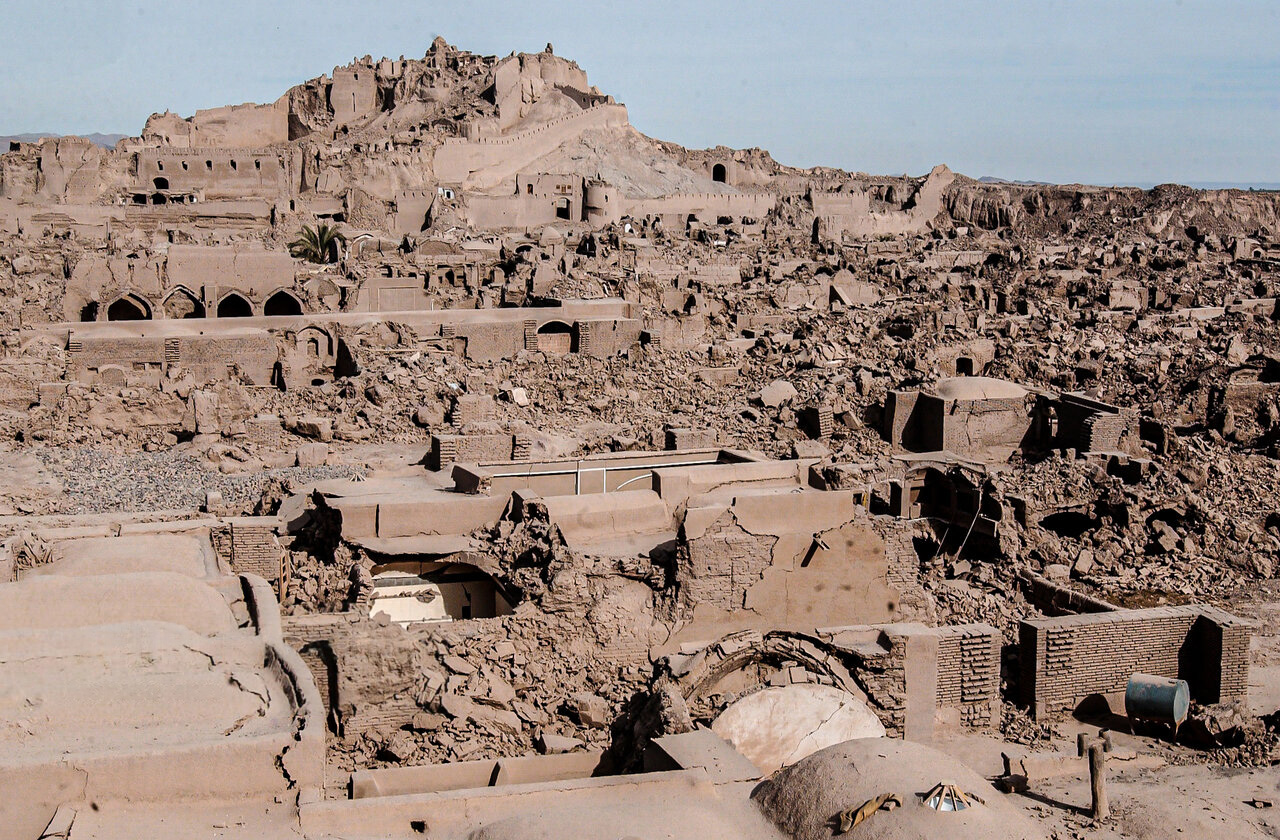
After (pictured in January 2004)

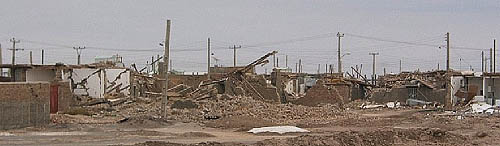
Destruction in Bam

For years, the death toll was heavily disputed. Initially, local media estimated up to 70,000 fatalities, before a death toll of 56,230 was confirmed on 17 January 2004, a figure later revised to 26,271 deaths by the Statistical Center of Iran. The BBC added that confusion regarding the true death toll arose as rescue groups had counted the bodies of victims twice. On 26 December 2020, exactly 17 years after the earthquake, Iran's Crisis Management Organization confirmed 34,000 fatalities and 200,000 injuries. In terms of human loss the quake was the worst to occur in Iranian history. The BBC reported that a large number of victims were crushed while sleeping. At least 10,000 students and 1,200 teachers were among the dead. This caused a significant problem for the local education system. At least 5,054 children were orphaned and 400 people were left disabled in the aftermath of the earthquake.

Up to 95% of buildings and infrastructure in the Bam area were either damaged or destroyed, with 90% of structures severely damaged or collapsed and 70% of houses being completely destroyed, plus 70–90% of Bam's residential areas. Some areas of the city were entirely reduced to rubble, while all 122 health centers and three hospitals collapsed or were badly damaged. Not a single house was standing in nearby Baravat, where 1,112 deaths, 36 missing and 578 injuries were recorded. In total, approximately 53,000 buildings, including 25,000 in Bam, 24,000 in villages within a 10 km radius of the city and 4,000 in Baravat were destroyed. Most of the destruction was concentrated within a 16 kilometres (9.9 mi) radius around Bam. Electricity and water supplies were cut by the earthquake. An important regional center during the 16th and 17th centuries, Bam contained many buildings that were not constructed to survive such ruptures. Many houses in Bam were homemade, and its owners did not use skilled labor or proper building materials to resist earthquakes in the construction. These were often built in the traditional mud-brick style. Mohsen Aboutorabi, professor of architecture at the University of Central England, demonstrated the lack of good building materials by banging two bricks together in Bam, resulting in cracking. On the other hand, Iranian regulations laid down in the 1989 Iran seismic code were better enforced in high rise buildings and skyscrapers.

One reason for the large number of casualties was that when the walls of homes began to fall down, the heavy roofs would collapse, leaving few air pockets in them. The dust and lack of oxygen contributed to the suffocation of survivors. The Iranian government promised to prosecute anyone who violated building regulations, even setting up a special unit to deal with the issue.

A study of 210 victims showed that on average, each person had spent 1.9 hours beneath the rubble of destroyed buildings. Among the victims, approximately 19 had compartment syndrome, 32 contracted impaired renal function, and fractures among their bones were common. As a result of these fractures neural injuries were also common.

A large number of schools were affected by the tremor. An estimated 1,200 teachers and 10,000 students were killed. Ali Zang-Abadi, head of education in Bam, described the state of pupils and teachers as "badly need[ing] psychological help because they are morally devastated". Around January 5, teachers were being registered to resume educating.

== Response ==
=== Iran–United States relations ===
Relations between the United States and Iran thawed due to the earthquakes. U.S.-Iranian relations had been tense during the early years of the George W. Bush presidency, having reached a low after the "axis of evil" speech given by President George W. Bush. However, following the earthquake, White House spokesman Scott McClellan spoke on behalf of President Bush: "Our thoughts and prayers are with those who were injured and with the families of those who were killed."

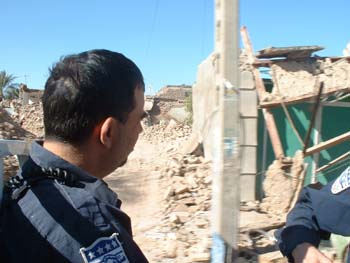
Fairfax County, Virginia Urban Search and Rescue squad inspect earthquake damage in Bam

The U.S. offered direct humanitarian assistance to Iran which was initially rejected but accepted later. On December 30 an 81-member emergency response team was deployed to Iran via U.S. military aircraft which consisted of search and rescue squads, aid coordinators, and medical support resulting in the first U.S. military airplanes to land in Iran for more than 20 years. Sanctions were temporarily relieved to help the rescue effort.

In return, Iran promised to comply with an agreement with the International Atomic Energy Agency which supported better monitoring of its nuclear interests. This led U.S. Secretary of State Colin Powell to suggest direct talks with Iran in the future, however, he also said that the U.S. was still concerned about other Iranian issues such as the prospect of terrorism and the country's support of Hamas.

Reaction to the help and rescue from the U.S. was mixed. It was well received by physicians and civilians at the scene, however, in contrast to this support, IRNA, the state-controlled radio in Iran, accused the United States of illegal interference in internal matters. Khatami, while not criticizing U.S. aid, had expressed regret about the politicization of this event. Interior Minister Abdolvahed Mousavi Lari accepted U.S. assistance but rejected Israeli assistance due to the political tensions between the two countries and Iran's lack of recognition of the state of Israel.

=== Relief ===
Bam was described as "literally a rubble pile" by the U.S. relief coordinator, Bill Garvelink. Iranian President Mohammad Khatami called the earthquake a "national tragedy" and urged all Iranians to help its victims. The disaster brought in prompt pledges of aid, resulting in President Khatami's statement that the "spirit of humanity and kindness is alive." The Supreme Leader Ayatollah Ali Khamenei visited the damaged areas on December 29, urging all Iranians and international organizations to help in any way possible.

On January 8, the International Federation of the Red Cross and the U.N. launched an international appeal for relief together at a conference in Bam, appealing for $42 million and $31.3 million respectively. In response a reported 44 countries sent in personnel to assist in operations and 60 countries had offered assistance in the aftermath of the earthquake. By January 15, the U.N. World Food Program (WFP) had distributed approximately 100,000 rations of food. The United Nations sent experts to coordinate the relief effort. The Red Crescent set up tents to house survivors.

The People's Republic of China was one of the first countries to supply aid. Upon hearing of the quake, it immediately sent a 43-member rescue squad. In total, its government donated 15 million yuan (US$1.81 million). Many individuals and companies also donated money and/or supplies.

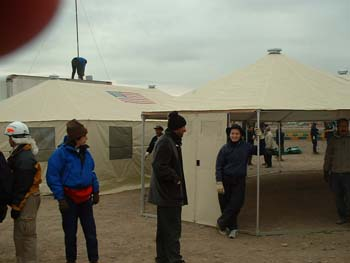
Tents being constructed in the United Nations compound in Bam

The 81-member emergency response team worked with an 11-member Fairfax County USAR Task Force (VA-TF1), 57 member International Medical/Surgical Response Team (IMSuRT), and a 6-member Management Support Team (MST) from the Federal Emergency Management Agency (FEMA). USAID and OFDA sent in five airlifts of supplies for relief, including 1,146 tents, 4,448 kitchen sets, approximately 12,500 blankets, and 430 rolls of plastic sheeting amounting to a cost of $543,605. The U.S. Department of Defense (DOD) sent in seven C-130s with approximately 68 tonnes of medical supplies and 2,000 blankets also assisting in relief.

From December 31 to January 4, the IMSuRT field hospital treated 727 patients, including surgeries and post-trauma cases of shock. The IMSuRT hospital closed on January 5, and from then on the International Federation of the Red Cross (IFRC) field hospital took the responsibility, reporting 550 outpatients per day on January 13. That day, the IFRC announced that the Iranian Red Crescent Society (IRCS) had sent in 75 volunteers, organized in 11 teams to treat earthquake survivors for shock and to provide psychological support.

During the nights following the earthquake, the temperatures would drop to "bitterly cold" extremes, effectively killing some survivors. Many of these individuals were living in unheated tents among the rubble which forced the coordinators to move thousands of families to heated camps on the outskirts of Bam. Unfortunately, this action was met with some resistance and resulted in many residents to stay in place. The Iranian government was, conversely, criticized for not supplying enough tents. Those that owned motorized vehicles were met with jammed traffic going both ways through Bam. Survivors loaded their belongings to move elsewhere while relief supplies, volunteers, and relatives were arriving. In some areas, looters stole food from warehouses and local markets, causing the police force to react to stop further destabilization of the rescue efforts.

On December 29, a baby girl named Nassin was discovered alive under the rubble in her deceased mother's arms. China Daily called it "a rare moment of joy amid the devastation of Iran's worst earthquake for years." Around this time, relief operations had begun to shift from finding survivors to caring for them. Rescue workers began to slow their efforts, although three individuals were discovered alive shortly after. Water and electricity were restored to most parts of the city by then as well.

One of the most notable rescues was that of 97-year-old Sharbānou Māzandarānī (شهربانو مازندرانی in Persian), who was trapped in her home for eight days until she was rescued unhurt on January 3. Rescue workers took three hours to dig her out after sniffer dogs found her. Renewed media interest came to Bam on January 8, when a man was pulled out of the rubble alive. The chances of finding more living survivors following this were reportedly very slim.

An Iranian navy helicopter crashed 30 miles (48 km) southwest of Bam on December 28 after making a delivery of tents and blankets. It was headed toward Bandar Abbas as it went down for unknown reasons. On deck were two pilots and a third person, none of whom survived. The helicopter was one of more than 500 who delivered aid to the Bam region.

== Aftermath ==
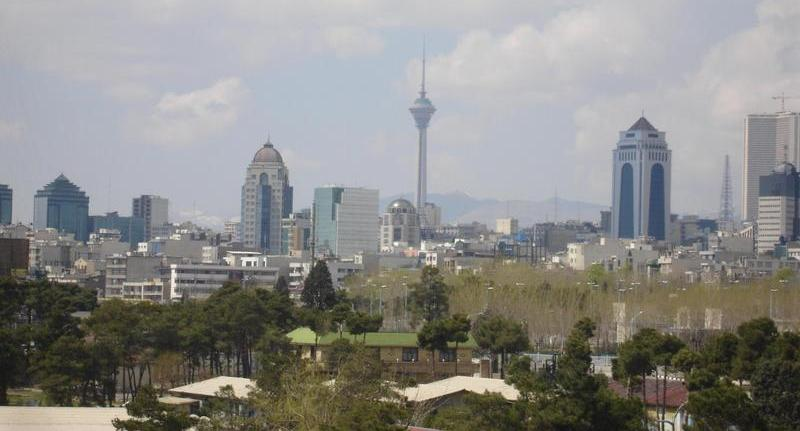
The Iranian government considered moving the capital of Tehran after the earthquake in response to scientific predictions

After the earthquake, the Iranian government considered moving the state capital from Tehran to another location for fear of a crippling event similar to what had just befallen Bam. Tehran lies on a major fault which scientists have predicted may suffer from a devastating earthquake similar to that of Bam in the near future. The most cited example for the new capital was Isfahan, a city in central Iran that had previously served as capital until it was moved to Tehran in 1788.

The year 2003 was later declared to be the deadliest earthquake year globally since 1990, primarily due to the Bam earthquake which contributed almost 75% of the Earth's earthquake fatalities for that year.

=== Reconstruction ===
==== Planning ====
In January 2004, the United Nations estimated that a reconstruction of Bam would cost between US$700 million and $1 billion. It called on the international community to provide money for this endeavor. The Iranian government had announced over state television that it had earmarked roughly $410 million for this reconstruction.

Given the failure of the mud brick buildings and lack of compliance with the 1989 Iranian seismic code, the reconstruction in Bam paid special attention to using earthquake-durable materials. Dr. Hamid Eskander who was in charge of the Bam reconstruction effort said "There will be no more mud bricks in Bam. The new design will have to take into account proper seismic design techniques and parameters. When you go with the old-style buildings and old-style engineering you're looking for trouble so we're going to change it now." Horst Indorf, a representative for permanent shelter issues from ASB, a German non-government organization, frowned on the use of iron structures in the city given its movement during an earthquake, saying "The best architecture for this area is clay brick (with nets) but this means 80 to 90 cm thick walls and a very good insulated roof".

The Iranian Government established the Guiding Office for the Recovery of Bam (GO), consisting of a panel of 11 members, with the Minister of Housing and Urban Development as the chairman. The G.O. played a key role in the reconstruction progress by appointing consulting architects to plan, analyze and review possible strategies in the urban redesign for enhanced earthquake resistance in the future. The general community affected by the earthquake were given the liberty to actively participate in the planning, design and construction process, with householders often contributing in the reconstruction by selecting their own designs and cooperating with the architects and contractors to ensure a desirable and effective redevelopment.

Also established was the Council of Architecture and Urban Development (CAUD), a council of eight prominent professionals including HF members, architects, engineers, and businessman. CAUD played a role in the governance and finance of the reconstruction by ensuring that new structures complied with guidelines and by regulating bank loans and credit for the newly built structures. The council inaugurated the Bam Sustainable Reconstruction Manifesto, a further committee of experts in reconstruction to ensure the planning and building was conducted in coordination with the seismic code but also to retain the sense of urban identity of Bam during these efforts.

The United Nations Human Settlements Programme, UN-HABITAT, launched a project to address the issue of earthquake-resistant structures on March 1, 2004, in Bam. The UN worked together with the government councils and the community to overlook the reconstruction process which also involved the Islamic Revolutionary Housing Foundation. The UN Habitat project was scheduled to last six months and was estimated to cost $400,000.

==== Problems of redevelopment ====
While the established councils and efforts at collaborative planning were set up during the reconstruction phase, it has been considerably more difficult for the many stakeholders in the building to gain consensus on architectural decision making, given diverse and often conflicting interests. In reality actual collaboration was more limited than initially foreseen, and international support and involvement in relation to actual reconstruction was low. In addition to this, the reconstruction plan has been markedly slow to implement. It took a considerable amount of time for the planning company to prepare the city's new overall urban plan, and two years after the disaster was still not adopted and authorised for implementation by the councils involved. This was largely due to a conflict of interest between them and the contractors and the differing architectural demands of people at a local level. Consequently, the actual reconstruction was initiated without acknowledgment to the overall urban strategic master plan, resulting in the discarding of many of the original proposals and scope for collaboration. Notably the city reconstruction planners have had serious difficulties in regards to the planning of the streets and their width, which has seen them purchase over 1200 properties to facilitate and help shape the infrastructural redevelopment process. One of the factors that the re-developers failed to take into account was therefore social factors such as vulnerability, resulting in a slow rebuilding process.

==== Successes and benefits of redevelopment ====
Although the reconstruction process was prolonged and planning was often difficult to coordinate and approve, the post-earthquake reconstruction of Bam is considered by the stakeholders in the process to be of monumental importance and influence in the future for the way in which reconstruction programs in the country operate. During the reconstruction of Bam, the engineers significantly raised the standards of building and the obligations of the 1989 Seismic building code were closely followed.

Economically, the redevelopment of Bam following the earthquake provided the city with considerable opportunities for growth, and culturally, despite the extensive damage caused by the earthquake, has seen many continuities and even an advancement in these traditions. Notably the redesign and rebuilding of the city greatly improved the irrigation system and its quality, crucial to the date industry in Bam. During the reconstruction process, the improvement of the irrigation system beyond its original state increased the quality and quantity of production, and the rapidity of the process prevented the collapse of date production following the earthquake. The growth of the date industry since the earthquake in Bam has seen the expansion of the palm orchards, and an increase in investment and employment.

=== Medical impact ===
Psychologically, the earthquake had a profound impact on its victims and not just in the immediate aftermath. As a result of the quake, two hospitals in Bam collapsed leaving the remaining hospitals to be overcrowded. Emergency centers were set up to care for the injured, though many centers did not have enough room to do so. Of all of Bam's health workers, half were killed in the rupture. The World Health Organization (WHO) appealed for $4 million in medical relief. One of the priorities in this operation was to help mental health patients, many of whom were traumatized over the experience. A situation report released by the U.N. Disaster Assessment Coordination Team noted a rise in post-traumatic stress disorder and depression.

Another effect of the rupture on the medical community was the disruption of drug trafficking. Before the earthquake in Bam, roughly 20% of the population over 15 was addicted. Syringes with opium were supplied to drug addicts in the aftermath.

The Iranian Red Crescent Society (IRCS), who had begun a planned six month recuperation programme in the aftermath, were still present in Bam a year later. In September 2004, the treatment of mental disorders associated with the disaster was still at a high level, with one counselling centre in Bam receiving 129 new Post Traumatic Stress Disorder patients in that month. In December 2004, Mohammed Mukhier, head of delegation for the International Federation of Red Cross and Red Crescent Societies in Iran said about the situation, "Twelve months later, signs of the devastation are still evident, not just in the collapsed buildings but in peoples' minds. Integrating psychological support into the relief effort right from the beginning of a sudden-onset disaster is a model that could be used more widely. Our experience in Iran can be used in response to future disasters elsewhere, and we should take care to provide that support both to the victims and to rescue workers."

The psychological programme assessed 20,000 people, 9,300 of which were identified as needing mental support, with more than 5,600 people going through individual or group counseling as a result. The Iranian Red Crescent Society received support from the Red Cross societies of Denmark, Iceland, and Italy but the main source of funding was provided by ECHO, the humanitarian office of the European Union. The programme not only provided conventional medical therapy, but also provided affected people with leisure facilities such as painting, sewing and computer classes as a treatment.

Although the permanent hospital in Bam was rebuilt, the temporary hospital is stored in preparation for a future emergency response to a disaster, not only in Iran but in the regional area. In response to the earthquake, the International Federation of the Red Cross mobilized international funds and resources to assist the Iranian Red Crescent in vastly improving its environmental disaster response strategies which has seen the construction of an urban health center and ten schools with a formal training programme for its relief officers, and a road rescue station, completed in late 2005.

==== Rise of illicit drugs and fall-off working people of Bam ====
After the earthquake, survivors began using opium on a large scale which was easily accessible due to Bam's location on a trade route for drugs coming from Afghanistan and Pakistan. By 2006, over 50% of men and roughly 15% of women were addicted with the youngest addict allegedly being 11 years of age. Construction workers have historically been large injectors, and the rise in addiction may have been attributed to this group passing needles on to the public. An anonymous UNICEF worker claimed that drugs were slowing reconstruction and lessening motivation.

=== Films based on the earthquake ===
Colors of Memory, released in 2008, tells the story of a surgeon who returns home to Bam after living in Germany for 33 years. Dr. Parsa arrives in Tehran to perform a complex operation, where he notices a family friend named "Quanati" who urges him to come back to his hometown of Bam for assistance. The film was praised by Canadian Online Explorer as "both celebratory and heartbreaking" and urged Iranians "to bring tissues."

Voices of Bam, released in 2006, is a Dutch-made documentary film about the incident.

== See also ==
- List of earthquakes in 2003
- List of earthquakes in Iran
