= Golkhani Rural District =

Rural district in Sistan and Baluchestan province, Iran

Golkhani Rural District Persian: دهستان گلخانی
- Rural District
- Location within Iran
- Coordinates: 31°14′19″N 61°01′57″E
- Country: Iran
- Province: Sistan and Baluchestan
- County: Nimruz
- District: Saberi
- Capital: Golkhani
- Time zone: UTC+3:30 (IRST)

Golkhani Rural District (Persian: دهستان گلخانی) is in Saberi District of Nimruz County, Sistan and Baluchestan province, Iran. Its capital is the village of Golkhani, whose population at the time of the 2016 National Census was 2,064 people in 501 households.

== History ==
In 2013, Posht Ab District was separated from Zabol County in the establishment of Nimruz County. Golkhani Rural District was created in Saberi District after the 2016 census.
