= Bazi =

Bazi may refer to:

- Bazi (king), legendary Mesopotamian king
- Eight Characters (Chinese: 八字; pinyin: Bāzì), Chinese astrological concept
- Bazi Rural District, Central District, Nimruz County, Sistan and Baluchestan province, Iran
- Bazi Township in Pingwu County, Sichuan, China
- Robert Weiß (pilot) (1920–1944), nicknamed Bazi, Austrian-born German World War II ace

== See also ==
- Baazi (disambiguation)
