= Kodur-e Bala =

Kodur-e Bala كدوربالا
- Village
- Location within Iran
- Coordinates: 28°55′05″N 58°47′45″E
- Country: Iran
- Province: Kerman
- County: Narmashir
- Bakhsh: Central
- Rural District: Azizabad

Population (2006)
  - Total: 331
- Time zone: UTC+3:30 (IRST)
  - Summer (DST): UTC+4:30 (IRDT)

Kodur-e Bala (Persian: كدوربالا, also Romanized as Kodūr-e Bālā; also known as Kādar, Kodar, and Kodūr) is a village in Azizabad Rural District, in the Central District of Narmashir County, Kerman Province, Iran. At the 2006 census, its population was 331, in 83 families.
