= Mordan =

Mordan may refer to:

- Sampson Mordan (1790-1843), British inventor
- Mordan, Iran, a village in Kerman Province, Iran
