= Mij, Iran =

Mij (Persian: ميج) in Iran may refer to:

- Mij, Fars
- Mij, Kerman
- Mij, Mazandaran
