= Qaemabad, Sistan and Baluchestan =

Village in Sistan and Baluchestan province, Iran

Qaemabad Persian: قائم‌آباد
- Village
- Location within Iran
- Coordinates: 31°02′31″N 61°27′34″E
- Country: Iran
- Province: Sistan and Baluchestan
- County: Nimruz
- District: Saberi
- Rural District: Qaemabad

Population (2016)
  - Total: 1,139
- Time zone: UTC+3:30 (IRST)

Qaemabad (Persian: قائم‌آباد) is a village in Qaemabad Rural District of Saberi District, Nimruz County, Sistan and Baluchestan province, Iran, serving as capital of both the district and rural district.

== Demographics ==
=== Population ===
At the time of the 2006 National Census, the village's population was 1,021 in 206 households, when it was in the former Posht Ab District of Zabol County. The following census in 2011 counted 1,096 people in 282 households. The 2016 census measured the population of the village as 1,139 people in 312 households, by which time the district had been separated from the county in the establishment of Nimruz County. The rural district was transferred to the new Saberi District.
