= Ziaabad (disambiguation) =

Ziaabad is a city in Qazvin Province, Iran.

Ziaabad or Zeyaabad or Ziyaabad (Persian: ضيااباد) may also refer to:

- Ziaabad, Golestan
- Ziaabad, Kerman
- Ziaabad, Komijan, Markazi Province
- Ziaabad, Shazand, Markazi Province
- Ziaabad District, in Qazvin Province
