= Kala Shah Duzd =

Archaeological site in Iran

Kala Shah Duzd is an archaeological site in Iran. Kala Shah Duzd, first mentioned by Isidorus of Charax, was probably known in antiquity as Neh and was on the direct line between Bandar Abbas and the Khorasan region. It was the first arable area that caravans from Narmashir encountered.

The site was described by Major Percy Molesworth Sykes as follows:

is built on a hill only accessible on the west side, and is carefully guarded by numerous sangiars. The track about half-way up enters the line of hastioned wall by passing under a little fort which was almost a duplicate of ICala Zarri. Above, lying up the steep hill-side, were thousands of houses, built of unhewn scone fitted together with mortar, the summit being some 600 feet above the plain. The other faces are perpendicular, but the water-supply seemed insufficient, there being only tanks, so far as could be seen. The area covered was quite four acres, and these are certainty the most important ruins which I have examined in Eastern Persia.

The name means Castle of the Thief King. The town is the subject of a legend. The name of the site translates as "Castle of the thief king", and the legend tells of a battle between the thief king and Rustam the hero of the story. In the story the duel went on till their strength and weapons were exhausted. When a truce of sorts was called for the combatants to compose themselves. Rastum drank sparingly while the Thief King over indulged and was then easily overpowered.

The ruins are built on a hill accessible on the west side.
