= Khudrowsazi =

Khudrowsazi خودروسازي
- Village
- Country: Iran
- Province: Kerman
- County: Bam
- Bakhsh: Central
- Rural District: Kork and Nartich

Population (2006)
  - Total: 961
- Time zone: UTC+3:30 (IRST)
  - Summer (DST): UTC+4:30 (IRDT)

Khudrowsazi (Persian: خودروسازي, also Romanized as Khūdrowsāzī) is a village in Kork and Nartich Rural District, in the Central District of Bam County, Kerman Province, Iran. At the 2006 census, its population was 961, in 323 families.
