= Arjomand (disambiguation) =

Arjomand is a city in Tehran Province, Iran.

Arjomand may also refer to:

- Arjomand, Kerman
- Arjomand District, an administrative subdivision of Tehran Province, Iran
- Dariush Arjomand (b. 1944), Iranian actor
- Homa Arjomand (b. 1952), Iranian political activist
- Saïd Amir Arjomand, American professor
