= Espigan =

Village in Kerman province, Iran

Espigan Persian: اسپيگان
- Village
- Location within Iran
- Coordinates: 29°07′32″N 58°21′30″E
- Country: Iran
- Province: Kerman
- County: Bam
- District: Baravat
- Rural District: Kork and Nartich

Population (2016)
  - Total: 4,476
- Time zone: UTC+3:30 (IRST)

Espigan (Persian: اسپيگان) (Note: Also romanized as Espīgān; also known as Esfīkān and Espīkān) is a village in Kork and Nartich Rural District of Baravat District, Bam County, Kerman province, Iran.

== Demographics ==
=== Population ===
At the time of the 2006 National Census, the village's population was 3,449 in 916 households, when it was in the Central District. The following census in 2011 counted 4,711 people in 1,468 households, by which time the rural district had been separated from the district in the formation of Baravat District. The 2016 census measured the population of the village as 4,476 people in 1,371 households. It was the most populous village in its rural district.
