= Sefidabeh District =

District in Sistan and Baluchestan province, Iran

Sefidabeh District Persian: بخش سفیدابه
- District
- Location within Iran
- Coordinates: 30°49′19″N 60°31′40″E
- Country: Iran
- Province: Sistan and Baluchestan
- County: Nimruz
- Capital: Sefidabeh
- Time zone: UTC+3:30 (IRST)

Sefidabeh District (Persian: بخش سفیدابه) is in Nimruz County, Sistan and Baluchestan province, Iran. Its capital is the village of Sefidabeh, whose population at the time of the 2016 National Census was 3,434 people in 707 households.

== History ==
In 2013, Posht Ab District was separated from Zabol County in the establishment of Nimruz County, which was divided into two districts of two rural districts each, with Adimi as its capital and only city. After the 2016 National Census, Sefidabeh Rural District was separated from Saberi District in the formation of Sefidabeh District.

== Demographics ==
=== Administrative divisions ===
Sefidabeh District
Administrative Divisions
Madeh Kariz RD
Sefidabeh RD
RD = Rural District
