= Deh-e Shur =

Deh-e Shur or Deh Shur (Persian: ده شور) may refer to:

- Deh-e Shur Akhund, Kuhbanan, Kerman Province
- Deh-e Shur, Narmashir, Kerman Province
- Deh-e Shur, South Khorasan
