= Nartich =

Nartich نارتيچ
- Village
- Location within Iran
- Coordinates: 29°07′16″N 58°26′05″E
- Country: Iran
- Province: Kerman
- County: Bam
- Bakhsh: Central
- Rural District: Kork and Nartich

Population (2006)
  - Total: 842
- Time zone: UTC+3:30 (IRST)
  - Summer (DST): UTC+4:30 (IRDT)

Nartich (Persian: نارتيچ, also Romanized as Nārtīch; also known as Nartieh, Nārtīj, Nātīj, and Tārtīch) is a village in Kork and Nartich Rural District, in the Central District of Bam County, Kerman Province, Iran. At the 2006 census, its population was 842, in 216 families.
