= Adimi Rural District =

Rural district in Sistan and Baluchestan province, Iran

Adimi Rural District Persian: دهستان ادیمی
- Rural District
- Location within Iran
- Coordinates: 31°09′13″N 61°25′16″E
- Country: Iran
- Province: Sistan and Baluchestan
- County: Nimruz
- District: Central
- Capital: Adimi

Population (2016)
  - Total: 17,745
- Time zone: UTC+3:30 (IRST)

Adimi Rural District (Persian: دهستان ادیمی) is in the Central District of Nimruz County, Sistan and Baluchestan province, Iran. It is administered from the city of Adimi.

== Demographics ==
=== Population ===
At the time of the 2006 National Census, the rural district's population (as a part of the former Posht Ab District of Zabol County) was 15,157 in 3,524 households. There were 17,820 inhabitants in 4,291 households at the following census of 2011. The 2016 census measured the population of the rural district as 17,745 in 5,015 households, by which time the district had been separated from the county in the establishment of Nimruz County. The rural district was transferred to the new Central District. The most populous of its 50 villages was Faqir Lashkari, with 1,954 people.
