= Rud-e Posht =

Rud-e Posht or Rud Posht or Rudposht (Persian: رودپشت) may refer to:

- Rud Posht, Bandar-e Anzali, Gilan Province
- Bala Rudposht, Lahijan County, Gilan Province
- Rud Posht, Rasht, Gilan Province
- Rudposht, Mahmudabad, Mazandaran Province
- Rud Posht, Sari, Mazandaran Province
- Rud-e Posht, Tonekabon, Mazandaran Province

== See also ==
- Posht Rud (disambiguation)
