= Nezamshahr =

City in Kerman province, Iran

Nezamshahr Persian: نظام‌شهر
- City
- Location within Iran
- Coordinates: 28°54′54″N 58°32′58″E
- Country: Iran
- Province: Kerman
- County: Narmashir
- District: Rud Ab

Population (2016)
  - Total: 2,426
- Time zone: UTC+3:30 (IRST)

Nezamshahr (Persian: نظام‌شهر) (Note: Also romanized as Naz̧mshahr and Nez̧āmshahr; formerly, Nezamabad (نظام آباد), also romanized as Naz̧mābād and Nez̧āmābād; also known as Nizāmābād and Nizāmshahr) is a city in, and the capital of, Rud Ab District of Narmashir County, Kerman province, Iran. It also serves as the administrative center for Rud Ab-e Sharqi Rural District.

== Demographics ==
=== Population ===
At the time of the 2006 National Census, the city's population was 1,757 in 465 households, when it was in Bam County. The following census in 2011 counted 2,049 people in 537 households, by which time the district had been separated from the county in the establishment of Narmashir County. The 2016 census measured the population of the city as 2,426 people in 743 households.
