= Poshtrud, Bam =

Village in Kerman province, Iran

Poshtrud Persian: پشت رود
- Village
- Location within Iran
- Coordinates: 29°07′31″N 58°23′13″E
- Country: Iran
- Province: Kerman
- County: Bam
- District: Baravat
- Rural District: Kork and Nartich

Population (2016)
  - Total: 4,353
- Time zone: UTC+3:30 (IRST)

Poshtrud (Persian: پشت رود) (Note: Also romanized as Posht Rood, Posht Rud, and Posht Rūd; also known as Kushrūd) is a village in, and the capital of, Kork and Nartich Rural District of Baravat District, Bam County, Kerman province, Iran.

== Demographics ==
=== Population ===
At the time of the 2006 National Census, the village's population was 2,062 in 543 households, when it was in the Central District. The following census in 2011 counted 4,055 people in 1,152 households, by which time the rural district had been separated from the district in the formation of Baravat District. The 2016 census measured the population of the village as 4,353 people in 1,200 households.
