= Kodur (East) =

Village in Andhra Pradesh, India

- Village
- Interactive map of Kodur (East)
- Location within Andhra Pradesh
- Coordinates: 13°57′33″N 79°21′10″E
- Country: India
- State: Andhra Pradesh
- District: Tirupati
- Mandal: Kodur

Government
  - Type: Sarpanch

Area
  - Total: 47.24 km^{2} (18.24 sq mi)
- Elevation: 185 m (607 ft)

Population (2011)
  - Total: 39,408
  - Density: 834.2/km^{2} (2,161/sq mi)

Languages
  - Official: Telugu
- Time zone: UTC+5:30 (IST)
- PIN: 516101
- STD code: 08566
- Vehicle registration: AP-04

Kodur (East) is a village and the administrative center of Kodur Mandal, Tirupati District, Andhra Pradesh, India. It is located near the district boundary with Kadapa district and Annamayya district. As of 2011, it has a total population of 39,408.

Prior to the reorganization of districts under Andhra Pradesh in 2022, this village was part of YSR District along with the rest of the Kodur Mandal.

== Geography ==
Kodur (East) is located on the south of Penna River. National Highway 716 passes through the village. It covers an area of 4724 hectares.

== Demographics ==
According to the 2011 Indian Census, Kodur (East) has 9,326 households. Among the 39,408 inhabitants, 19,886 are male and 19,522 are female. The total literacy rate is 65.46%, with 14,455 of the male population and 11,342 of the female population being literate. The census location code of the village is 593719.
