= Momenabad Rural District (Narmashir County) =

Rural district in Kerman province, Iran

Momenabad Rural District Persian: دهستان مؤمن‌آباد
- Rural District
- Location within Iran
- Coordinates: 28°59′37″N 58°33′58″E
- Country: Iran
- Province: Kerman
- County: Narmashir
- District: Rud Ab
- Capital: Mowmenabad

Population (2016)
  - Total: 5,225
- Time zone: UTC+3:30 (IRST)

Momenabad Rural District (Persian: دهستان مؤمن‌آباد) is in Rud Ab District of Narmashir County, Kerman province, Iran. Its capital is the village of Mowmenabad.

== History ==
After the 2006 National Census, Rud Ab District was separated from Bam County in the establishment of Narmashir County, and Momenabad Rural District was created in the district.

== Demographics ==
=== Population ===
At the time of the 2011 census, the rural district's population was 5,116 in 1,428 households. The 2016 census measured the population of the rural district as 5,225 in 1,557 households. The most populous of its 12 villages was Mowmenabad, with 1,711 people.
