= Qaemabad Rural District =

Qaemabad Rural District (Persian: دهستان قائم آباد) may refer to:

- Qaemabad Rural District (Nimruz County), Sistan and Baluchestan province
- Qaemabad Rural District (Shahriar County), Tehran province
