= Baazi =

Baazi may refer to these Indian films:

- Baazi (1951 film), directed by Guru Dutt and starring Dev Anand
- Baazi (1968 film), directed by Moni Bhattacharjee and starring Dharmendra and Waheeda Rehman
- Baazi (1984 film), directed by Raj N. Sippy and starring Dharmendra
- Baazi (1995 film), directed by Ashutosh Gowarikar and starring Aamir Khan
- Baazi (2021 film), an Indian Bengali film

== See also ==
- Bazi (disambiguation)
