= Torkabad, Baft =

Torkabad ترك اباد
- Village
- Location within Iran
- Coordinates: 29°11′26″N 56°47′02″E
- Country: Iran
- Province: Kerman
- County: Baft
- Bakhsh: Central
- Rural District: Bezenjan

Population (2006)
  - Total: 55
- Time zone: UTC+3:30 (IRST)
  - Summer (DST): UTC+4:30 (IRDT)

Torkabad (Persian: ترك اباد, also Romanized as Torkābād) is a village in Bezenjan Rural District, in the Central District of Baft County, Kerman Province, Iran. At the 2006 census, its population was 55, in 14 families.
