= Qaemabad-e Razzaqzadeh =

Qaemabad-e Razzaqzadeh قايم ابادرزاق زاده
- Village
- Location within Iran
- Coordinates: 31°44′24″N 60°04′29″E
- Country: Iran
- Province: South Khorasan
- County: Nehbandan
- Bakhsh: Shusef
- Rural District: Shusef

Population (2006)
  - Total: 32
- Time zone: UTC+3:30 (IRST)
  - Summer (DST): UTC+4:30 (IRDT)

Qaemabad-e Razzaqzadeh (Persian: قايم ابادرزاق زاده, also Romanized as Qā’emābād-e Razzāqzādeh; also known as Qā’emābād, Ebrāhīmābād, Gha’em Abad, Qāimabad, and Qāyemābād) is a village in Shusef Rural District, Shusef District, Nehbandan County, South Khorasan Province, Iran. At the 2006 census, its population was 32, in 6 families.
