= Qaemabad, Kerman =

Qaemabad قائم اباد
- Village
- Location within Iran
- Coordinates: 30°15′14″N 56°59′48″E
- Country: Iran
- Province: Kerman
- County: Kerman
- Bakhsh: Central
- Rural District: Ekhtiarabad

Population (2006)
  - Total: 2,207
- Time zone: UTC+3:30 (IRST)

Qaemabad (Persian: قائم اباد, also Romanized as Qā’emābād; also known as Deh Lārī, Gha’em Abad, Qā’īmābād, and Shahrak-e Qā’emābād) is a village in Ekhtiarabad Rural District, in the Central District of Kerman County, Kerman Province, Iran. At the 2006 census, its population was 2,207, in 515 families.
