= Pol-e Bala Rud =

Pol-e Bala Rud پل بالارود
- Village
- Location within Iran
- Coordinates: 32°35′18″N 48°17′05″E
- Country: Iran
- Province: Khuzestan
- County: Andimeshk
- Bakhsh: Alvar-e Garmsiri
- Rural District: Hoseyniyeh

Population (2006)
  - Total: 331
- Time zone: UTC+3:30 (IRST)
  - Summer (DST): UTC+4:30 (IRDT)

Pol-e Bala Rud (Persian: پل بالارود, also Romanized as Pol-e Bālā Rūd; also known as Bālārūd and Bālā Rūd) is a village in Hoseyniyeh Rural District, Alvar-e Garmsiri District, Andimeshk County, Khuzestan Province, Iran. At the 2006 census, its population was 331, in 65 families.
