= Rafiabad, Khuzestan =

Rafiabad رفيعي اباد
- Village
- Location within Iran
- Coordinates: 32°13′12″N 49°26′43″E
- Country: Iran
- Province: Khuzestan
- County: Andika
- Bakhsh: Central
- Rural District: Qaleh-ye Khvajeh

Population (2006)
  - Total: 108
- Time zone: UTC+3:30 (IRST)
  - Summer (DST): UTC+4:30 (IRDT)

Rafiabad (Persian: رفيعي اباد, also Romanized as Rafī‘ābād; also known as Rafī‘īābād) is a village in Qaleh-ye Khvajeh Rural District, in the Central District of Andika County, Khuzestan Province, Iran. At the 2006 census, its population was 108, in 23 families.
