= Kalateh-ye Mir =

Kalateh-ye Mir كلاته مير
- Village
- Location within Iran
- Coordinates: 31°43′59″N 60°01′42″E
- Country: Iran
- Province: South Khorasan
- County: Nehbandan
- Bakhsh: Shusef
- Rural District: Shusef

Population (2006)
  - Total: 78
- Time zone: UTC+3:30 (IRST)
  - Summer (DST): UTC+4:30 (IRDT)

Kalateh-ye Mir (Persian: كلاته مير, also Romanized as Kalāteh-ye Mīr; also known as Qā’emābād) is a village in Shusef Rural District, Shusef District, Nehbandan County, South Khorasan Province, Iran. At the 2006 census, its population was 78, in 22 families.
