= Posht-e Rud, Bardsir =

Posht-e Rud پشت رود
- Village
- Location within Iran
- Coordinates: 29°41′24″N 56°34′12″E
- Country: Iran
- Province: Kerman
- County: Bardsir
- Bakhsh: Central
- Rural District: Mashiz

Population (2006)
  - Total: 19
- Time zone: UTC+3:30 (IRST)
  - Summer (DST): UTC+4:30 (IRDT)

Posht-e Rud (Persian: پشت رود, also Romanized as Posht-e Rūd) is a village in Mashiz Rural District, in the Central District of Bardsir County, Kerman Province, Iran. At the 2006 census, its population was 19, in 5 families.
