= Qaemabad, South Khorasan =

Qaemabad قائم اباد
- Village
- Location within Iran
- Coordinates: 32°16′04″N 58°53′15″E
- Country: Iran
- Province: South Khorasan
- County: Khusf
- Bakhsh: Jolgeh-e Mazhan
- Rural District: Qaleh Zari

Population (2006)
  - Total: 11
- Time zone: UTC+3:30 (IRST)
  - Summer (DST): UTC+4:30 (IRDT)

Qaemabad (Persian: قائم اباد, also Romanized as Qā’emābād and Gha’em Abad) is a village in Qaleh Zari Rural District, Jolgeh-e Mazhan District, Khusf County, South Khorasan Province, Iran. At the 2006 census, its population was 11, in 4 families.
