= Chehel Tokhm, Bam =

Chehel Tokhm چهل تخم
- Village
- Location within Iran
- Coordinates: 29°07′34″N 58°19′46″E
- Country: Iran
- Province: Kerman
- County: Bam
- Bakhsh: Central
- Rural District: Kork and Nartich

Population (2006)
  - Total: 542
- Time zone: UTC+3:30 (IRST)
  - Summer (DST): UTC+4:30 (IRDT)

Chehel Tokhm (Persian: چهل تخم; also known as Chehel Tokhm-e Bam, Chil Tūkh, Seyyedābād, and Zeydābād Chehel Tokhm) is a village in Kork and Nartich Rural District, in the Central District of Bam County, Kerman Province, Iran. As of the 2006 census, the population was 542 individuals, making up 143 families.
