= Bazi Rural District =

Rural district in Sistan and Baluchestan province, Iran

Bazi Rural District Persian: دهستان بزی
- Rural District
- Location within Iran
- Coordinates: 31°16′49″N 61°26′21″E
- Country: Iran
- Province: Sistan and Baluchestan
- County: Nimruz
- District: Central
- Capital: Deh Bazi-ye Olya

Population (2016)
  - Total: 4,643
- Time zone: UTC+3:30 (IRST)

Bazi Rural District (Persian: دهستان بزی) is in the Central District of Nimruz County, Sistan and Baluchestan province, Iran. Its capital is the village of Deh Bazi-ye Olya.

== Demographics ==
=== Population ===
At the time of the 2006 National Census, the rural district's population (as a part of the former Posht Ab District of Zabol County) was 5,009 in 1,040 households. There were 4,580 inhabitants in 1,057 households at the following census of 2011. The 2016 census measured the population of the rural district as 4,643 in 1,228 households, by which time the district had been separated from the county in the establishment of Nimruz County. The rural district was transferred to the new Central District. The most populous of its 37 villages was Chark, with 830 people.
