= Qaemabad, Arzuiyeh =

Qaemabad قايم اباد
- Village
- Location within Iran
- Coordinates: 28°25′46″N 56°18′44″E
- Country: Iran
- Province: Kerman
- County: Arzuiyeh
- Bakhsh: Central
- Rural District: Arzuiyeh

Population (2006)
  - Total: 41
- Time zone: UTC+3:30 (IRST)
  - Summer (DST): UTC+4:30 (IRDT)

Qaemabad (Persian: قايم اباد, also Romanized as Qā’emābād) is a village in Arzuiyeh Rural District, in the Central District of Arzuiyeh County, Kerman Province, Iran. At the 2006 census, its population was 41, in 7 families.
