= Kodur, Pulkal =

Kodur
- Village
- Location in Telangana, India Kodur (India)
- Coordinates: 17.708443°N 78.013229°E
- Country: India
- State: Telangana
- District: Medak

Languages
  - Official: Telugu
- Time zone: UTC+5:30 (IST)
- Vehicle registration: TS 23
- Vidhan Sabha constituency: Sangareddy

Kodur is a village in Pulkal Mandal, Sangareddy District, Telangana, India.
