= Central District (Nimruz County) =

District in Sistan and Baluchestan province, Iran

Central District (Nimruz County) Persian: بخش مرکزی شهرستان نیمروز
- District
- Location within Iran
- Coordinates: 31°14′36″N 61°26′24″E
- Country: Iran
- Province: Sistan and Baluchestan
- County: Nimruz
- Capital: Adimi

Population (2016)
  - Total: 26,001
- Time zone: UTC+3:30 (IRST)

The Central District of Nimruz County (Persian: بخش مرکزی شهرستان نیمروز) is in Sistan and Baluchestan province, Iran. Its capital is the city of Adimi.

== History ==
In 2013, Posht Ab District was separated from Zabol County in the establishment of Nimruz County, which was divided into two districts of two rural districts each, with Adimi as its capital and only city.

== Demographics ==
=== Population ===
At the time of the 2016 National Census, the district's population was 26,001 inhabitants in 7,105 households.

=== Administrative divisions ===
Central District (Nimruz County) Population
Administrative Divisions	2016
Adimi RD	17,745
Bazi RD	4,643
Adimi (city)	3,613
Total	26,001
RD = Rural District
