= Adimi =

City in Sistan and Baluchestan province, Iran

Adimi Persian: ادیمی
- City
- Location within Iran
- Coordinates: 31°07′02″N 61°24′30″E
- Country: Iran
- Province: Sistan and Baluchestan
- County: Nimruz
- District: Central

Population (2016)
  - Total: 3,613
- Time zone: UTC+3:30 (IRST)

Adimi (Persian: اديمي) (Note: Also romanized as Adīmī; also known as Hādīmi) is a city in the Central District of Nimruz County, Sistan and Baluchestan province, Iran, serving as capital of both the county and the district. It is also the administrative center for Adimi Rural District.

== Demographics ==
=== Population ===
At the time of the 2006 National Census, the city's population was 2,974 in 630 households, when it was capital of the former Posht Ab District of Zabol County. The following census in 2011 counted 3,328 people in 757 households. The 2016 census measured the population of the city as 3,613 people in 862 households, by which time the district had been separated from the county in the establishment of Nimruz County. The city and the rural district were transferred to the new Central District, with Adimi as the county's capital.
