= Qaemabad Rural District (Nimruz County) =

Rural district in Sistan and Baluchestan province, Iran

Qaemabad Rural District Persian: دهستان قائم‌آباد
- Rural District
- Location within Iran
- Coordinates: 31°01′28″N 61°27′12″E
- Country: Iran
- Province: Sistan and Baluchestan
- County: Nimruz
- District: Saberi
- Capital: Qaemabad

Population (2016)
  - Total: 17,410
- Time zone: UTC+3:30 (IRST)

Qaemabad Rural District (Persian: دهستان قائم‌آباد) is in Saberi District of Nimruz County, Sistan and Baluchestan province, Iran. Its capital is the village of Qaemabad.

== Demographics ==
=== Population ===
At the time of the 2006 National Census, the rural district's population (as a part of the former Posht Ab District of Zabol County) was 13,039 in 2,761 households. There were 15,637 inhabitants in 3,851 households at the following census of 2011. The 2016 census measured the population of the rural district as 17,410 in 4,543 households, by which time the district had been separated from the county in the establishment of Nimruz County. The rural district was transferred to the new Saberi District. The most populous of its 30 villages was Deh Fatah Allah, with 2,429 people.
