= Narmashir =

City in Kerman province, Iran

Narmashir Persian: نرماشير
- City
- Location within Iran
- Coordinates: 28°57′10″N 58°41′39″E
- Country: Iran
- Province: Kerman
- County: Narmashir
- District: Central

Population (2016)
  - Total: 5,222
- Time zone: UTC+3:30 (IRST)

Narmashir (Persian: نرماشير, romanized: Narmāshīr) (Note: Formerly, Rostamabad (رستم آباد), also romanized as Rostamābād) is a city in the Central District of Narmashir County, Kerman province, Iran, serving as capital of both the county and the district.

== History ==
In the middle ages, Narmashir was one of the major cities of Kerman, but it was not at its present location — the ruins at the nearby village of Choghukabad are the most likely candidate for the site of medieval Narmashir. The medieval geographers al-Muqaddasi, Yaqut al-Hamawi, and Hamdallah Mustawfi described medieval Narmashir as a large and prosperous town on the main trade route connecting Kerman with Sistan. Merchants travelling between Oman and Khorasan did business here, and there was also a market for Indian goods. The town was walled, with four gates and a citadel, and there was a congregational mosque built of fired brick. Narmashir was one of the five kuras (districts) of Kerman during this period. Sometime between Mustawfi's account in the 14th century, Narmashir became abandoned; European travellers in the 19th century found no trace of it.

== Demographics ==
=== Population ===
At the time of the 2006 National Census, the city's population was 3,966 in 1,007 households, when it was capital of the former Narmashir District of Bam County The following census in 2011 counted 6,167 people in 1,587 households, by which time the district had been separated from the county in the establishment of Narmashir County. Narmashir was transferred to the new Central District as the county's capital. The 2016 census measured the population of the city as 5,222 people in 1,545 households.
