= Sefidabeh Rural District =

Rural district in Sistan and Baluchestan province, Iran

Sefidabeh Rural District Persian: دهستان سفیدابه
- Rural District
- Location within Iran
- Coordinates: 30°47′32″N 60°41′29″E
- Country: Iran
- Province: Sistan and Baluchestan
- County: Nimruz
- District: Sefidabeh
- Capital: Sefidabeh

Population (2016)
  - Total: 4,914
- Time zone: UTC+3:30 (IRST)

Sefidabeh Rural District (Persian: دهستان سفیدابه) is in Sefidabeh District of Nimruz County, Sistan and Baluchestan province, Iran. Its capital is the village of Sefidabeh.

== Demographics ==
=== Population ===
At the time of the 2006 National Census, the rural district's population (as a part of the former Posht Ab District of Zabol County) was 4,255 in 782 households. There were 4,101 inhabitants in 830 households at the following census of 2011. The 2016 census measured the population of the rural district as 4,914 in 1,023 households, by which time the district had been separated from the county in the establishment of Nimruz County. The rural district was transferred to the new Saberi District. The most populous of its 40 villages was Sefidabeh, with 3,434 people.

After the census, the rural district was separated from the district in the establishment of Sefidabeh District.
