= Saberi District =

District in Sistan and Baluchestan province, Iran

Saberi District Persian: بخش صابری
- District
- Location within Iran
- Coordinates: 31°14′19″N 61°01′57″E
- Country: Iran
- Province: Sistan and Baluchestan
- County: Nimruz
- Capital: Qaemabad

Population (2016)
  - Total: 22,324
- Time zone: UTC+3:30 (IRST)

Saberi District (Persian: بخش صابری) is in Nimruz County, Sistan and Baluchestan province, Iran. Its capital is the village of Qaemabad.

== History ==
In 2013, Posht Ab District was separated from Zabol County in the establishment of Nimruz County, which was divided into two districts of two rural districts each, with Adimi as its capital and only city. After the 2016 National Census, Golkhani Rural District was created in Saberi District, and Sefidabeh Rural District was separated from it in the formation of Sefidabeh District.

== Demographics ==
=== Population ===
At the time of the 2016 census, the district's population was 22,324 inhabitants in 5,566 households.

=== Administrative divisions ===
Saberi District Population
Administrative Divisions	2016
Golkhani RD (Note: Established after the 2016 census)	
Qaemabad RD	17,410
Sefidabeh RD (Note: Became a part of Sefidabeh District after the 2016 census)	4,914
Total	22,324
RD = Rural District
