= Narmashir District =

Former district in Kerman province, Iran

Narmashir District Persian: بخش نرماشیر
- Former District
- Location within Iran
- Coordinates: 29°14′N 58°46′E
- Country: Iran
- Province: Kerman
- County: Bam
- Capital: Narmashir

Population (2006)
  - Total: 37,078
- Time zone: UTC+3:30 (IRST)

Narmashir District (Persian: بخش نرماشیر) is a former administrative division of Bam County, Kerman province, Iran. Its capital was the city of Narmashir. (Note: Formerly the village of Rostamabad) The previous capital of the district was the village of Fahraj, now a city and the capital of Fahraj County.

== History ==
After the 2006 National Census, the district was separated from the county in the establishment of Narmashir County.

== Demographics ==
=== Population ===
At the time of the 2006 census, the district's population was 37,078 in 8,665 households.

=== Administrative divisions ===
Narmashir District Population
Administrative Divisions	2006
Azizabad RD	18,061
Poshtrud RD	15,051
Narmashir (city)	3,966
Total	37,078
RD = Rural District
