= Baravat District =

District in Kerman province, Iran

Baravat District Persian: بخش بروات
- District
- Location within Iran
- Coordinates: 28°59′14″N 58°22′19″E
- Country: Iran
- Province: Kerman
- County: Bam
- Capital: Baravat

Population (2016)
  - Total: 59,612
- Time zone: UTC+3:30 (IRST)

Baravat District (Persian: بخش بروات) is in Bam County, Kerman province, Iran. Its capital is the city of Baravat.

== History ==
After the 2006 National Census, Kork and Nartich Rural District was separated from the Central District, and Rud Ab-e Gharbi Rural District from Rud Ab District, in the formation of Baravat District. After the 2011 census, the city of Baravat joined the new district from the Central District.

== Demographics ==
=== Population ===
At the time of the 2011 census, the district's population was 35,673 people in 11,022 households. The 2016 census measured the population of the district as 59,612 inhabitants in 18,971 households.

=== Administrative divisions ===
Baravat District Population
Administrative Divisions	2011	2016
Kork and Nartich RD	13,756	12,868
Rud Ab-e Gharbi RD	21,917	23,983
Baravat (city)		22,761
Total	35,673	59,612
RD = Rural District
