= Azizabad Rural District =

Rural district in Kerman province, Iran

Azizabad Rural District Persian: دهستان عزيزآباد
- Rural District
- Location within Iran
- Coordinates: 28°54′11″N 58°42′07″E
- Country: Iran
- Province: Kerman
- County: Narmashir
- District: Central
- Capital: Deh-e Vasat

Population (2016)
  - Total: 20,226
- Time zone: UTC+3:30 (IRST)

Azizabad Rural District (Persian: دهستان عزيزآباد) is in the Central District of Narmashir County, Kerman province, Iran. Its capital is the village of Deh-e Vasat.

== Demographics ==
=== Population ===
At the time of the 2006 National Census, the rural district's population (as a part of the former Narmashir District of Bam County) was 18,061 in 4,057 households. There were 20,065 inhabitants in 5,684 households at the following census of 2011, by which time the district had been separated from the county in the establishment of Narmashir County. The rural district was transferred to the new Central District. The 2016 census measured the population of the rural district as 20,226 in 5,900 households. The most populous of its 39 villages was Deh Now-e Azizabad, with 2,261 people.
