= Nimruz County =

County in Sistan and Baluchestan province, Iran

Nimruz County Persian: شهرستان نیمروز
- County
- Location of Nimruz County in Sistan and Baluchestan province (top, green)

- Location of Sistan and Baluchestan province in Iran
- Coordinates: 30°57′N 60°46′E
- Country: Iran
- Province: Sistan and Baluchestan
- Capital: Adimi
- Districts: Central, Saberi, Sefidabeh

Population (2016)
  - Total: 48,471
- Time zone: UTC+3:30 (IRST)

Nimruz County (Persian: شهرستان نیمروز) is in Sistan and Baluchestan province, Iran. Its capital is the city of Adimi.

== History ==
In 2013, Posht Ab District was separated from Zabol County in the establishment of Nimruz County, which was divided into two districts of two rural districts each, with Adimi as its capital and only city.

After the 2016 National Census, Golkhani Rural District was created in Saberi District, and Sefidabeh Rural District was separated from it in the formation of Sefidabeh District, including the new Madeh Kariz Rural District.

== Demographics ==
=== Population ===
At the time of the 2016 census, the county's population was 48,471 in 12,700 households.

=== Administrative divisions ===
Nimruz County's population and administrative structure are shown in the following table.

Nimruz County Population
Administrative Divisions	2016
Central District	26,001
Adimi RD	17,745
Bazi RD	4,643
Adimi (city)	3,613
Saberi District	22,324
Golkhani RD (Note: Established after the 2016 census.)	
Qaemabad RD	17,410
Sefidabeh RD	4,914
Sefidabeh District	
Madeh Kariz RD	
Sefidabeh RD	
Total	48,471
RD = Rural District

== See also ==
Media related to Nimruz County at Wikimedia Commons
