= Kork and Nartich Rural District =

Rural district in Kerman province, Iran

Kork and Nartich Rural District Persian: دهستان کرک و نارتیج
- Rural District
- Location within Iran
- Coordinates: 29°15′08″N 58°25′36″E
- Country: Iran
- Province: Kerman
- County: Bam
- District: Baravat
- Capital: Poshtrud

Population (2016)
  - Total: 12,868
- Time zone: UTC+3:30 (IRST)

Kork and Nartich Rural District (Persian: دهستان کرک و نارتیج) is in Baravat District of Bam County, Kerman province, Iran. Its capital is the village of Poshtrud.

== Demographics ==
=== Population ===
At the time of the 2006 National Census, the rural district's population (as a part of the Central District) was 9,216 in 2,519 households. There were 13,756 inhabitants in 4,226 households at the following census of 2011, by which time the rural district had been separated from the district in the formation of Baravat District. The 2016 census measured the population of the rural district as 12,868 in 3,994 households. The most populous of its 14 villages was Espigan, with 4,476 people.
