= Rud Ab-e Sharqi Rural District =

Rural district in Kerman province, Iran

Rud Ab-e Sharqi Rural District Persian: دهستان روداب شرقی
- Rural District
- Location within Iran
- Coordinates: 28°53′51″N 58°33′47″E
- Country: Iran
- Province: Kerman
- County: Narmashir
- District: Rud Ab
- Capital: Nezamshahr

Population (2016)
  - Total: 6,487
- Time zone: UTC+3:30 (IRST)

Rud Ab-e Sharqi Rural District (Persian: دهستان روداب شرقی) is in Rud Ab District of Narmashir County, Kerman province, Iran. It is administered from the city of Nezamshahr. (Note: Formerly the village of Nezamabad)

== Demographics ==
=== Population ===
At the time of the 2006 National Census, the rural district's population (as a part of Bam County) was 12,059 in 2,987 households. There were 6,914 inhabitants in 1,878 households at the following census of 2011, by which time the district had been separated from the county in the establishment of Narmashir County. The 2016 census measured the population of the rural district as 6,427 in 1,977 households. The most populous of its 17 villages was Jalalabad, with 1,359 people.
