= Poshtrud Rural District =

Rural district in Kerman province, Iran

Poshtrud Rural District Persian: دهستان پشت رود
- Rural District
- Location within Iran
- Coordinates: 29°16′51″N 58°48′53″E
- Country: Iran
- Province: Kerman
- County: Narmashir
- District: Central
- Capital: Qasemabad

Population (2016)
  - Total: 14,642
- Time zone: UTC+3:30 (IRST)

Poshtrud Rural District (Persian: دهستان پشت رود) is in the Central District of Narmashir County, Kerman province, Iran. Its capital is the village of Qasemabad.

== Demographics ==
=== Population ===
At the time of the 2006 National Census, the rural district's population (as a part of the former Narmashir District of Bam County) was 15,051 in 3,601 households. There were 17,918 inhabitants in 4,579 households at the following census of 2011, by which time the district had been separated from the county in the establishment of Narmashir County. The rural district was transferred to the new Central District. The 2016 census measured the population of the rural district as 14,642 in 4,460 households. The most populous of its 94 villages was Qaleh Shahid, with 1,923 people.
