= Posht Ab District =

Former district in Sistan and Baluchestan province, Iran

Posht Ab District Persian: بخش پشت‌آب
- Former District
- Location within Iran
- Coordinates: 30°57′N 60°46′E
- Country: Iran
- Province: Sistan and Baluchestan
- County: Zabol
- Capital: Adimi

Population (2011)
  - Total: 45,466
- Time zone: UTC+3:30 (IRST)

Posht Ab District (Persian: بخش پشت‌آب) is a former administrative division of Zabol County, Sistan and Baluchestan province, Iran. Its capital was the city of Adimi.

== History ==
In 2013, the district was separated from the county in the establishment of Nimruz County.

== Demographics ==
=== Population ===
At the time of the 2006 National Census, the district's population was 40,434 in 8,737 households. The following census in 2011 counted 45,466 people in 10,786 households.

=== Administrative divisions ===
Posht Ab District Population
Administrative Divisions	2006	2011
Adimi RD	15,157	17,820
Bazi RD	5,009	4,580
Qaemabad RD	13,039	15,637
Sefidabeh RD	4,255	4,101
Adimi (city)	2,974	3,328
Total	40,434	45,466
RD = Rural District
