= Rud Ab-e Gharbi Rural District =

Rural district in Kerman province, Iran

Rud Ab-e Gharbi Rural District Persian: دهستان روداب غربی
- Rural District
- Location within Iran
- Coordinates: 28°47′00″N 58°22′39″E
- Country: Iran
- Province: Kerman
- County: Bam
- District: Baravat
- Capital: Karuk

Population (2016)
  - Total: 23,983
- Time zone: UTC+3:30 (IRST)

Rud Ab-e Gharbi Rural District (Persian: دهستان روداب غربی) is in Baravat District of Bam County, Kerman province, Iran. Its capital is the village of Karuk.

== Demographics ==
=== Population ===
At the time of the 2006 National Census, the rural district's population (as a part of Rud Ab District) was 14,554 in 3,450 households. There were 21,917 inhabitants in 6,796 households at the following census of 2011, by which time the rural district had been separated from the district in the formation of Baravat District. The 2016 census measured the population of the rural district as 23,983 in 7,591 households. The most populous of its 88 villages was Dowlatabad-e Ansari, with 2,820 people.
