= Central District (Narmashir County) =

District in Kerman province, Iran

Central District (Narmashir County) Persian: بخش مرکزی شهرستان نرماشیر
- District
- Location within Iran
- Coordinates: 29°13′23″N 58°48′53″E
- Country: Iran
- Province: Kerman
- County: Narmashir
- Capital: Narmashir

Population (2016)
  - Total: 40,090
- Time zone: UTC+3:30 (IRST)

The Central District of Narmashir County (Persian: بخش مرکزی شهرستان نرماشیر) is in Kerman province, Iran. Its capital is the city of Narmashir.

== History ==
After the 2006 National Census, Narmashir and Rud Ab Districts were separated from Bam County in the establishment of Narmashir County, which was divided into two districts of two rural districts each, with Narmashir as its capital.

== Demographics ==
=== Population ===
At the time of the 2011 census, the district's population was 44,150 people in 11,850 households. The 2016 census measured the population of the district as 40,090 inhabitants in 11,905 households.

=== Administrative divisions ===
Central District (Narmashir County) Population
Administrative Divisions	2011	2016
Azizabad RD	20,065	20,226
Posht Rud RD	17,918	14,642
Narmashir (city)	6,167	5,222
Total	44,150	40,090
RD = Rural District
