= Rud Ab District (Narmashir County) =

District in Kerman province, Iran

Rud Ab District Persian: بخش روداب
- District
- Location within Iran
- Coordinates: 28°57′31″N 58°33′38″E
- Country: Iran
- Province: Kerman
- County: Narmashir
- Capital: Nezamshahr

Population (2016)
  - Total: 14,138
- Time zone: UTC+3:30 (IRST)

Rud Ab District (Persian: بخش روداب) is in Narmashir County, Kerman province, Iran. Its capital is the city of Nezamshahr. (Note: Formerly the village of Nezamabad)

== History ==
After the 2006 National Census, Narmashir and Rud Ab Districts were separated from Bam County in the establishment of Narmashir County, which was divided into two districts of two rural districts each, with Narmashir as its capital.

== Demographics ==
=== Population ===
At the time of the 2006 National Census, the district's population (as a part of Bam County) was 13,816 in 3,452 households. The following census in 2011 counted 14,079 people in 3,843 households, by which the district had been separated from the county in the establishment of Narmashir County. The 2016 census measured the population of the district as 14,138 inhabitants in 4,277 households.

=== Administrative divisions ===
Rud Ab District Population (Note: As a part of Bam County at the 2006 census)
Administrative Divisions	2006	2011	2016
Momenabad RD		5,116	5,225
Rud Ab-e Gharbi RD (Note: Transferred to Baravat District of Bam County)	14,554		
Rud Ab-e Sharqi RD	12,059	6,914	6,487
Nezamshahr (city)	1,757	2,049	2,426
Total	28,370	14,079	14,138
RD = Rural District
