= Narmashir County =

County in Kerman province, Iran

Narmashir County Persian: شهرستان نرماشیر
- County
- Location of Narmashir County in Kerman province (center right, purple)

- Location of Kerman province in Iran
- Coordinates: 29°14′N 58°46′E
- County: Iran
- Province: Kerman
- Capital: Narmashir
- Districts: Central, Rud Ab

Population (2016)
  - Total: 54,228
- Time zone: UTC+3:30 (IRST)

Narmashir County (Persian: شهرستان نرماشیر) is in Kerman province, Iran. Its capital is the city of Narmashir.

== History ==
After the 2006 National Census, Narmashir and Rud Ab Districts were separated from Bam County in the establishment of Narmashir County, which was divided into two districts of two rural districts each, with Narmashir as its capital.

== Demographics ==
=== Population ===
At the time of the 2011 census, the county's population was 58,229 people in 15,673 households. The 2016 census measured the population of the county as 54,228 in 16,182 households.

=== Administrative divisions ===
Narmashir County's population history and administrative structure over two consecutive censuses are shown in the following table.

Narmashir County Population
Administrative Divisions	2011	2016
Central District	44,150	40,090
Azizabad RD	20,065	20,226
Poshtrud RD	17,918	14,642
Narmashir (city)	6,167	5,222
Rud Ab District	14,079	14,138
Momenabad RD	5,116	5,225
Rud Ab-e Sharqi RD	6,914	6,487
Nezamshahr (city) (Note: Formerly the village of Nezamabad)	2,049	2,426
Total	58,229	54,228
RD = Rural District

== See also ==
Media related to Narmashir County at Wikimedia Commons
