= Soltanabad =

Soltanabad may refer to:

== Azerbaijan ==
- Soltanabad, Saatly, Azerbaijan

== Iran ==
=== Alborz Province ===
- Soltanabad, Alborz, Iran
- Soltanabad-e Aran, Alborz Province, Iran

=== Ardabil Province ===
- Soltanabad, Ardabil, Iran

=== Chaharmahal and Bakhtiari Province ===
- Soltanabad, Chaharmahal and Bakhtiari, a village in Borujen County

=== East Azerbaijan Province ===
- Soltanabad, Ahar, a village in Ahar County
- Soltanabad, Charuymaq, a village in Charuymaq County
- Soltanabad-e Agh Ziarat, a village in Charuymaq County
- Soltanabad, Sarab, a village in Sarab County

=== Fars Province ===
- Soltanabad, Bavanat, a village in Bavanat County
- Soltanabad, Darab, a village in Darab County
- Soltanabad, Kazerun, a village in Kazerun County
- Soltanabad, Kharameh, a village in Kharameh County
- Soltanabad, Shiraz, a village in Shiraz County

=== Golestan Province ===
- Soltanabad, Golestan, a village in Gorgan County

=== Hamadan Province ===
- Soltanabad, Malayer, a village in Malayer County
- Soltanabad, Hamadan, a village in Razan County

=== Ilam Province ===
- Soltanabad, Ilam, a village in Ilam County

=== Kerman Province ===
- Soltanabad, Anbarabad, a village in Anbarabad County
- Soltanabad, Arzuiyeh, a village in Baft County
- Soltanabad, Fahraj, a village in Fahraj County
- Soltanabad, Zangiabad, a village in Kerman County
- Soltanabad, Qaleh Ganj, a village in Qaleh Ganj County
- Soltanabad, Rigan, a village in Rigan County

=== Kermanshah Province ===
- Soltanabad, Kangavar, a village in Kangavar County
- Soltanabad, Sahneh, a village in Sahneh County

=== Khuzestan Province ===
- Soltanabad, Andika, a village in Andika County
- Soltanabad, Lali, a village in Lali County
- Soltanabad, Ramhormoz, a village in Ramhormoz County
- Soltanabad Rural District (Khuzestan Province), in Ramhormoz County

=== Kohgiluyeh and Boyer-Ahmad Province ===
- Soltanabad, Kohgiluyeh and Boyer-Ahmad, a village in Basht County

=== Kurdistan Province ===
- Soltanabad, Kurdistan, a village in Qorveh County
- Soltanabad, Korani, a village in Bijar County
- Soltanabad, Najafabad, a village in Bijar County
- Soltanabad, Taghamin, a village in Bijar County
- Soltanabad-e Darreh Viran, a village in Bijar County

=== Markazi Province ===
- Soltanabad, former name of Arak, Iran
- Soltanabad, Markazi, a village in Zarandieh County

=== Mazandaran Province ===
- Soltanabad, Mazandaran, a village in Amol County

=== Qazvin Province ===
- Soltanabad, Qazvin, Iran
- Soltanabad, former name of Eqbaliyeh, Iran

=== Razavi Khorasan Province ===
- Soltanabad, Razavi Khorasan, a city in Khoshab County
- Soltanabad, former name of Kashmar, Iran
- Soltanabad, Bardaskan, a village in Bardaskan County
- Soltanabad, Chenaran, a village in Chenaran County
- Soltanabad, Kalat, a village in Kalat County
- Soltanabad, Khvaf, a village in Khvaf County
- Soltanabad, Mahvelat, a village in Mahvelat County
- Soltanabad, Mashhad, a village in Mashhad County
- Soltanabad-e Namak, a village in Mashhad County
- Soltanabad, Nishapur, a village in Nishapur County
- Soltanabad, Torbat-e Heydarieh, a village in Torbat-e Heydarieh County
- Soltanabad Rural District (Razavi Khorasan Province), in Khoshab County

=== South Khorasan Province ===
- Soltanabad, Nehbandan

=== West Azerbaijan Province ===
- Soltanabad, Urmia, a village in Urmia County
- Soltanabad, Anzal, a village in Urmia County

=== Yazd Province ===
- Soltanabad, Yazd, a village in Taft County
- Soltanabad, Pishkuh, a village in Taft County

=== Zanjan Province ===
- Soltanabad, Zanjan, a village in Zanjan County

== See also ==
- Sultanabad (disambiguation)
