= Sultanabad =

Sultanabad may refer to:

== Armenia ==
- Paghakn, Armenia, formerly called Sultanabad

== Bangladesh ==
- Sultanabad Union, a union council in North Matlab, Chandpur district

== India ==
- Sultanabad, Peddapalli district, Telangana, India

== Iran ==
- Arak, Iran, formerly called Soltan-Abad
- Eqbaliyeh, Iran, formerly Sultanabad
- Kashmar, Iran, formerly Soultanabad
- Soltanabad, Alborz, also called Sultanabad
- Soltanabad-e Aran, also called Sultanabad
- Soltanabad, Arzuiyeh, also called Sultanabad
- Soltanabad, Kharameh, also called Sultanabad
- Soltanabad, Markazi, also called Sultanabad
- Soltanabad, Hamadan, also called Sultanabad
- Soltanabad, Kangavar, also called Sultanabad
- Soltanabad, Malayer, also called Sultanabad
- Soltanabad, Qazvin, also called Sultanabad
- Soltanabad, Razavi Khorasan, also called Sultanabad
- Soltanabad, Khvaf, also called Sultanabad
- Soltanabad, Mahvelat, also called Sultanabad
- Soltanabad-e Namak, also called Sultanabad
- Soltaneb, also called Sultanabad

== Pakistan ==
- Sultanabad, Chitral, town in Chitral, Pakistan
- Sultanabad, Gilgit-Baltistan, city in Gilgit-Baltistan
- Sultanabad, Karachi, neighborhood in Karachi, Pakistan

== Tajikistan ==
- Sultonobod or Sultanabad, a village in Rudaki District, Tajikistan.

== Uzbekistan ==
- Sultonobod or Sultanabad, an urban-type settlement in Andijan Region, Uzbekistan.

== See also ==
- Soltanabad (disambiguation)
- Sultanpur (disambiguation)
- Sultanganj, Bihar, a city in Bihar, India
- Sultanganj, Mainpuri, a village in Uttar Pradesh, India
- Sultanganj, Malda, a village in West Bengal, India
