= Sultanpur =

Sultanpur may refer to the following places:

== Bangladesh ==
- Sultanpur, Moulvibazar, a neighbourhood in the Moulvibazar District

== India ==
- Sultanpur district, Uttar Pradesh
  - Sultanpur, Uttar Pradesh, a city
  - Sultanpur (Assembly constituency), an Uttar Pradesh Legislative Assembly constituency
  - Sultanpur (Lok Sabha constituency)
  - Kanwarpur-Sultanpur, a village in Sultanpur, Uttar Pradesh, India
- Sultanpur (rural), a village in Kapurthala district, Punjab
- Sultanpur, Delhi, a town
  - Sultanpur metro station, a Delhi Metro station
- Sultanpur, Ghazipur, Uttar Pradesh, a village
- Sultanpur, Karimnagar, a gram panchayat in Karimnagar district of state of Telangana, India
- Sultanpur, Karnataka, a village
- Sultanpur, Madhya Pradesh, a town
- Sultanpur, Parbhani, Maharashtra, a village
- Sultanpur, Phillaur, Punjab, a village
- Sultanpur, Uttarakhand, a town
- The name of the city of Warangal from c. 1323
- Sultanpur Aima, Uttar Pradesh, a village
- Sultanpur Gram Panchayat, a gram panchayat in Hajipur, Vaishali District, Bihar
- Sultanpur Jala, Uttar Pradesh, a village
- Sultanpur Khera, Uttar Pradesh, a village
- Sultanpur Lodhi, Punjab, a city
- Sultanpur National Park, Haryana
- Sultanpur-Punahana, Haryana

== Pakistan ==
- Sultanpur, Jhelum, union council of Jhelum District, Punjab Province
- Sultanpur, Havelian, Abbottabad, a city next to Havelian, Abbottabad, KPK Province

== See also ==
- Sultanabad (disambiguation)
