= Nowzad =

Nowzad or Nawzad or Nauzad or NozadorNouzad (Persian/Pashto/Kurdish: نوزاد) is a Persian, Pashto and Kurdish word meaning "newborn." It is also a city name and personal name.

Notable places, organizations and surnames include:

== Organisations ==
- Nowzad Dogs, an Anglo-Afghani pet rescue charity

== Places ==
=== Afghanistan ===
- Nawzad, Afghanistan, a small town in Helmand Province
- Nawzad District, a district in northern Helmand

=== Iran ===
- Nowzad, Kerman
- Nowzad, Razavi Khorasan
- Nowzad, Kashmar, Razavi Khorasan Province
- Nowzad, Darmian, South Khorasan Province
- Nowzad, Sarbisheh, South Khorasan Province
- Nawzad, Divan

== Names ==
- Nawzad Hadi Mawlood (born 1963): Iraqi Kurdish politician
- Haider Nawzad (born 1983): an Iraqi rower
- Pejman Nozad : an Iranian-American venture capitalist
