= Kalateh-ye Payeh =

Village in Razavi Khorasan province, Iran

Kalateh-ye Payeh Persian: كلاته پايه
- Village
- Location within Iran
- Coordinates: 36°27′28″N 59°01′13″E
- Country: Iran
- Province: Razavi Khorasan
- County: Golbahar
- District: Golmakan
- Rural District: Cheshmeh Sabz

Population (2016)
  - Total: 790
- Time zone: UTC+3:30 (IRST)

Kalateh-ye Payeh (Persian: كلاته پايه) (Note: Also romanized as Kalāteh-ye Pāyeh; also known as Pāyeh) is a village in Cheshmeh Sabz Rural District of Golmakan District in Golbahar County, Razavi Khorasan province, Iran.

== Demographics ==
=== Population ===
At the time of the 2006 National Census, the village's population was 1,234 in 311 households, when it was in Golmakan Rural District of the former Golbahar District in Chenaran County. The following census in 2011 counted 752 people in 221 households. The 2016 census measured the population of the village as 790 people in 227 households.

In 2020, the district was separated from the county in the establishment of Golbahar County. The rural district was transferred to the new Golmakan District, and Kalateh-ye Payeh was transferred to Cheshmeh Sabz Rural District created in the same district.
