= Chenar, Golbahar =

Village in Razavi Khorasan province, Iran

Chenar Persian: چنار
- Village
- Location within Iran
- Coordinates: 36°28′19″N 59°07′06″E
- Country: Iran
- Province: Razavi Khorasan
- County: Golbahar
- District: Golmakan
- Rural District: Cheshmeh Sabz

Population (2016)
  - Total: 350
- Time zone: UTC+3:30 (IRST)

Chenar (Persian: چنار) (Note: Also romanized as Chenār) is a village in, and the capital of, Cheshmeh Sabz Rural District in Golmakan District of Golbahar County, Razavi Khorasan province, Iran.

== Demographics ==
=== Population ===
At the time of the 2006 National Census, the village's population was 161 in 52 households, when it was in Golmakan Rural District of the former Golbahar District in Chenaran County. The following census in 2011 counted 205 people in 70 households. The 2016 census measured the population of the village as 350 people in 111 households.

In 2020, the district was separated from the county in the establishment of Golbahar County. The rural district was transferred to the new Golmakan District, and Chenar was transferred to Cheshmeh Sabz Rural District created in the same district.
