= Kahu, Golbahar =

Village in Razavi Khorasan province, Iran

Kahu Persian: كاهو
- Village
- Location within Iran
- Coordinates: 36°26′38″N 59°12′21″E
- Country: Iran
- Province: Razavi Khorasan
- County: Golbahar
- District: Golmakan
- Rural District: Cheshmeh Sabz

Population (2016)
  - Total: 555
- Time zone: UTC+3:30 (IRST)

Kahu (Persian: كاهو) (Note: Also romanized as Kāhū) is a village in Cheshmeh Sabz Rural District of Golmakan District in Golbahar County, Razavi Khorasan province, Iran.

== Demographics ==
=== Population ===
At the time of the 2006 National Census, the village's population was 768 in 233 households, when it was in Golmakan Rural District of the former Golbahar District in Chenaran County. The following census in 2011 counted 569 people in 187 households. The 2016 census measured the population of the village as 555 people in 188 households.

In 2020, the district was separated from the county in the establishment of Golbahar County. The rural district was transferred to the new Golmakan District, and Kahu was transferred to Cheshmeh Sabz Rural District created in the same district.
