= Hoseynabad, Golbahar =

Village in Razavi Khorasan province, Iran

Hoseynabad Persian: حسين اباد
- Village
- Location within Iran
- Country: Iran
- Province: Razavi Khorasan
- County: Golbahar
- District: Golmakan
- Rural District: Cheshmeh Sabz

Population (2016)
  - Total: 21
- Time zone: UTC+3:30 (IRST)

Hoseynabad (Persian: حسين اباد) (Note: Also romanized as Ḩoseynābād; also known as Ḩoseynābād-e Āli-e Hāshemī) is a village in Cheshmeh Sabz Rural District of Golmakan District in Golbahar County, Razavi Khorasan province, Iran.

== Demographics ==
=== Population ===
At the time of the 2006 National Census, the village's population was 78 in 18 households, when it was in Golmakan Rural District of the former Golbahar District in Chenaran County. The following census in 2011 counted 54 people in 17 households. The 2016 census measured the population of the village as 21 people in six households.

In 2020, the district was separated from the county in the establishment of Golbahar County. The rural district was transferred to the new Golmakan District, and Hoseynabad was transferred to Cheshmeh Sabz Rural District created in the same district.
