= Abqad =

Abqad (Persian: ابقد) may refer to:

- Abqad, Chenaran
- Abqad, Mashhad
