= Dowlatabad, Golbahar =

Village in Razavi Khorasan province, Iran

Dowlatabad Persian: دولت اباد
- Village
- Location within Iran
- Coordinates: 36°26′12″N 59°09′59″E
- Country: Iran
- Province: Razavi Khorasan
- County: Golbahar
- District: Golmakan
- Rural District: Cheshmeh Sabz

Population (2016)
  - Total: 919
- Time zone: UTC+3:30 (IRST)

Dowlatabad (Persian: دولت اباد) (Note: Also romanized as Dowlatābād; also known as Khorram Darreh) is a village in Cheshmeh Sabz Rural District of Golmakan District in Golbahar County, Razavi Khorasan province, Iran.

== Demographics ==
=== Population ===
At the time of the 2006 National Census, the village's population was 805 in 194 households, when it was in Golmakan Rural District of the former Golbahar District in Chenaran County. The following census in 2011 counted 625 people in 206 households. The 2016 census measured the population of the village as 919 people in 285 households.

In 2020, the district was separated from the county in the establishment of Golbahar County. The rural district was transferred to the new Golmakan District, and Dowlatabad was transferred to Cheshmeh Sabz Rural District created in the same district.
