= Kalateh-ye Soltanabad =

Kalateh-ye Soltanabad (Persian: كلاته سلطان اباد) may refer to:

- Salmanabad, Razavi Khorasan
- Soltanabad, Mashhad
