= Hasan Aqeh =

Village in Razavi Khorasan province, Iran

Hasan Aqeh Persian: حسن اقه
- Village
- Location within Iran
- Coordinates: 36°29′21″N 59°04′54″E
- Country: Iran
- Province: Razavi Khorasan
- County: Golbahar
- District: Golmakan
- Rural District: Cheshmeh Sabz

Population (2016)
  - Total: Below reporting threshold
- Time zone: UTC+3:30 (IRST)

Hasan Aqeh (Persian: حسن اقه) (Note: Also romanized as Ḩasan Āqeh and Ḩasanāqeh; also known as Ḩasan Neh) is a village in Cheshmeh Sabz Rural District of Golmakan District in Golbahar County, Razavi Khorasan province, Iran.

== Demographics ==
=== Population ===
At the time of the 2006 National Census, the village's population was 39 in 22 households, when it was in Golmakan Rural District of the former Golbahar District in Chenaran County. The following census in 2011 counted 18 people in 11 households. The 2016 census measured the population of the village as below the reporting threshold.

In 2020, the district was separated from the county in the establishment of Golbahar County. The rural district was transferred to the new Golmakan District, and Hasan Aqeh was transferred to Cheshmeh Sabz Rural District created in the same district.
