= Eyshabad, Golbahar =

Village in Razavi Khorasan province, Iran

Eyshabad Persian: عيش اباد
- Village
- Location within Iran
- Coordinates: 36°29′13″N 59°10′26″E
- Country: Iran
- Province: Razavi Khorasan
- County: Golbahar
- District: Golmakan
- Rural District: Golmakan

Population (2016)
  - Total: Below reporting threshold
- Time zone: UTC+3:30 (IRST)

Eyshabad (Persian: عيش اباد) (Note: Also romanized as ‘Eyshābād) is a village in Golmakan Rural District of Golmakan District in Golbahar County, Razavi Khorasan province, Iran.

== Demographics ==
=== Population ===
At the time of the 2006 National Census, the village's population was 290 in 76 households, when it was in the former Golbahar District of Chenaran County. The following censuses in 2011 and 2016 counted a population below the reporting threshold.

In 2020, the district was separated from the county in the establishment of Golbahar County, and the rural district was transferred to the new Golmakan District.
