= Hashemabad, Golbahar =

Village in Razavi Khorasan province, Iran

Hashemabad Persian: هاشم اباد
- Village
- Location within Iran
- Coordinates: 36°28′05″N 59°14′29″E
- Country: Iran
- Province: Razavi Khorasan
- County: Golbahar
- District: Golmakan
- Rural District: Golmakan

Population (2016)
  - Total: 312
- Time zone: UTC+3:30 (IRST)

Hashemabad (Persian: هاشم اباد) (Note: Also romanized as Hāshemābād; also known as Qal‘eh Now-e Kāhū) is a village in Golmakan Rural District of Golmakan District in Golbahar County, Razavi Khorasan province, Iran.

== Demographics ==
=== Population ===
At the time of the 2006 National Census, the village's population was 302 in 77 households, when it was in the former Golbahar District of Chenaran County. The following census in 2011 counted 216 people in 58 households. The 2016 census measured the population of the village as 312 people in 93 households.

In 2020, the district was separated from the county in the establishment of Golbahar County, and the rural district was transferred to the new Golmakan District.
