= Ahmadabad, Golbahar =

Village in Razavi Khorasan province, Iran

Ahmadabad Persian: احمداباد
- Village
- Location within Iran
- Coordinates: 36°29′02″N 59°12′40″E
- Country: Iran
- Province: Razavi Khorasan
- County: Golbahar
- District: Golmakan
- Rural District: Golmakan

Population (2016)
  - Total: 522
- Time zone: UTC+3:30 (IRST)

Ahmadabad (Persian: احمداباد) (Note: Also romanized as Aḩmadābād) is a village in, and the capital of, Golmakan Rural District in Golmakan District of Golbahar County, Razavi Khorasan province, Iran. The previous capital of the rural district was the village of Golmakan, now a city.

== Demographics ==
=== Population ===
At the time of the 2006 National Census, the village's population was 505 in 130 households, when it was in the former Golbahar District of Chenaran County. The following census in 2011 counted 573 people in 161 households. The 2016 census measured the population of the village as 522 people in 164 households.

In 2020, the district was separated from the county in the establishment of Golbahar County, and the rural district was transferred to the new Golmakan District.
