= Kushkan =

Kushkan (Persian: كوشكان or كوشكن) may refer to:

- Kushkan, Razavi Khorasan (كوشكان - Kūshkān)
- Kushkan, Zanjan (كوشكن - Kūshkan)
