= Behabad, Golbahar =

Village in Razavi Khorasan province, Iran

Behabad Persian: به اباد
- Village
- Location within Iran
- Coordinates: 36°33′09″N 59°15′37″E
- Country: Iran
- Province: Razavi Khorasan
- County: Golbahar
- District: Golmakan
- Rural District: Golmakan

Population (2016)
  - Total: 876
- Time zone: UTC+3:30 (IRST)

Behabad (Persian: به اباد) (Note: Also romanized as Behābād) is a village in Golmakan Rural District of Golmakan District in Golbahar County, Razavi Khorasan province, Iran.

== Demographics ==
=== Population ===
At the time of the 2006 National Census, the village's population was 649 in 155 households, when it was in the former Golbahar District of Chenaran County. The following census in 2011 counted 716 people in 200 households. The 2016 census measured the population of the village as 876 people in 254 households.

In 2020, the district was separated from the county in the establishment of Golbahar County, and the rural district was transferred to the new Golmakan District.
