= Farizi, Golbahar =

Village in Razavi Khorasan province, Iran

Farizi Persian: فريزي
- Village
- Location within Iran
- Coordinates: 36°29′17″N 58°58′32″E
- Country: Iran
- Province: Razavi Khorasan
- County: Golbahar
- District: Golmakan
- Rural District: Cheshmeh Sabz

Population (2016)
  - Total: 388
- Time zone: UTC+3:30 (IRST)

Farizi (Persian: فريزي) (Note: Also romanized as Farīzī and Ferīzī; also known as Farezi and Ferezī) is a village in Cheshmeh Sabz Rural District of Golmakan District in Golbahar County, Razavi Khorasan province, Iran.

== Demographics ==
=== Population ===
At the time of the 2006 National Census, the village's population was 799 in 253 households, when it was in Golmakan Rural District of the former Golbahar District in Chenaran County. The following census in 2011 counted 741 people in 272 households. The 2016 census measured the population of the village as 388 people in 149 households.

In 2020, the district was separated from the county in the establishment of Golbahar County. The rural district was transferred to the new Golmakan District, and Farizi was transferred to Cheshmeh Sabz Rural District created in the same district.
