= Khij, Razavi Khorasan =

Village in Razavi Khorasan province, Iran

Khij Persian: خيج
- Village
- Location within Iran
- Coordinates: 36°33′20″N 59°06′24″E
- Country: Iran
- Province: Razavi Khorasan
- County: Golbahar
- District: Golmakan
- Rural District: Golmakan

Population (2016)
  - Total: 524
- Time zone: UTC+3:30 (IRST)

Khij (Persian: خيج) (Note: Also romanized as Khīj; also known as Khej) is a village in Golmakan Rural District of Golmakan District in Golbahar County, Razavi Khorasan province, Iran.

== Demographics ==
=== Population ===
At the time of the 2006 National Census, the village's population was 457 in 111 households, when it was in the former Golbahar District of Chenaran County. The following census in 2011 counted 535 people in 151 households. The 2016 census measured the population of the village as 524 people in 147 households.

In 2020, the district was separated from the county in the establishment of Golbahar County, and the rural district was transferred to the new Golmakan District.
