= Deh Now, Golbahar =

Village in Razavi Khorasan province, Iran

Deh Now Persian: ده نو
- Village
- Location within Iran
- Country: Iran
- Province: Razavi Khorasan
- County: Golbahar
- District: Golmakan
- Rural District: Golmakan

Population (2016)
  - Total: 60
- Time zone: UTC+3:30 (IRST)

Deh Now (Persian: ده نو) is a village in Golmakan Rural District of Golmakan District in Golbahar County, Razavi Khorasan province, Iran.

== Demographics ==
=== Population ===
At the time of the 2006 National Census, the village's population was 37 in 12 households, when it was in the former Golbahar District of Chenaran County. The following census in 2011 counted 41 people in 15 households. The 2016 census measured the population of the village as 60 people in 17 households.

In 2020, the district was separated from the county in the establishment of Golbahar County, and the rural district was transferred to the new Golmakan District.
