= Kurdistan =

Region of West Asia with a historical Kurdish presence

Kurdistan کوردستان (Kurdish)
- Kurdish-inhabited areas (according to the CIA, 1992)
- Status: Stateless nation
- Largest city: Amed (Diyarbakır)
- Main languages: Kurdish; Arabic; Persian; Turkish; Zaza–Gorani
- Ethnic groups: Kurds, Turks, Arabs, Persians, Assyrians, Turkomans
- Demonym: Kurd

Integrated parts of Iran, Turkey and Syria with varying degrees of autonomy in Iraq

Area
  - Total: 392,000 km^{2} (151,000 sq mi)

Population
  - Estimate: 25–30 million
- Time zone: TRT, AST, IT
- Date format: day-month-year

Kurdistan (Kurdish: کوردستان, lit. 'land of the Kurds'; [ˌkʊɾdɪˈstɑːn]), or Greater Kurdistan, is a roughly defined geo-cultural region and stateless nation in West Asia wherein the Kurds form a prominent majority population and the Kurdish culture, languages, and national identity have historically been based. Geographically, Kurdistan roughly encompasses the northwestern Zagros and the eastern Taurus mountain ranges.

Kurdistan generally comprised the following four regions: southeastern Turkey (Northern Kurdistan), northern Iraq (Southern Kurdistan), northwestern Iran (Eastern Kurdistan), and northern Syria (Western Kurdistan). Some definitions also include parts of southern Transcaucasia. Certain Kurdish nationalist organizations seek to create an independent nation state consisting of some or all of these areas with a Kurdish majority, while others campaign for greater autonomy within the existing national boundaries. The delineation of the region remains disputed and varied, with some maps greatly exaggerating its boundaries.

Historically, the word "Kurdistan" is first attested in 11th century Seljuk chronicles. Many disparate Kurdish dynasties, emirates, principalities, and chiefdoms were established from the 8th to 19th centuries. Administratively, the 20th century saw the establishment of the short-lived areas of the Kurdish state (1918–1919), Kingdom of Kurdistan (1921–1924), Kurdistansky Uyezd i.e. "Red Kurdistan" (1923–1929), Republic of Ararat (1927–1930), and Republic of Mahabad (1946).

In Iraq, following the Aylūl Revolt, the government entered into an agreement with the rebellious Kurds, granting Kurds local self-rule. Soon after, however, the agreement collapsed. Later, during the Iraqi no-fly zones conflict, which followed the Gulf War, the Iraqi military withdrew from parts of northern Iraq, allowing the Kurds to fill the vacuum and regain lost control in those areas. After the invasion of Iraq, and since the creation of the new Iraqi federal state, the new constitution issued in 2005 recognises Kurdistan Region as a federal region; even though the constitution does not include the term "autonomy", it emphasises decentralisation and devolution, allowing regions and governorates to administer local affairs. In practice, however, only Kurdistan Region has exercised this authority granted by the constitution. In September 2017, Iraqi Kurds held a one-sided independence referendum, which eventually failed and was abandoned. The subsequent effort by the Iraqi government to punish Kurdistan Region has resulted in the latter losing authorities it had previously possessed, and the future of Kurdish autonomy in Iraq has been called into question. Iraqi Kurdish officials have also complained of efforts by the Iraqi government to return to the pre-2003 centralized government and dismantle Kurdistan Region altogether.

There is also a Kurdistan province in Iran, which is not self-ruled. Kurds fighting in the Syrian civil war, under the banner of the Syrian Democratic forces, established the Democratic Autonomous Administration of North and East Syria (commonly called Rojava), a self-governing administration which sought to retain its autonomy in a proposed federalized Syria.

== Etymology and delineation ==
Kurdistan means "Land of the Kurds" and was first attested in 11th-century Seljuk chronicles. The exact origins of the name Kurd are unclear. The suffix -stan (Persian: ـستان, translit. stân) is Persian for land.

"Kurdistan" was also formerly spelled Curdistan. One of the ancient names of this region was Corduene. The 19th-century Kurdistan Eyalet was the first time that the Ottoman Empire used the term 'Kurdistan' to refer to an administrative unit rather than a geographical region.

Albeit admitting a thorough delineation is difficult, the Encyclopaedia of Islam delineated Kurdistan as following:

In Turkey, the Kurds inhabit the whole of the eastern region of the country. According to Trotter (1878), the limit of their extent to the north was the line Divriği—Erzurum—Kars... The Kurds also occupy the western slopes of Ararat, the districts of Kağızman and Tuzluca. On the west they extend in a wide belt beyond the course of the Euphrates, and, in the region of Sivas, in the districts of Kangal and Divriği. Equally, the whole region includes areas to the east and south-east of these limits... Turkish Kurdistan numbers at least 17 of them almost totally: in the north-east, the provinces of Erzincan, Erzurum and Kars; in the centre, going from west to east and from north to south, the provinces of Malatya, Tunceli, Elazığ, Bingöl, Muş, Karaköse (Ağrı), then Adıyaman, Diyarbakır, Siirt, Bitlis and Van; Finally, the southern provinces of Şanlıurfa, Mardin and Çölamerik (Hakkâri)...

[Kurds] inhabit the north-west of Iran. Firstly in the provinces of West Azerbaijan, to the east of Lake Rida'iyya..., the districts of Maku, Kotur, Shahpur, and to the south of the lake, Mahabad (ex-Sabla); in the province of Ardalan, called the province of Kurdistan, whose capital is Senna or Sanandaj, Hawraman; in the province of Kermanshah, Qasr-e Shirin...

In Iraq, the Kurds occupy the north and northeast of the country in the liwaʾs or provinces of Duhok... Left outside their administration are Sinjar and Shekhan, peopled by the Yazidis; the liwaʾs of Kirkuk, Arbil and Sulaymaniyah (entirely Kurdish) and, in the... nahiyas of Khanaqin and Mandali, where they are neighbours of the Kurds of Iran to the west of the Zagros.

In Syria, they constitute three distinct belts, in the north of the country and to the south of the highway which forms a frontier and where they are in direct contact with their compatriots in Turkey... [I]n the Kurd Dagh;..., to the east of the Euphrates where the river enters Syria near Jarablus; and finally, a belt of 250 km. in length by 30 km. in depth in the Jazira.

Many of the maps delineating Kurdistan are greatly exaggerated, also incorporating non-Kurdish regions, which has made the subject very controversial.

== History ==
=== Ancient history ===
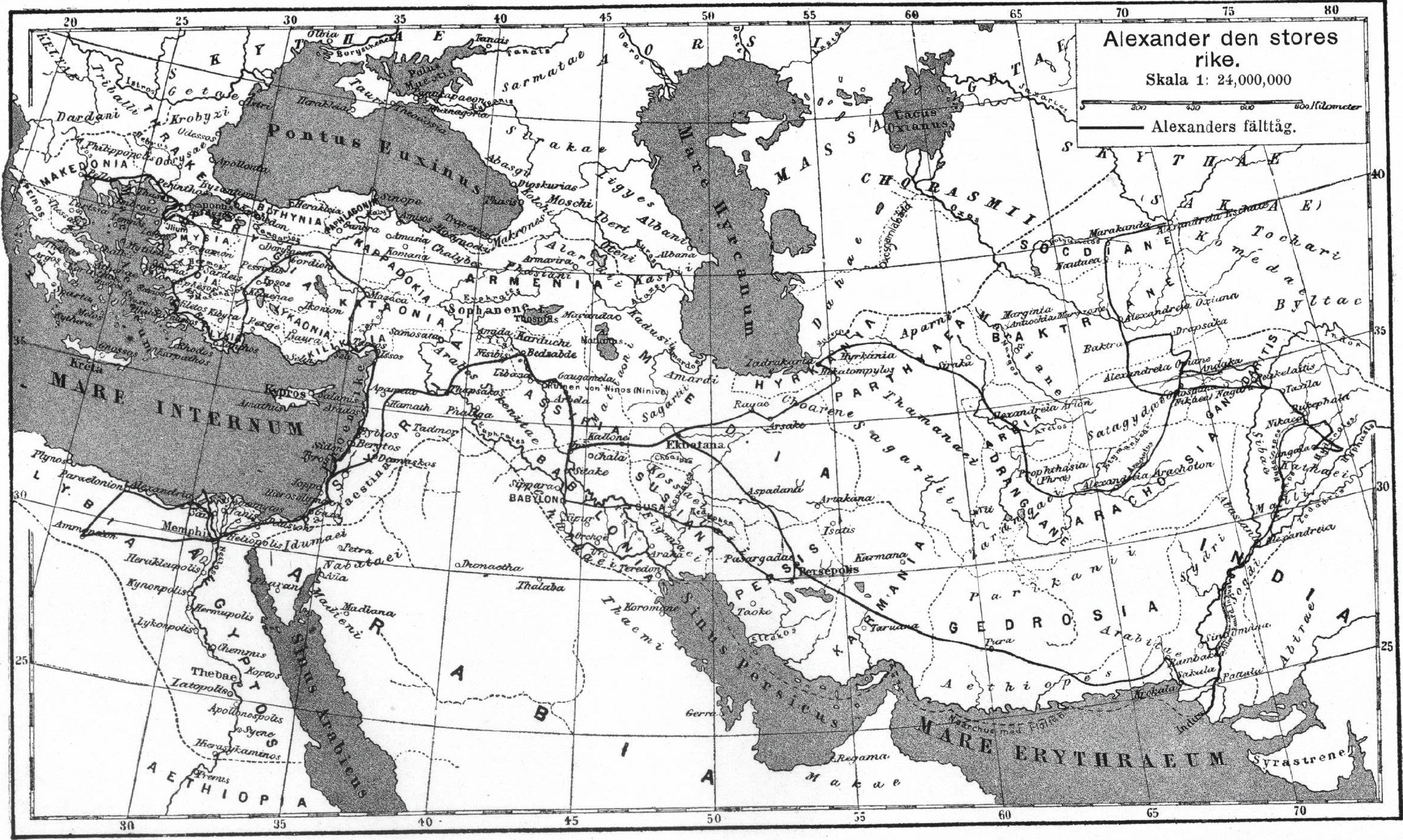
Ancient Kurdistan as Kard-uchi, during Alexander the Great's Empire, 4th century BCE

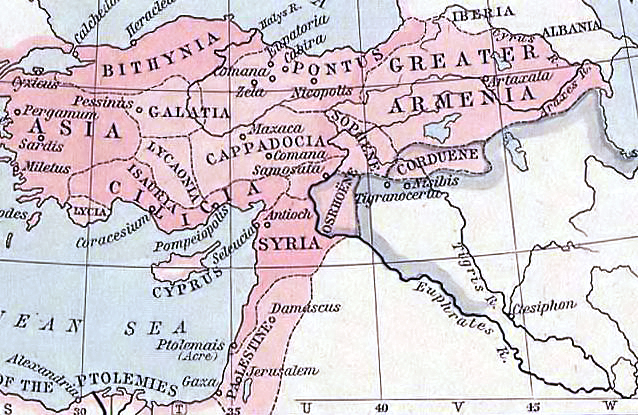
19th-century map showing the location of the Kingdom of Corduene in 60 BCE

Various groups, among them the Guti, Hurrians, Mannai (Mannaeans), and Armenians, lived in this region in antiquity. The original Mannaean homeland was situated east and south of the Lake Urmia, roughly centered around modern-day Mahabad. The region came under Persian rule during the reign of Cyrus the Great and Darius I.

The Kingdom of Corduene, which emerged from the declining Seleucid Empire, was located to the south and south-east of Lake Van between Persia and Mesopotamia and ruled northern Mesopotamia and southeastern Anatolia from 189 BC to AD 384 as vassals of the vying Parthian and Roman empires. Corduene became a vassal state of the Roman Republic in 66 BC and remained allied with the Romans until AD 384. After 66 BC, it passed another 5 times between Rome and Persia. Corduene was situated to the east of Tigranocerta, that is, to the east and south of present-day Diyarbakır in south-eastern Turkey.

Some historians have correlated a connection between Corduene with the modern names of Kurds and Kurdistan; T. A. Sinclair and other scholars have dismissed this identification as false, while a common association is asserted in the Columbia Encyclopedia.

Some of the ancient districts of Kurdistan and their corresponding modern names:

1. Corduene or Gordyene (Siirt, Bitlis and Şırnak)
2. Sophene (Diyarbakır)
3. Zabdicene or Bezabde (Gozarto d'Qardu or Jazirat Ibn or Cizre)
4. Basenia (Bayazid)
5. Moxoene (Muş)
6. Nephercerta (Miyafarkin)
7. Artemita (Van)

One of the earliest records of the phrase land of the Kurds is found in an Assyrian Christian document of late antiquity, describing the stories of Assyrian saints of the Middle East, such as Abdisho. When the Sasanian Marzban asked Mar Abdisho about his place of origin, he replied that according to his parents, they were originally from Hazza, a village in Assyria. However, they were later driven out of Hazza by pagans, and settled in Tamanon, which according to Abdisho was in the land of the Kurds. Tamanon lies just north of the modern Iraq-Turkey border, while Hazza is 12 km southwest of modern Erbil. In another passage in the same document, the region of the Khabur River is also identified as land of the Kurds. According to Al-Muqaddasi and Yaqut al-Hamawi, Tamanon was located on the south-western or southern slopes of Mount Judi and south of Cizre. Other geographical references to the Kurds in Syriac sources appear in Zuqnin chronicle, writings of Michael the Syrian and Bar Hebraeus. They mention the mountains of Qardu, city of Qardu and country of Qardawaye.

=== Post-classical history ===
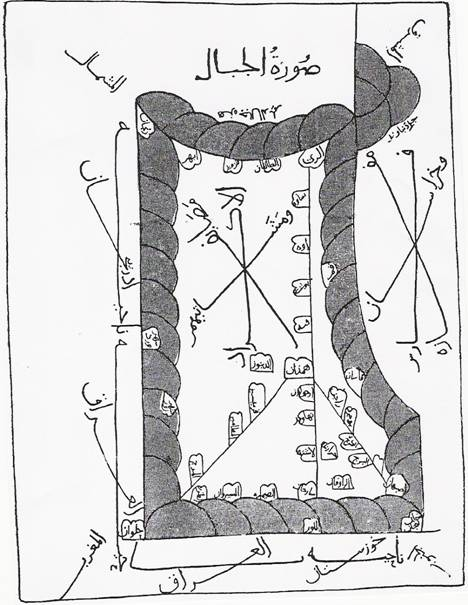
Map of Jibal (mountains of northeastern Mesopotamia), highlighting "Summer and winter resorts of the Kurds", the Kurdish lands. Redrawn from Ibn Hawqal, 977 CE.

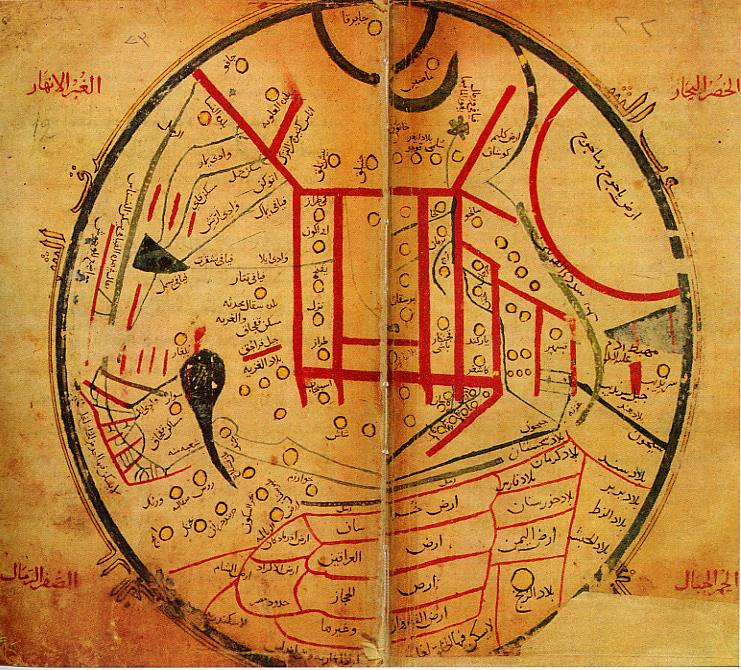
The map from Mahmud al-Kashgari's Dīwān Lughāt al-Turk (1072–74), included Kurdistan.

In the tenth and eleventh centuries, several Kurdish principalities emerged in the region: in the north the Shaddadids (951–1174) (in east Transcaucasia between the Kur and Araxes rivers) and the Rawadids (955–1221) (centered on Tabriz and which controlled all of Azerbaijan), in the east the Hasanwayhids (959–1015) (in Zagros between Shahrizor and Khuzistan) and the Annazids (990–1116) (centered in Hulwan) and in the west the Marwanids (990–1096) to the south of Diyarbakır and north of Jazira.

Kurdistan in the Middle Ages was a collection of semi-independent and independent states called emirates. It was nominally under indirect political or religious influence of Khalifs or Shahs. A comprehensive history of these states and their relationship with their neighbors is given in the text of Sharafnama, written by Prince Sharaf al-Din Bitlisi in 1597. The emirates included Baban, Soran, Badinan and Garmiyan in the south; Bakran, Bohtan (or Botan) and Badlis in the north, and Mukriyan and Ardalan in the east.

The earliest medieval attestation of the toponym Kurdistan is found in a 12th-century Armenian historical text by Matteos Urhayeci. He described a battle near Amid and Siverek in 1062 as to have taken place in Kurdistan. The second record occurs in the prayer from the colophon of an Armenian manuscript of the Gospels, written in 1200.

Kurdistan was also mentioned in 1153, referring to Kermanshah and its surroundings. A later use of the term Kurdistan is found in Empire of Trebizond documents in 1336 and in Nuzhat al-Qulub, written by Hamdallah Mustawfi in 1340. Mustawfi had delineated the geographical boundaries of Kurdistan, adding that its center was Bahar and that it also included the urban centers of Aleshtar, Chamchamal, Dinavar, Hulwan, Harsin, Kangavar, Kerend, Qorveh, Soltanabad, and Shahrizor, while explicitly separating it from the region of Luristan to the south. It bordered Persian Iraq, Arab Iraq, Khuzestan, Azerbaijan, and Diyarbekir.

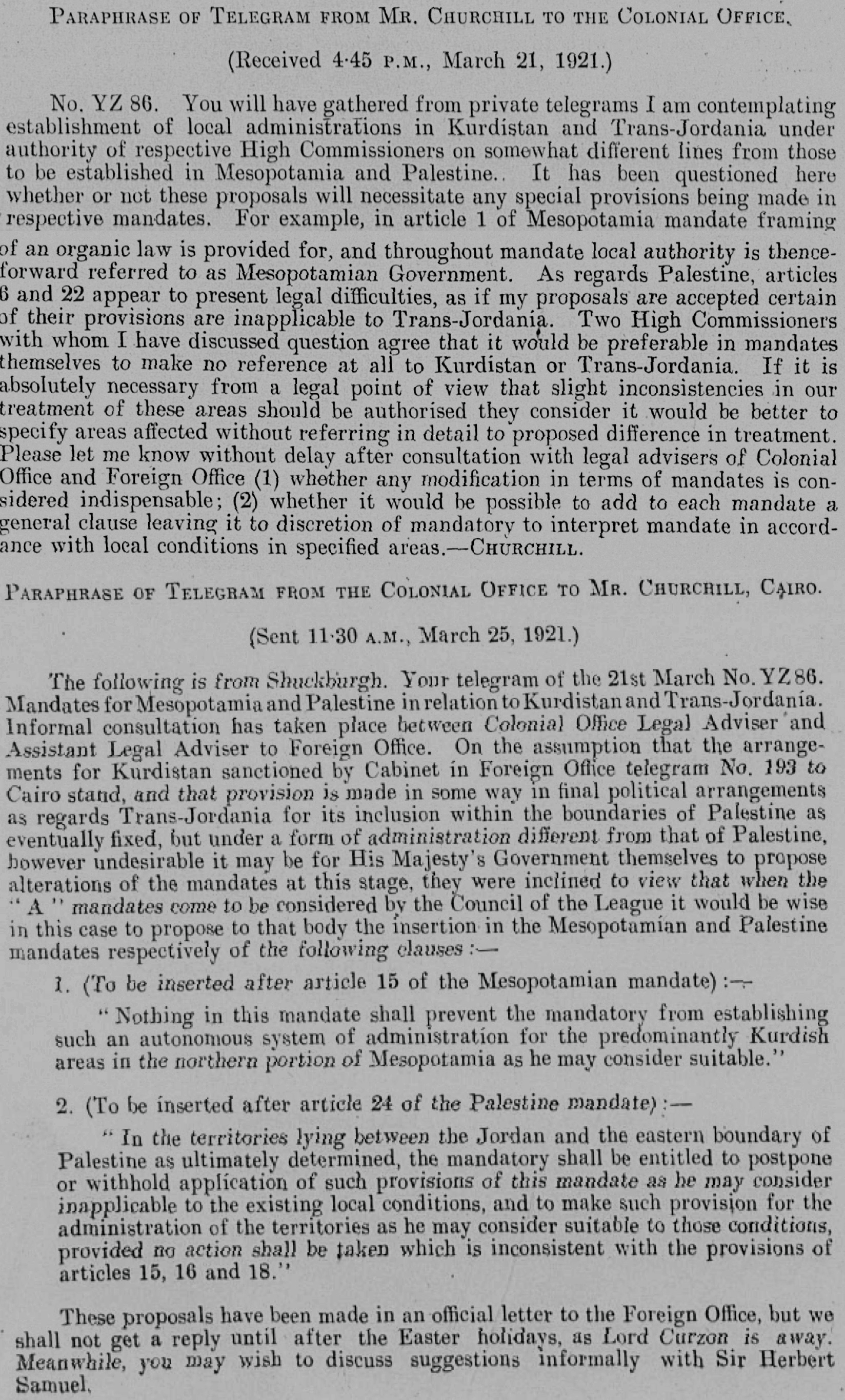
British Government 1921 proposal from the Colonial Secretary, Winston Churchill, for an autonomous region of Kurdistan.

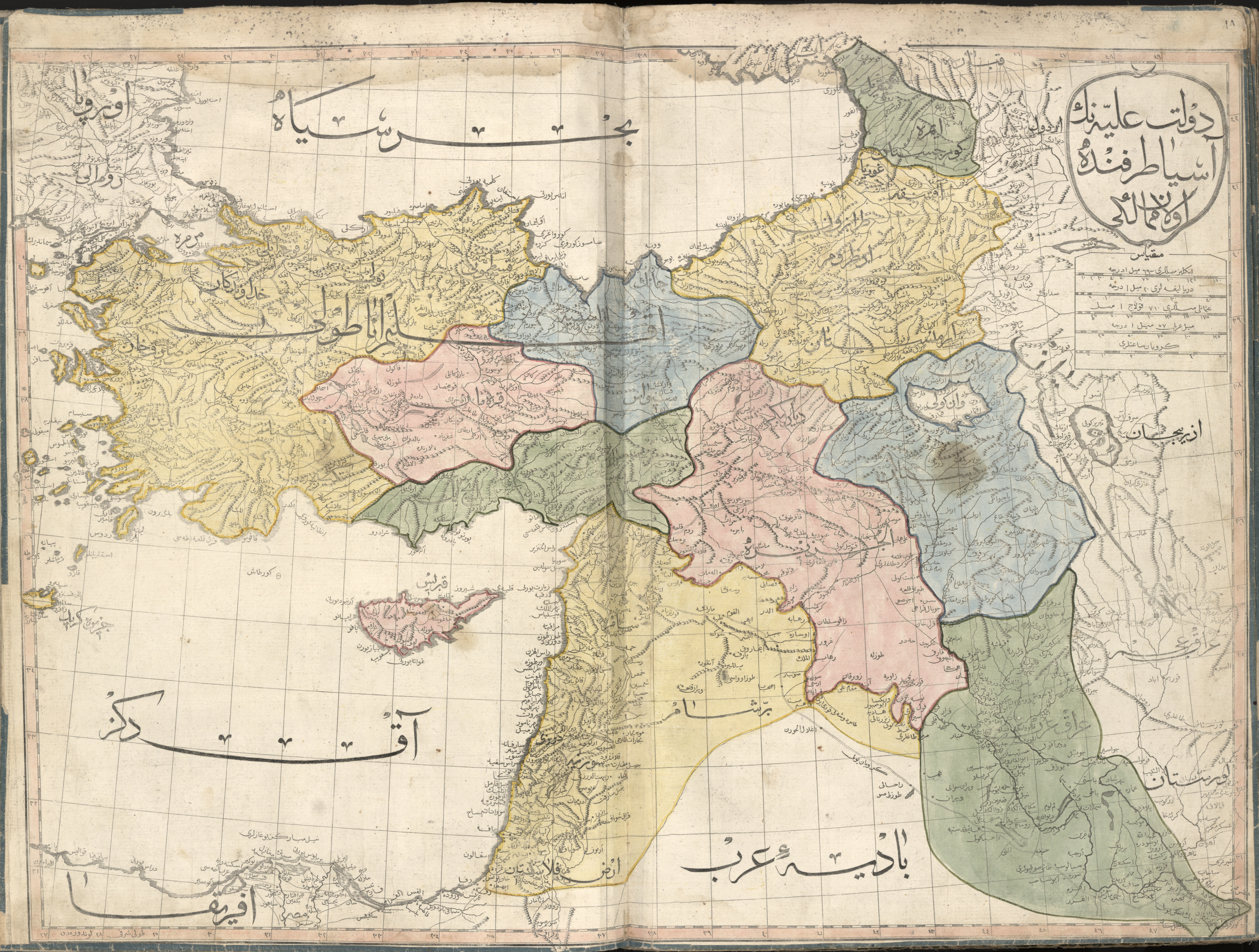
1803 map from the Cedid Atlas, the first Muslim atlas, showing Kurdistan in blue

According to Sharaf al-Din Bitlisi in his Sharafnama, the boundaries of the Kurdish land begin at the Strait of Hormuz in the Persian Gulf and stretch on an even line to the end of Malatya and Marash. Evliya Çelebi, who traveled in the region between 1640 and 1655, mentioned that Kurdistan includes Erzurum, Van, Hakkari, Cizre, Imaddiya, Mosul, Shahrizor, Harir, Ardalan, Baghdad, Derne, Derteng, until Basra.

In the 16th century, after prolonged wars, Kurdish-inhabited areas were split between the Safavid and Ottoman empires. A major division of Kurdistan occurred in the aftermath of the Battle of Chaldiran in 1514, and was formalized in the 1639 Treaty of Zuhab. In a geography textbook of late Ottoman military school by Ahmet Cevad Kurdistan span over the cities Erzurum, Van, Urfa, Sulaymanyah, Kirkuk, Mosul and Diyarbakir among others and was one out of six regions of Ottoman Asia.

=== Modern history ===
After the collapse of the Ottoman Empire, the Allies contrived to split Kurdistan (as detailed in the ultimately unratified Treaty of Sèvres) among several countries, including Kurdistan, Armenia and others. However, the reconquest of these areas by the forces of Kemal Atatürk (and other pressing issues) caused the Allies to accept the renegotiated Treaty of Lausanne (1923) and the borders of the modern Republic of Turkey, leaving the Kurds without a self-ruled region. Other Kurdish areas were assigned to the new British and French mandated states of Iraq and Syria.

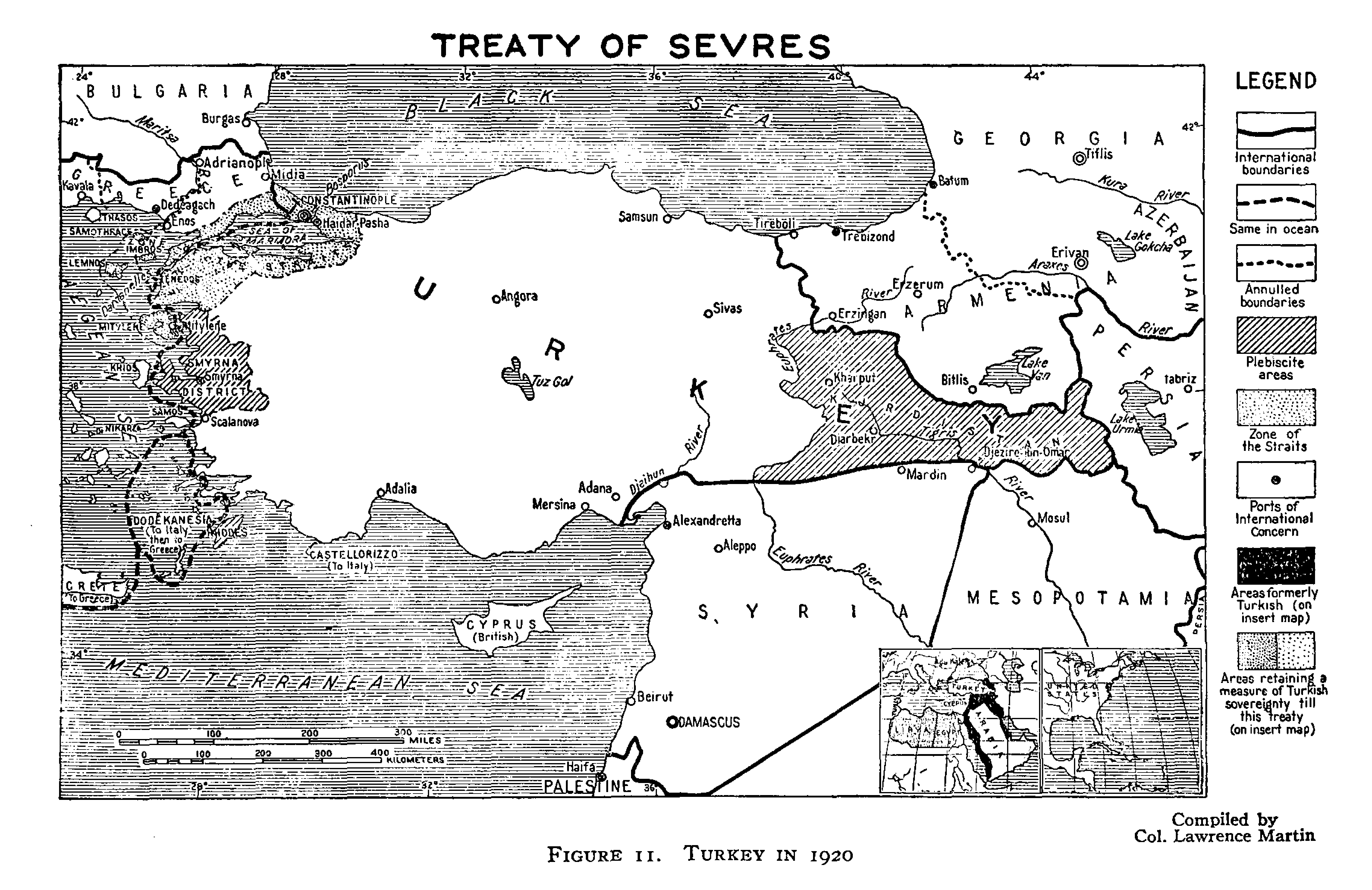
Kurdistan (shaded area) as suggested by the Treaty of Sèvres

At the San Francisco Peace Conference of 1945, the Kurdish delegation proposed consideration of territory claimed by the Kurds, which encompassed an area extending from the Mediterranean shores near Adana to the shores of the Persian Gulf near Bushehr, and included the Lur inhabited areas of southern Zagros.

The historian Jordi Tejel has identified "Greater Kurdistan" as being one of the "Kurdish myths" that the Kurdistan Democratic Party of Syria (KDPS) were involved in promoting to Kurds in Syria.

An academic source published by the University of Cambridge has described maps of greater Kurdistan created in the 1940s and forward as: "These maps have become some of the most influential propaganda tools for the Kurdish nationalist discourse. They depict a territorially exaggerated version of the territory of Kurdistan, extending into areas with no majority Kurdish populations. Despite their production with political aims related to specific claims on the demographic and ethnographic structure of the region, and their questionable methodologies, they have become 'Kurdistan in the minds of Kurds' and the boundaries they indicate have been readily accepted."

At the end of the 1991 Gulf War, the Coalition established a no-fly zone over northern Iraq to provide humanitarian relief to and safeguard the Kurds who would be subjected to Iraqi air attacks. Amid the withdrawal of Iraqi forces from three northern provinces, Kurdistan Region emerged in 1992 as an autonomous entity inside Iraq with its own local government and parliament.

A 2010 US report, written before the instability in Syria and Iraq that exists as of 2014, attested that "Kurdistan may exist by 2030". The weakening of the Iraqi state following the 2014 Northern Iraq offensive by the Islamic State of Iraq and the Levant has also presented an opportunity for independence for Iraqi Kurdistan, augmented by Turkey's move towards acceptance of such a state although it opposes moves toward Kurdish autonomy in Turkey and Syria.

==== Northern Kurdistan ====
The incorporation into Turkey of the Kurdish-inhabited regions of eastern Anatolia was opposed by many Kurds, and has resulted in a long-running separatist conflict in which tens of thousands of lives have been lost. The region saw several major Kurdish rebellions, including the Koçgiri rebellion of 1920 against the Grand National Assembly, then successive insurrections under the Turkish state, including the 1924 Sheikh Said rebellion, the Republic of Ararat in 1927, and the 1937 Dersim rebellion. All were forcefully put down by the authorities. The region was declared a closed military area from which foreigners were banned between 1925 and 1965.

In an attempt to deny their existence, the Turkish government categorized Kurds as "Mountain Turks" until 1991. The words "Kurds", "Kurdistan", or "Kurdish" were officially banned by the Turkish government. Following the military coup of 1980, the Kurdish language was officially prohibited in public and private life. Many people who spoke, published, or sang in Kurdish were arrested and imprisoned. Throughout the 1990s and early 2000s, political parties that represented Kurdish interests were banned.

In 1983, the Kurdish provinces were included in the state of emergency region, which was placed under martial law in response to the activities of the militant separatist organization the Kurdistan Workers' Party (PKK). A guerrilla war took place through the 1980s and 1990s in which much of the countryside was evacuated, thousands of Kurdish villages were destroyed by the government, and numerous summary executions were carried out by both sides. Food embargoes were placed on Kurdish villages and towns. Tens of thousands were killed in the violence and hundreds of thousands were forced to leave their homes.

Turkey has historically feared that a Kurdish state in Northern Iraq would encourage and support Kurdish separatists in the adjacent Turkish provinces, and have therefore historically strongly opposed Kurdish independence in Iraq. However, following the chaos in Iraq after the US invasion, Turkey has increasingly worked with the autonomous Kurdistan Regional Government. The word 'Kurdistan', whether written or spoken, can still lead to detention and prosecution in Turkey. Kurdistan has been characterized as an "international colony" by the scholar Ismail Besikci.

==== Iraqi Kurdistan ====
Military situation on February 6, 2026: Controlled by Syrian Kurds Controlled by Iraqi Kurds Controlled by the Islamic State in Iraq and Syria (ISIL, ISIS, IS)

The successful 2014 Northern Iraq offensive by the Islamic State of Iraq and the Levant (ISIS), and the resultant weakening of the ability of the Iraqi state to project power at the time, also presented a "golden opportunity" for the Kurds to increase their independence and possibly declare an independent Kurdish state. The Islamic State in Iraq and the Levant, who took more than 80 Turkish persons captive in Mosul during their offensive, is an enemy of Turkey, making Kurdistan useful for Turkey as a buffer state. On 28 June 2014 Hüseyin Çelik, a spokesman for the ruling Justice and Development Party (AKP), made comments to the Financial Times indicating Turkey's readiness to accept an independent Kurdistan in northern Iraq. This became increasingly less likely, however, when in July 2017, the Iraqi government declared victory in the Battle of Mosul against ISIS in the group’s last stronghold in the country. Following this, in September 2017, Iraqi Kurds held a one-sided independence referendum which eventually triggered a military operation wherein the Iraqi government forces attacked the Kurds, defeating them and forcing them to abandon the referendum. A month later, Iraq declared full victory over ISIS and re-established control over all previously occupied territory. Following the Kurds' failed attempt to achieve independence, the government of Iraq has exacted severe punishment against KRI in a number of punitive measures. In 2017, the Israeli government openly voiced support for the establishment of an independent Kurdish state in Iraq following the unilateral independence referendum. Some Kurdish officials in Iraq have described this as evidence of the Iraqi government’s aim to return to a centralised political system and abandon the federal system it adopted in 2005. In a leaked letter published by Al-Monitor in September 2023, Masrour Barzani, the prime minister of KRG warned about an imminent collapse of the federal model in Iraq (i.e. a return to centralism) and urged the United States to intervene, saying: "I write to you now at another critical juncture in our history, one that I fear we may have difficulty overcoming. …[W]e are bleeding economically and hemorrhaging politically. For the first time in my tenure as prime minister, I hold grave concerns that this dishonorable campaign against us may cause the collapse of … the very model of a Federal Iraq that the United States sponsored in 2003 and purported to stand by since." According to a report published in 2024 by the Washington Institute for Near East Policy, Kurdistan Region's autonomy "hangs in the balance" due to several punitive measures imposed against the former by the government of Iraq in an effort to punish it and ultimately strip it completely of its autonomy.

==== Syrian Civil War ====
Various sources have reported that Al-Nusra issued a fatwa calling for Kurdish women and children in Syria to be killed, and the fighting in Syria has led tens of thousands of refugees to flee to Iraq's Kurdistan region. As of 2015, Turkey was actively supporting Al-Nusra, but as of January 2017, Turkey's foreign ministry has said that Al-Nusra is a terrorist group and has acted accordingly.

== Geography ==
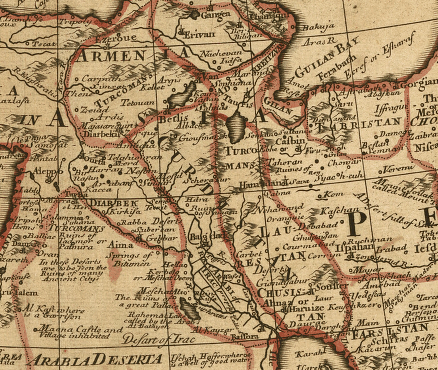
Historic map from 1721 showing borders of Curdistan provinces in Persia

According to the Encyclopædia Britannica, Kurdistan covers about 190,000 km^{2} (or 73,000 square miles), and its chief towns are Diyarbakır (Amed), Bitlis (Bedlîs) and Van (Wan) in Turkey, Erbil (Hewlêr) and Sulaymaniyah in Iraq, and Kermanshah (Kirmanşan), Sanandaj (Sine), Ilam and Mahabad (Mehabad) in Iran. According to the Encyclopaedia of Islam, Kurdistan covers around 190,000 km^{2} (73,000 sq mi) in Turkey, 125,000 km^{2} (48,000 sq mi) in Iran, 65,000 km^{2} (25,000 sq mi) in Iraq, and 12,000 km^{2} (4,600 sq mi) in Syria, with a total area of approximately 392,000 km^{2} (151,000 sq mi).

Turkish Kurdistan encompasses a large area of Eastern Anatolia region and southeastern Anatolia of Turkey and it is home to an estimated 6 to 8 million Kurds.

=== Subdivisions (Upper and Lower Kurdistan) ===
In A Dictionary of Scripture Geography (published 1846), John Miles describes Upper and Lower Kurdistan as following:

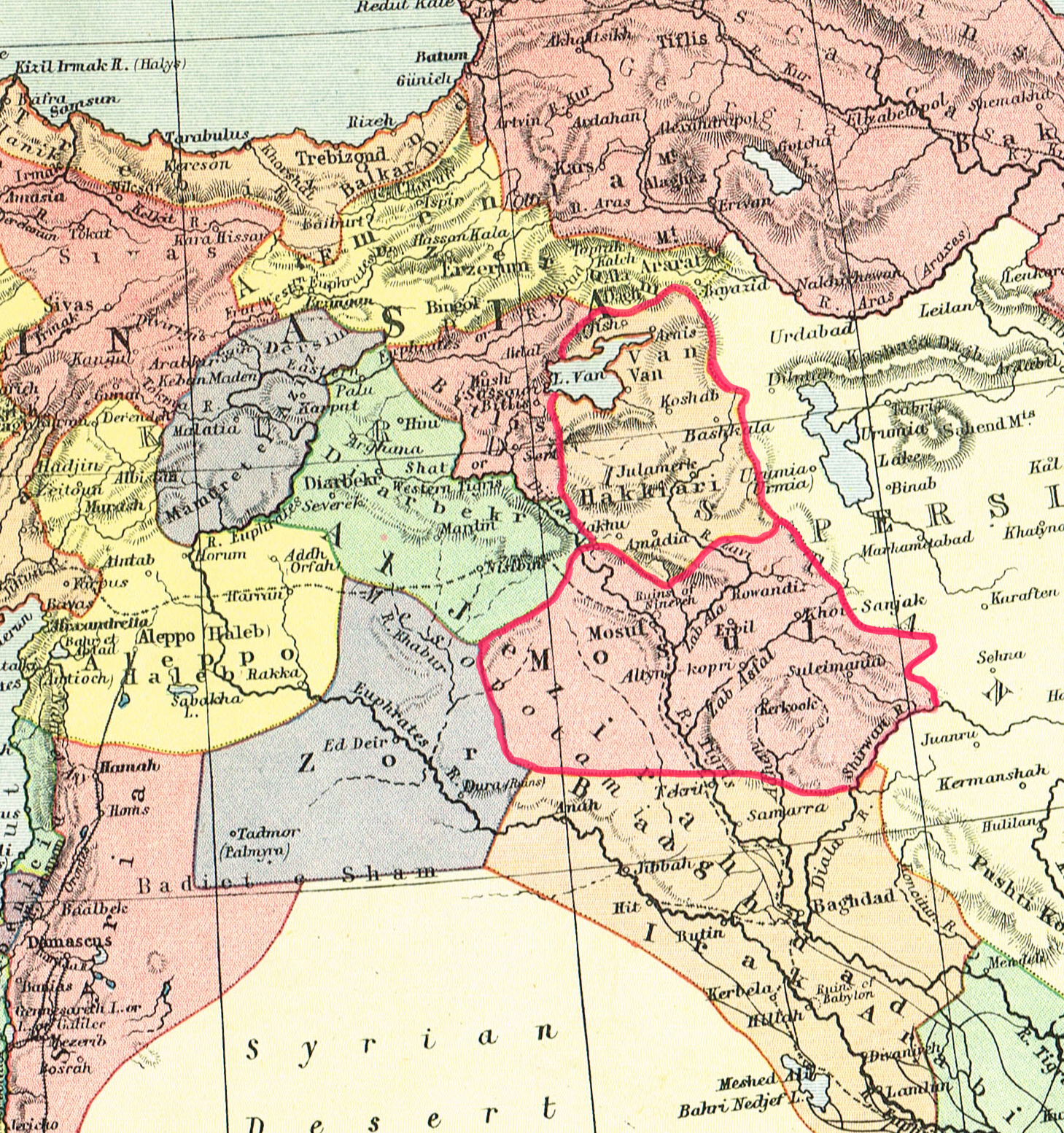
The States outlined in red are two Kurdish States named Hakkiari and Mosul in this 1902 map. They are referred to as Upper Kurdistan and Lower Kurdistan respectively.

Modern Curdistan is of much greater extent than the ancient Assyria, and is composed of two parts the Upper and Lower. In the former is the province of Ardelan, the ancient Arropachatis, now nominally a part of Irak Ajami, and belonging to the north west division called Al Jobal. It contains five others namely, Betlis, the ancient Carduchia, lying to the south and south west of the lake Van. East and south east of Betlis is the principality of Julamerick, south west of it is the principality of Amadia. the fourth is Jeezera ul Omar, a city on an island in the Tigris, and corresponding to the ancient Bezabde. the fifth and largest is Kara Djiolan, with a capital of the same name. The pashalics of Kirkook and Solimania also comprise part of Upper Curdistan. Lower Curdistan comprises all the level tract to the east of the Tigris, and the minor ranges immediately bounding the plains and reaching thence to the foot of the great range, which may justly be denominated the Alps of western Asia.

The northern, northwestern and northeastern parts of Kurdistan are referred to as upper Kurdistan, and includes the areas from west of Amed to Lake Urmia.

The lowlands of southern Kurdistan are called lower Kurdistan. The main cities in this area are Kirkuk and Arbil.

=== Climate ===
Much of the region is typified by a continental climate – hot in the summer, cold in the winter. Despite this, much of the region is fertile and has historically exported grain and livestock. Precipitation varies between 200 and 400 mm a year in the plains, and between 700 and 3,000 mm a year on the high plateau between mountain chains. The mountainous zone along the borders with Iran and Turkey experiences dry summers, rainy and sometimes snowy winters, and damp springs, while to the south the climate progressively transitions toward semi-arid and desert zones.

=== Flora and fauna ===
Kurdistan is one of the most mountainous regions in the world with a cold climate receiving annual precipitation adequate to sustain temperate forests and shrubs. Mountain chains harbor pastures and forested valleys, totaling approximately 16 million hectares (160,000 km^{2}), including firs and countryside is mostly oaks, conifers, platanus, willow, poplar and, to the west of Kurdistan, olive trees.

The region north of the mountainous region on the border with Iran and Turkey features meadow grasses and such wild trees as, Abies cilicica, Fagus sylvatica, Quercus calliprinos, Quercus brantii, Quercus infectoria, Quercus ithaburensis, Quercus macranthera, Cupressus sempervirens, Platanus orientalis, Pinus brutia, Juniperus foetidissima, Juniperus excelsa, Juniperus oxycedrus, Prunus cerasus, Salix alba, Fraxinus excelsior, Paliurus spina-christi, Olea europaea, Ficus carica, Populus euphratica, Populus nigra, Crataegus monogyna, Crataegus azarolus, Prunus cerasifera, rose hips, Cercis siliquastrum, pistachio trees, pear and Sorbus graeca. The desert in the south is mostly steppe and would feature xeric plants such as palm trees, tamarix, date palm, fraxinus, poa, white wormwood and chenopodiaceae. The steppe and desert in the south, by contrast, have such species as palm trees and date palm.

Animals found in the region include the Syrian brown bear, wild boar, gray wolf, the golden jackal, Indian crested porcupine, the red fox, goitered gazelle, Eurasian otter, striped hyena, Persian fallow deer, long-eared hedgehog, onager, mangar and the Euphrates softshell turtle. Birds include, the hooded crow, common starling, Eurasian magpie, European robin, water pipit, spotted flycatcher, namaqua dove, saker falcon, griffon vulture, little crake and collared pratincole, among others.

=== Mountains ===
Mountains are important geographical and symbolic features of Kurdish life, as evidenced by the saying "Kurds have no friends but the mountains." Mountains are regarded sacred by the Kurds. Included in the region are Mount Judi and Ararat (both prominent in Kurdish folklore), Zagros, Qandil, Shingal, Mount Abdulaziz, Kurd Mountains, Jabal al-Akrad, Shaho, Gabar, Hamrin, and Nisir.

=== Water resources ===
Iraqi Kurdistan is a region relatively rich in water, especially for countries in the Middle East region. It is the source for much of the water supply for neighboring countries. It means that political stability and peace in the region are important to the water supply of the region and preventing wars. Many think that for conserving the water "returning to traditional water-conserving cultivation techniques" will be needed, as well as "communal economy".

Rivers The plateaus and mountains of Kurdistan, which are characterized by heavy rain and snow fall, act as a water reservoir for the Near and Middle East, forming the source of the Tigris and Euphrates rivers, as well as other numerous smaller rivers, such as the Little Khabur, Khabur, Tharthar, Ceyhan, Araxes, Kura, Sefidrud, Karkha, and Hezil. Among rivers of historical importance to Kurds are the Murat (Arasān) and Buhtān rivers in Turkey; the Peshkhābur, the Little Zab, the Great Zab, and the Diyala in Iraq; and the Jaghatu (Zarrinarud), the Tātā'u (Siminarud), the Zohāb (Zahāb), and the Gāmāsiyāb in Iran.

These rivers, which flow from heights of three to four thousand meters above sea level, are significant both as water sources and for the production of energy. Iraq and Syria dammed many of these rivers and their tributaries. Turkey has an extensive dam system under construction as part of the GAP (Southeast Anatolia Project); though incomplete, the GAP already supplies a significant proportion of Turkey's electrical energy needs. Due to the extraordinary archaeological richness of the region, almost any dam impacts historic sites. With the outbreak of the Syrian civil war, Turkey was accused of withholding water from the reservoir Euphrates Lake in Syria, while filling the Atatürk dam in Turkey.

Lakes Kurdistan extends to Lake Urmia in Iran on the east. The region includes Lake Van, the largest body of water in Turkey; the only lake in the Middle East with a larger surface is Lake Urmia – though not nearly as deep as Lake Van, which has a much larger volume. Urmia, Van, as well as Zarivar Lake west of Marivan, and Lake Dukan near the city of Sulaymaniyah, are frequented by tourists.

=== Petroleum and mineral resources ===
Kurdistan Region is estimated to contain around 45 billion barrels (7.2×10^{9} m^{3}) of oil, making it the sixth largest reserve in the world. Extraction of these reserves began in 2007.

Al-Hasakah province, also known as Jazira region, has geopolitical importance of oil and is suitable for agricultural lands.

In November 2011, Exxon challenged the Iraqi central government's authority with the signing of oil and gas contracts for exploration rights to six parcels of land in Kurdistan, including one contract in the disputed territories, just east of the Kirkuk mega-field. This act caused Baghdad to threaten to revoke Exxon's contract in its southern fields, most notably the West-Qurna Phase 1 project. Exxon responded by announcing its intention to leave the West-Qurna project.

As of July 2007, the Kurdish government solicited foreign companies to invest in 40 new oil sites, with the hope of increasing regional oil production over the following five years by a factor of five, to about 1 million barrels per day (160,000 m^{3}/d). Gas and associated gas reserves are in excess of 2,800 km^{3} (100×10^{12} cu ft). Notable companies active in Kurdistan include ExxonMobil, Total, Chevron, Talisman Energy, Genel Energy, Hunt Oil, Gulf Keystone Petroleum, and Marathon Oil.

Other mineral resources that exist in significant quantities in the region include coal, copper, gold, iron, limestone (which is used to produce cement), marble, and zinc. The world's largest deposit of rock sulfur is located just southwest of Erbil.

In July 2012, Turkey and the Kurdistan Region signed an agreement by which Turkey would regularly supply the KRG with refined petroleum products in exchange for crude oil.

== Demographics ==
According to 2016 estimate Kurdish Institute of Paris, total population of Kurdistan is around 34.5 million, and Kurds making 86% of population of Northern Kurdistan. There are Arab, Turkic, Assyrian (Syriac), Armenian and Azerbaijani minorities in Northern Kurdistan. In Southern Kurdistan, there are Christian (Assyrian and Armenian) and Turkish (Turkmen) minorities as well. Iraqi and Syrian Turkmen share close ties with Turkish people and do not identify with the Turkmen of Turkmenistan and Central Asia. Kurdistan has also significant Caucasian population, Caucasians of Kurdistan included Chechens and Ingushes in Varto, Ossetians in Ahlat and Circassians. From early stage on, these Caucasians went through a process of Kurdification and thereby had Kurdish as their mother tongue.

== Culture ==
=== Media ===
==== Television ====
- Azhdar Show

== Gallery ==
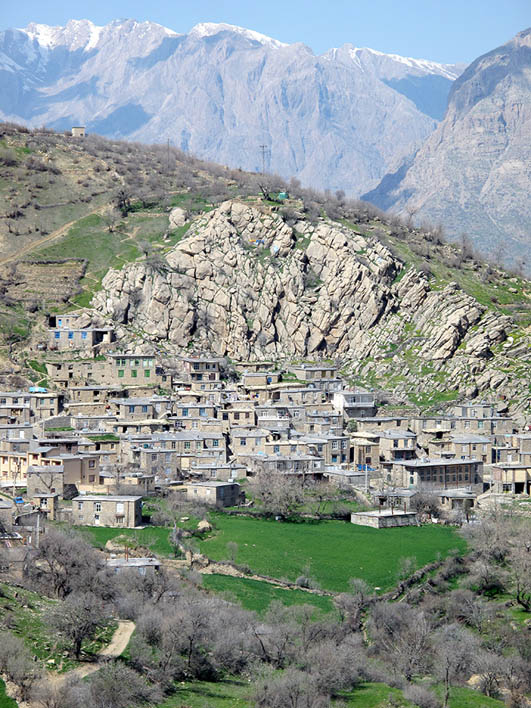
A typical Kurdish village in Hawraman, Kurdistan

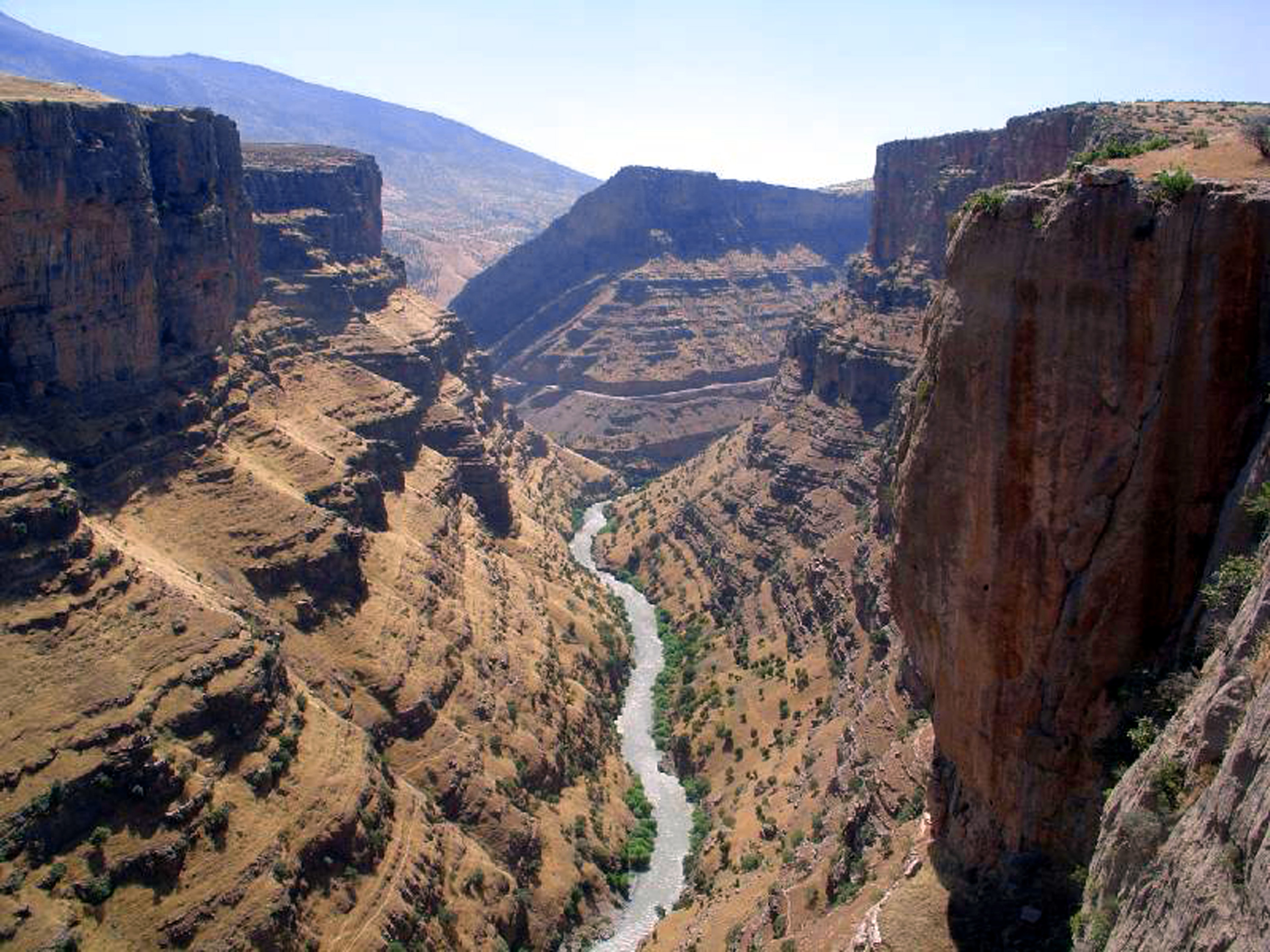
Canyon in Rawanduz, northern Iraqi Kurdistan

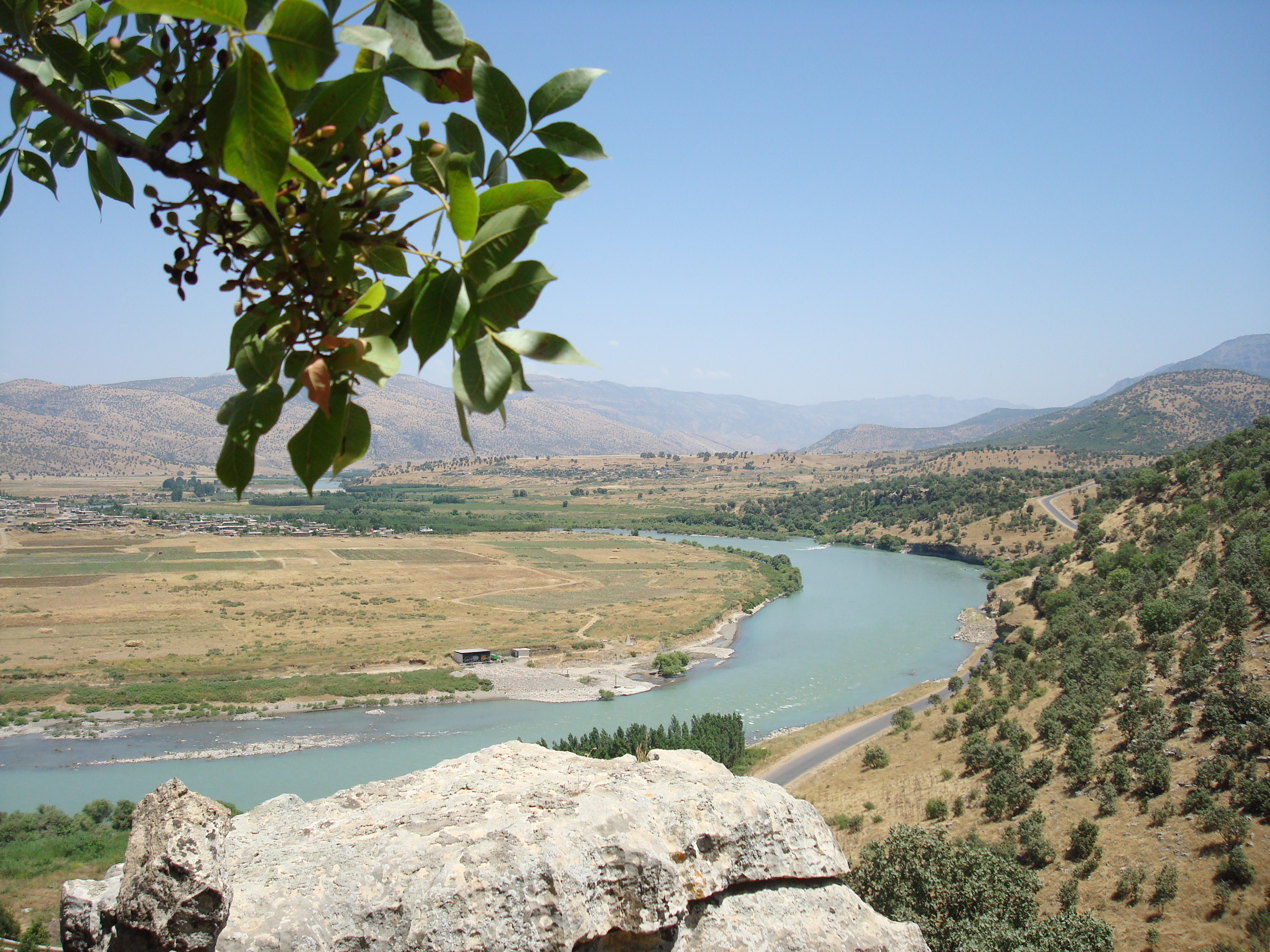
Zê river in Zebari region, Iraqi Kurdistan

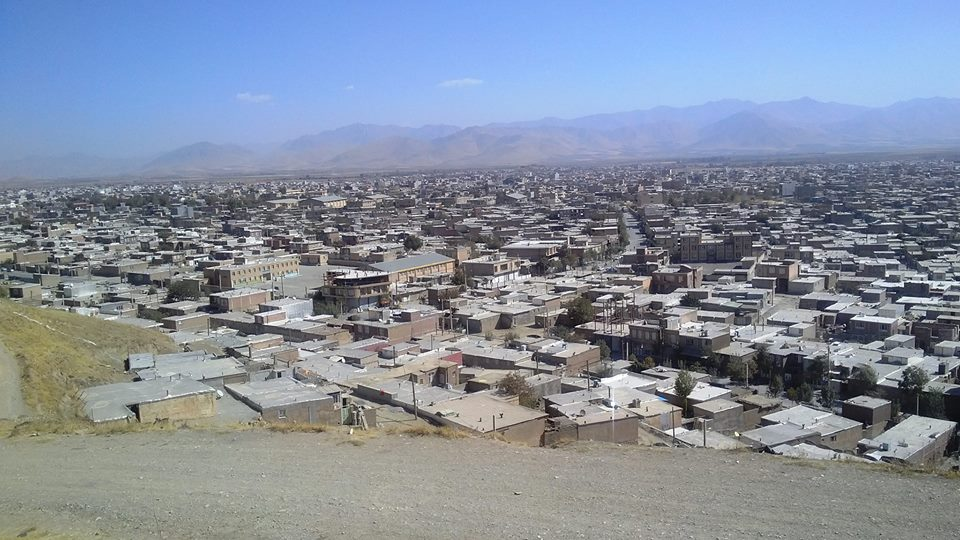
The city of Piranshahr, center of Mokrian district, northwestern Iran

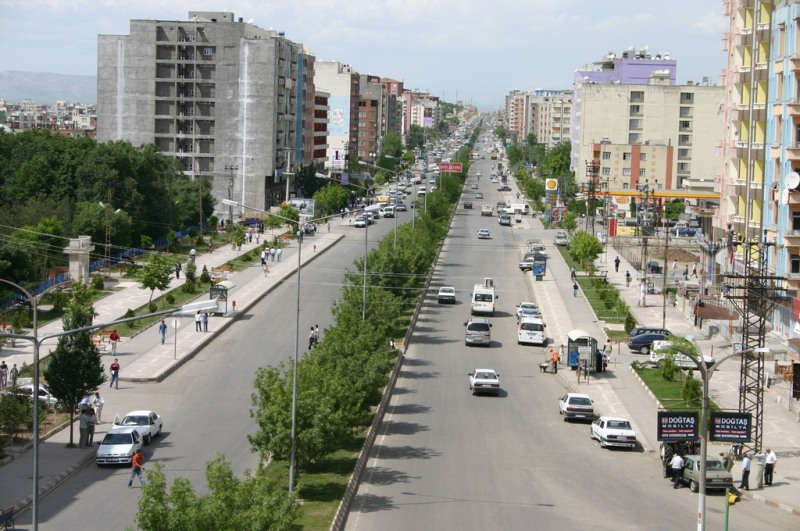
The city of Batman, Northern Kurdistan (eastern Turkey)

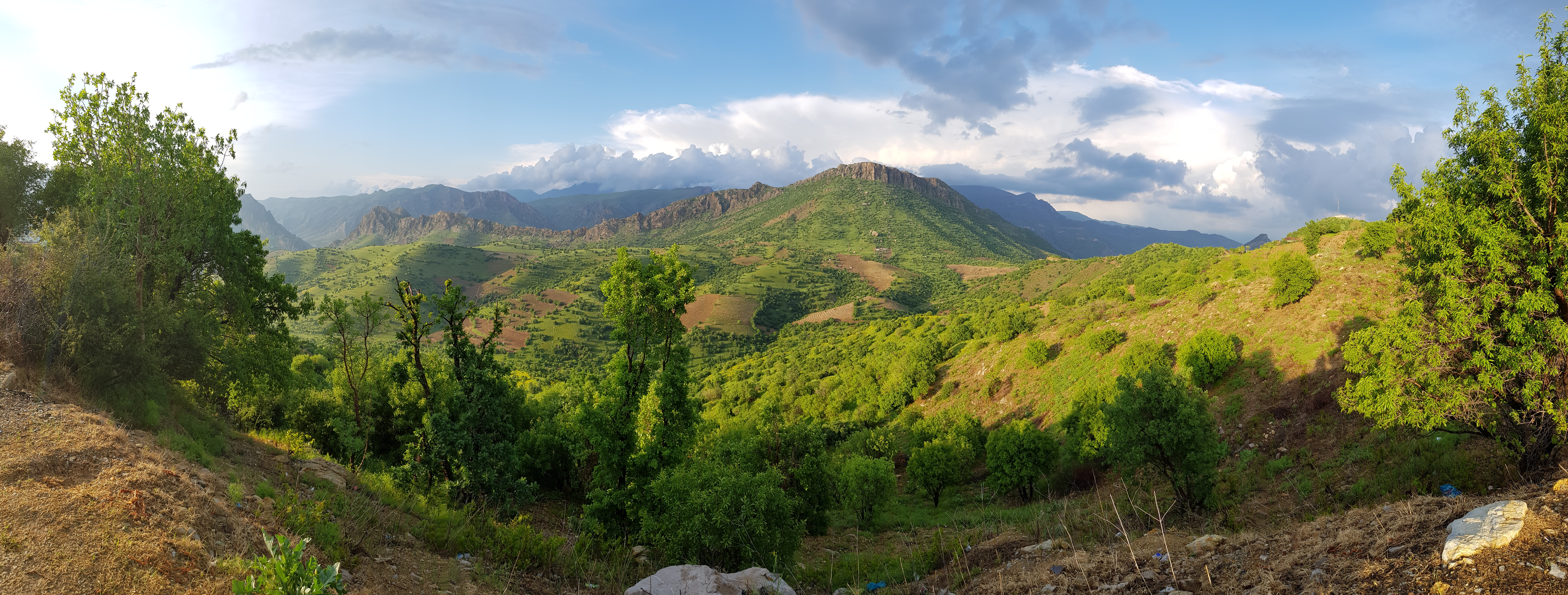
Countryside in Sulaymaniyah, Iraqi Kurdistan

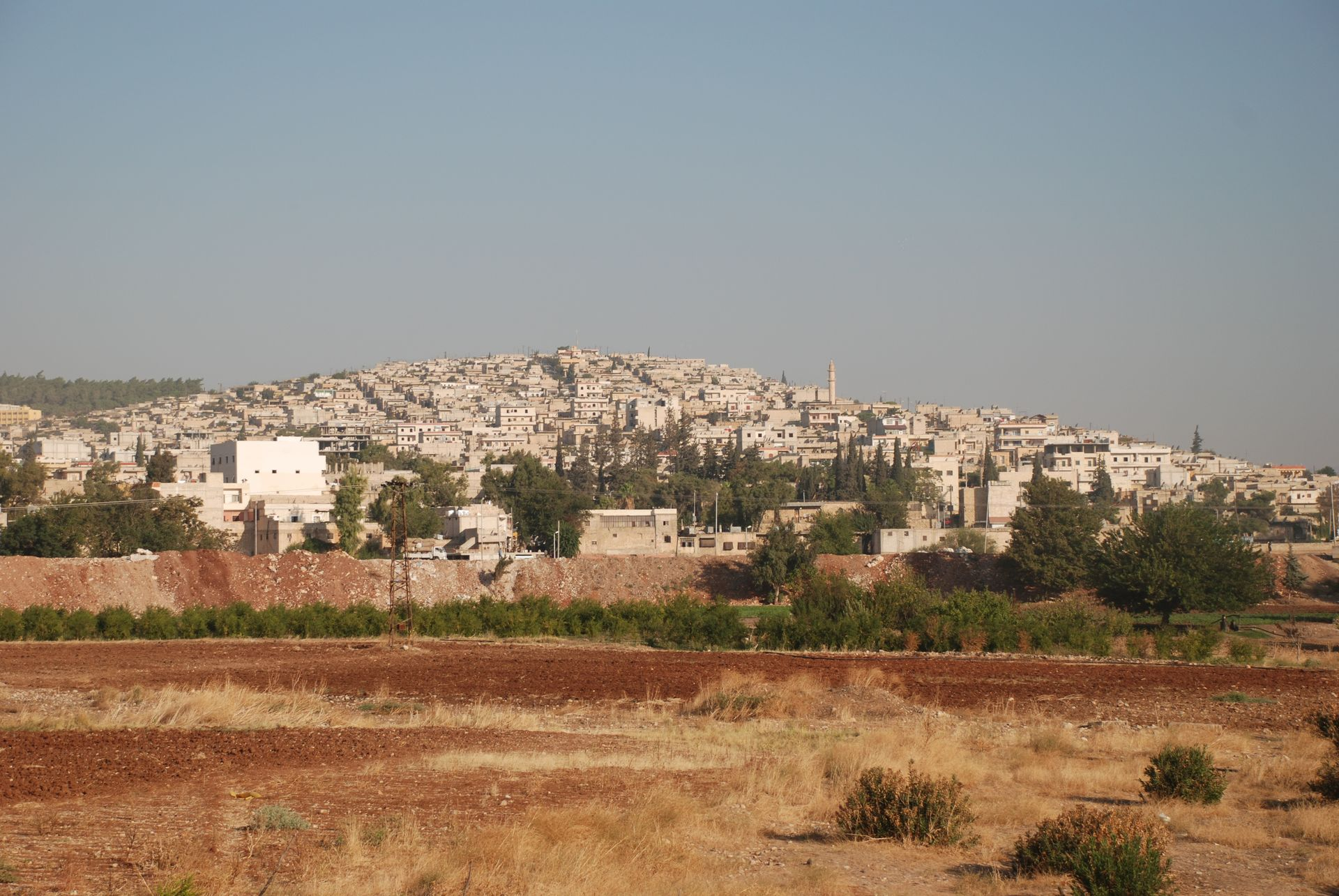
A picture of the city of Efrîn, taken in 2009 from the southern side. (Western Kurdistan)

== See also ==
- Ark of Nuh or Noah
- Armenian highlands
- Assyrian homeland
- Persia proper
- Irredentism
- Lists of active separatist movements
- Mount Judi
- Mountains of Ararat
- Whole Azerbaijan
- Wilsonian Armenia
- Zagros Mountains

== Sources ==
- Mitchell, Colin Paul (2010). "Kurdistan". In Bjork, Robert E. (ed.). The Oxford Dictionary of the Middle Ages. Oxford University Press. ISBN 978-0199574834.
- Triana, María (2017). Managing Diversity in Organizations: A Global Perspective. Taylor & Francis. ISBN 978-1-317-42368-3.
