= Ravang =

Ravang or Ravank (Persian: رونگ or راونگ) may refer to:

- Ravang, Hormozgan (راونگ - Rāvang)
- Ravang, Razavi Khorasan (رونگ - Ravang)
- Ravang, Sistan and Baluchestan (رونگ - Ravang)
