= Farizi =

Farizi or Ferizi may refer to:

- Farizi, Chenaran, a village in Razavi Khorasan Province, Iran
- Ferizi, Mashhad, a village in Razavi Khorasan Province, Iran
- Johan Ahmad Farizi (born 1990), Indonesian footballer

== See also ==
- Ferizian
