= Gavterna =

Village in Razavi Khorasan province, Iran

Gavterna Persian: گاوطرنا
- Village
- Location within Iran
- Coordinates: 36°32′26″N 59°14′14″E
- Country: Iran
- Province: Razavi Khorasan
- County: Golbahar
- District: Golmakan
- Rural District: Golmakan

Population (2016)
  - Total: 516
- Time zone: UTC+3:30 (IRST)

Gavterna (Persian: گاوطرنا) (Note: Also romanized as Gāvţernā; also known as Gāvţernāv) is a village in Golmakan Rural District of Golmakan District in Golbahar County, Razavi Khorasan province, Iran.

== Demographics ==
=== Population ===
At the time of the 2006 National Census, the village's population was 548 in 142 households, when it was in the former Golbahar District of Chenaran County. The following census in 2011 counted 459 people in 129 households. The 2016 census measured the population of the village as 516 people in 147 households.

In 2020, the district was separated from the county in the establishment of Golbahar County, and the rural district was transferred to the new Golmakan District.
