= Jam Ab =

Village in Razavi Khorasan province, Iran

Jam Ab Persian: جمع اب
- Village
- Location within Iran
- Coordinates: 36°34′19″N 59°06′11″E
- Country: Iran
- Province: Razavi Khorasan
- County: Golbahar
- District: Golmakan
- Rural District: Golmakan

Population (2016)
  - Total: 198
- Time zone: UTC+3:30 (IRST)

Jam Ab (Persian: جمع اب) (Note: Also romanized as Jam Āb and Jam‘āb; also known as Jam Āp) is a village in Golmakan Rural District of Golmakan District in Golbahar County, Razavi Khorasan province, Iran.

== Demographics ==
=== Population ===
At the time of the 2006 National Census, the village's population was 269 in 69 households, when it was in the former Golbahar District of Chenaran County. The following census in 2011 counted 249 people in 78 households. The 2016 census measured the population of the village as 198 people in 58 households.

In 2020, the district was separated from the county in the establishment of Golbahar County, and the rural district was transferred to the new Golmakan District.
