= Mava, Golbahar =

Village in Razavi Khorasan province, Iran

Mava Persian: ماوا
- Village
- Location within Iran
- Coordinates: 36°31′17″N 59°07′35″E
- Country: Iran
- Province: Razavi Khorasan
- County: Golbahar
- District: Golmakan
- Rural District: Golmakan

Population (2016)
  - Total: Below reporting threshold
- Time zone: UTC+3:30 (IRST)

Mava (Persian: ماوا) (Note: Also romanized as Ma’vā) is a village in Golmakan Rural District of Golmakan District in Golbahar County, Razavi Khorasan province, Iran.

== Demographics ==
=== Population ===
At the time of the 2006 National Census, the village's population was 32 in 10 households, when it was in the former Golbahar District of Chenaran County. The following census in 2011 counted 15 people in four households. The 2016 census measured the population of the village as below the reporting threshold.

In 2020, the district was separated from the county in the establishment of Golbahar County, and the rural district was transferred to the new Golmakan District.
