= Eslamabad, Golbahar =

Village in Razavi Khorasan province, Iran

Eslamabad Persian: اسلام اباد
- Village
- Country: Iran
- Province: Razavi Khorasan
- County: Golbahar
- District: Golmakan
- Rural District: Golmakan

Population (2016)
  - Total: 216
- Time zone: UTC+3:30 (IRST)

Eslamabad (Persian: اسلام اباد) (Note: Also romanized as Eslāmābād) is a village in Golmakan Rural District of Golmakan District in Golbahar County, Razavi Khorasan province, Iran.

== Demographics ==
=== Population ===
At the time of the 2006 National Census, the village's population was 229 in 54 households, when it was in the former Golbahar District of Chenaran County. The following census in 2011 counted 226 people in 59 households. The 2016 census measured the population of the village as 216 people in 67 households.

In 2020, the district was separated from the county in the establishment of Golbahar County, and the rural district was transferred to the new Golmakan District.
