= Esjil =

Village in Razavi Khorasan province, Iran

Esjil Persian: اسجيل
- Village
- Location within Iran
- Coordinates: 36°27′09″N 59°09′29″E
- Country: Iran
- Province: Razavi Khorasan
- County: Golbahar
- District: Golmakan
- Rural District: Cheshmeh Sabz

Population (2016)
  - Total: 1,533
- Time zone: UTC+3:30 (IRST)

Esjil (Persian: اسجيل) (Note: Also romanized as Esjīl) is a village in Cheshmeh Sabz Rural District of Golmakan District in Golbahar County, Razavi Khorasan province, Iran.

== Demographics ==
=== Population ===
At the time of the 2006 National Census, the village's population was 1,187 in 339 households, when it was in Golmakan Rural District of the former Golbahar District in Chenaran County. The following census in 2011 counted 788 people in 257 households. The 2016 census measured the population of the village as 1,533 people in 492 households. It was the most populous village in its rural district.

In 2020, the district was separated from the county in the establishment of Golbahar County. The rural district was transferred to the new Golmakan District, and Esjil was transferred to Cheshmeh Sabz Rural District created in the same district.
