= Ravang, Razavi Khorasan =

Village in Razavi Khorasan province, Iran

Ravang Persian: رونگ
- Village
- Location within Iran
- Coordinates: 36°31′17″N 59°05′19″E
- Country: Iran
- Province: Razavi Khorasan
- County: Golbahar
- District: Golmakan
- Rural District: Golmakan

Population (2016)
  - Total: 12
- Time zone: UTC+3:30 (IRST)

Ravang (Persian: رونگ) (Note: Also known as Ravank) is a village in Golmakan Rural District of Golmakan District in Golbahar County, Razavi Khorasan province, Iran.

== Demographics ==
=== Population ===
At the time of the 2006 National Census, the village's population was 26 in five households, when it was in the former Golbahar District of Chenaran County. The following census in 2011 counted 15 people in four households. The 2016 census measured the population of the village as 12 people in four households.

In 2020, the district was separated from the county in the establishment of Golbahar County, and the rural district was transferred to the new Golmakan District.
