= Golmakan, Golbahar =

City in Razavi Khorasan province, Iran

Golmakan Persian: گلمكان
- City
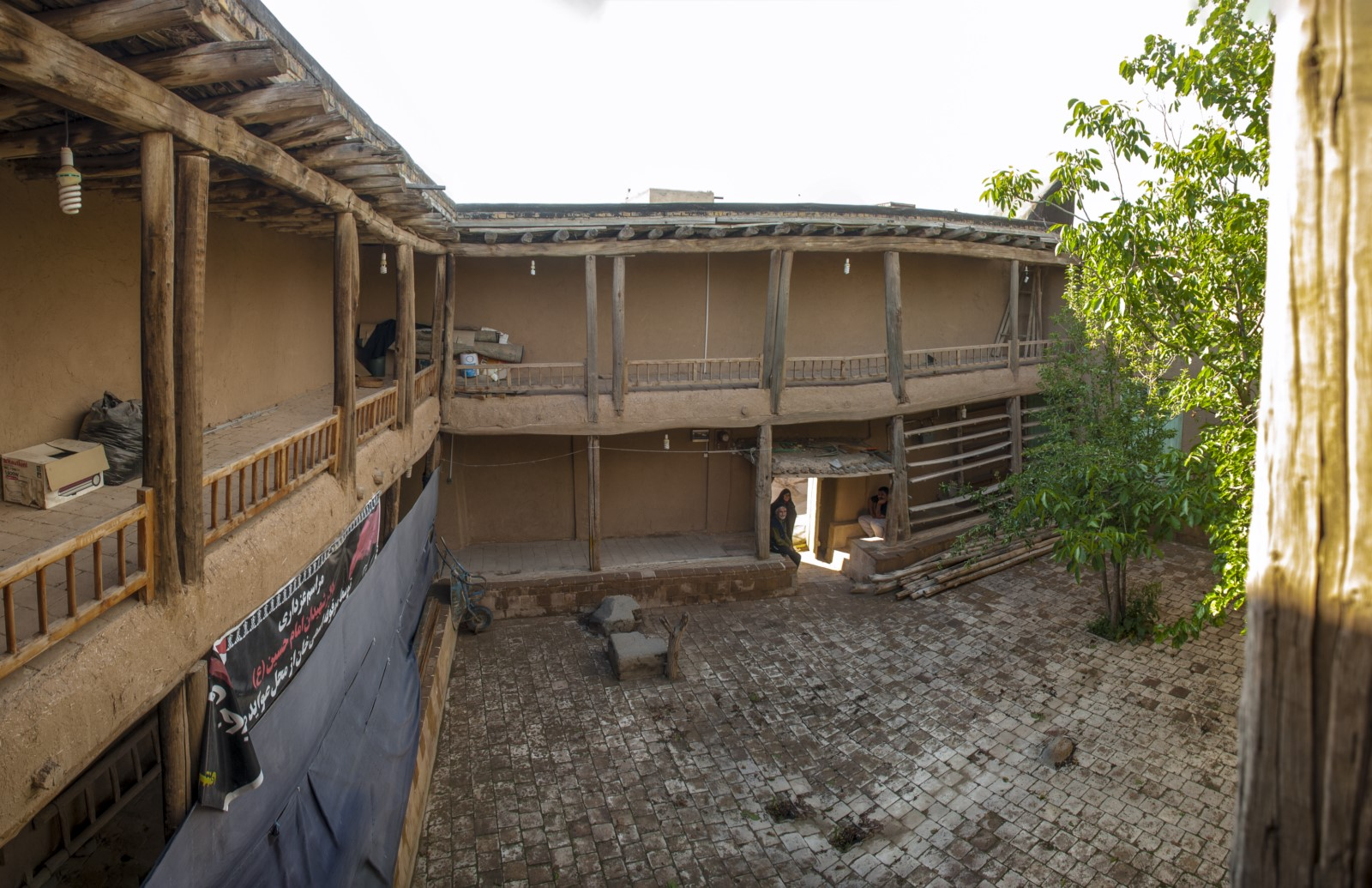
- Old Hoseyniyeh of Golmakan

- Location within Iran
- Coordinates: 36°28′56″N 59°09′31″E
- Country: Iran
- Province: Razavi Khorasan
- County: Golbahar
- District: Golmakan
- Established: 2007

Population (2016)
  - Total: 8,373
- Time zone: UTC+3:30 (IRST)

Golmakan (Persian: گلمكان) (Note: Also romanized as Golmakān; also known as Gulmakān) is a city in, and the capital of, Golmakan District in Golbahar County, Razavi Khorasan province, Iran. As a village, it was the capital of Golmakan Rural District until its capital was transferred to the village of Ahmadabad.

== Demographics ==
=== Population ===
At the time of the 2006 National Census, Golmakan's population was 6,413 in 1,620 households, when it was a village in Golmakan Rural District of the former Golbahar District in Chenaran County. The following census in 2011 counted 9,534 people in 3,063 households, by which time the village had been converted to a city. The 2016 census measured the population of the city as 8,373 people in 2,861 households.

In 2020, the district was separated from the county in the establishment of Golbahar County. The city and the rural district were transferred to the new Golmakan District.

== Climate ==
Golmakan has a cold semi-arid climate (BSk) according to the Köppen climate classification.

Climate data for Golmakan (1987-2010 normals), elevation:1,176.0 m (3,858.3 ft)
Month	Jan	Feb	Mar	Apr	May	Jun	Jul	Aug	Sep	Oct	Nov	Dec	Year
Mean daily maximum °C (°F)	6.5 (43.7)	8.2 (46.8)	13.1 (55.6)	20.1 (68.2)	25.2 (77.4)	30.9 (87.6)	32.8 (91.0)	32.1 (89.8)	27.7 (81.9)	21.5 (70.7)	14.8 (58.6)	9.4 (48.9)	20.2 (68.4)
Daily mean °C (°F)	1.3 (34.3)	3.4 (38.1)	8.0 (46.4)	13.8 (56.8)	18.4 (65.1)	23.2 (73.8)	25.2 (77.4)	23.8 (74.8)	18.9 (66.0)	13.8 (56.8)	8.5 (47.3)	4.1 (39.4)	13.5 (56.4)
Mean daily minimum °C (°F)	−3.5 (25.7)	−1.8 (28.8)	2.3 (36.1)	7.3 (45.1)	11.2 (52.2)	15.2 (59.4)	17.4 (63.3)	15.3 (59.5)	10.1 (50.2)	5.8 (42.4)	2.1 (35.8)	−1.0 (30.2)	6.7 (44.1)
Average precipitation mm (inches)	20.7 (0.81)	26.3 (1.04)	46.7 (1.84)	37.8 (1.49)	23.8 (0.94)	6.7 (0.26)	1.6 (0.06)	0.7 (0.03)	2.4 (0.09)	7.4 (0.29)	14.2 (0.56)	19.7 (0.78)	208 (8.19)
Average relative humidity (%)	67	63	59	54	43	30	29	28	34	44	56	63	48
Average dew point °C (°F)	−4.4 (24.1)	−3.4 (25.9)	−0.1 (31.8)	4.4 (39.9)	6.1 (43.0)	5.9 (42.6)	7.3 (45.1)	5.5 (41.9)	3.4 (38.1)	1.6 (34.9)	−0.4 (31.3)	−2.7 (27.1)	1.9 (35.5)
Mean monthly sunshine hours	155.9	158.5	170.0	215.5	280.9	341.1	357.3	354.6	298.4	252.8	192.0	153.9	2,930.9
Source: IRIMO(mean maximum temperature 1987-2005)
