= Azhdar Show =

- Genre: Variety show
- Presented by: Azhdar Wahbi
- Country of origin: Kurdistan

Original release
- Network: Korek TV
- Release: October 2009 – present

The Azhdar Show is a live Kurdish variety program hosted by the pop star, singer and entertainer Azhdar Wahbi in Kurdistan. The show features interviews and performances by Azhdar and his guests. The show has been on the air since October 2009 and airs every Friday night on Korek TV.
