= Kushkan, Razavi Khorasan =

Village in Razavi Khorasan province, Iran

Kushkan Persian: كوشكان
- Village
- Location within Iran
- Coordinates: 36°29′02″N 59°11′12″E
- Country: Iran
- Province: Razavi Khorasan
- County: Golbahar
- District: Golmakan
- Rural District: Golmakan

Population (2016)
  - Total: 123
- Time zone: UTC+3:30 (IRST)

Kushkan (Persian: كوشكان) (Note: Also romanized as Kūshkān; also known as Kūshkān-e Bālā) is a village in Golmakan Rural District of Golmakan District in Golbahar County, Razavi Khorasan province, Iran.

== Demographics ==
=== Population ===
At the time of the 2006 National Census, the village's population was 76 in 18 households, when it was in the former Golbahar District of Chenaran County. The following census in 2011 counted 93 people in 28 households. The 2016 census measured the population of the village as 123 people in 41 households.

In 2020, the district was separated from the county in the establishment of Golbahar County, and the rural district was transferred to the new Golmakan District.
