= Nowzad, Razavi Khorasan =

Village in Razavi Khorasan province, Iran

Nowzad Persian: نوزاد
- Village
- Location within Iran
- Coordinates: 36°28′59″N 59°08′07″E
- Country: Iran
- Province: Razavi Khorasan
- County: Golbahar
- District: Golmakan
- Rural District: Golmakan

Population (2016)
  - Total: 34
- Time zone: UTC+3:30 (IRST)

Nowzad (Persian: نوزاد) (Note: Also romanized as Nowzād) is a village in Golmakan Rural District of Golmakan District in Golbahar County, Razavi Khorasan province, Iran.

== Demographics ==
=== Population ===
At the time of the 2006 National Census, the village's population was 112 in 33 households, when it was in the former Golbahar District of Chenaran County. The following census in 2011 counted 112 people in 35 households. The 2016 census measured the population of the village as 34 people in nine households.

In 2020, the district was separated from the county in the establishment of Golbahar County, and the rural district was transferred to the new Golmakan District.
