= Soltanabad, Sahneh =

Soltanabad سلطان اباد
- Village
- Location within Iran
- Coordinates: 34°40′57″N 47°21′42″E
- Country: Iran
- Province: Kermanshah
- County: Sahneh
- Bakhsh: Dinavar
- Rural District: Horr

Population (2006)
  - Total: 54
- Time zone: UTC+3:30 (IRST)
  - Summer (DST): UTC+4:30 (IRDT)

Soltanabad (Persian: سلطان اباد, also Romanized as Solţānābād) is a village in Horr Rural District, Dinavar District, Sahneh County, Kermanshah Province, Iran. At the 2006 census, its population was 54, in 19 families.
