= Sultanpur, Karnataka =

Coordinates: 16.187°N 74.6575°E

Sultanpur
- Village
- Interactive map of Sultanpur
- Country: India
- State: Karnataka
- District: Belgaum
- Talukas: Raybag

Government
  - Type: Panchayat raj
  - Body: Gram panchayat

Languages
  - Official: Kannada
- Time zone: UTC+5:30 (IST)
- ISO 3166 code: IN-KA
- Vehicle registration: KA
- Website: karnataka.gov.in

Sultanpur is a village in Belgaum district of Karnataka, India.
