= Soltanabad-e Qezel Tappeh =

Soltanabad-e Qezel Tappeh سلطان آباد قزل تپه
- Village
- Location within Iran
- Coordinates: 36°21′16″N 47°42′54″E
- Country: Iran
- Province: Kurdistan
- County: Bijar
- Bakhsh: Korani
- Rural District: Korani

Population (2006)
  - Total: 214
- Time zone: UTC+3:30 (IRST)
  - Summer (DST): UTC+4:30 (IRDT)

Soltanabad-e Qezel Tappeh (Persian: سلطان آباد قزل تپه, also romanized as Solţānābād-e Qezel Tappeh; also known as Solţānābād) is a village in Korani Rural District, Korani District, Bijar County, Kurdistan Province, Iran. At the 2006 census its population was 214, in 50 families. The village is populated by Azerbaijanis.
