= Sultanpur Gram Panchayat =

Sultanpur panchayat
- Gram Panchayat
- Location in bihar, India Sultanpur panchayat (India)
- Coordinates: 25°40′48.0″N 85°13′12.0″E
- Country: India
- State: Bihar
- District: vaishali
- Assembly Constituency: Hajipur assembly constituency (AC.123)

Languages
  - Official: Hindi
- Time zone: UTC+5:30 (IST)
- ISO 3166 code: IN-BR

Sultanpur is a Gram panchayat in hajipur, vaishali district, bihar.

== Geography ==
This panchayat is located at 25°40′48.0″N 85°13′12.0″E

== Panchayat office ==
Samudayik bhawan Mohabatpur

== Nearest City/Town ==
Hajipur (Distance 4 km)

== Nearest major road highway or river ==
NH 103 (National highway 103) NH 19 (National highway 19 ) OTHER ROADWAY

== Villages in panchayat ==
There are villages in this panchayat

s.n	villages
1	Sherpur
2	Imadpur Sultan
3	Mangurahi
4	Musapur Suboch
5	Mohabatpur
6	Jethui Nizamat
7	Jethui Nizamat
8	Ibrahimpur Bazid urfIbrahimpat
9	Sultanpur
