= Salmanabad, Razavi Khorasan =

Village in Razavi Khorasan province, Iran

Salmanabad Persian: سلمان اباد
- Village
- Location within Iran
- Coordinates: 36°27′45″N 59°11′01″E
- Country: Iran
- Province: Razavi Khorasan
- County: Golbahar
- District: Golmakan
- Rural District: Golmakan

Population (2011)
  - Total: 39
- Time zone: UTC+3:30 (IRST)

Salmanabad (Persian: سلمان اباد) (Note: Also romanized as Salmānābād; also known as Kalāteh-ye Solţānābād, Solţānābād, and Solţānābād-e 'Āsjīl (سلطان اباداسجيل)) is a village in Golmakan Rural District of Golmakan District in Golbahar County, Razavi Khorasan province, Iran.

== Demographics ==
=== Population ===
At the time of the 2006 National Census, the village's population was 72 in 20 households, when it was in the former Golbahar District of Chenaran County. The following census in 2011 counted 39 people in 13 households. The village did not appear in the 2016 census.

In 2020, the district was separated from the county in the establishment of Golbahar County, and the rural district was transferred to the new Golmakan District.
