= Abqad, Mashhad =

Abqad ابقد
- Village
- Location within Iran
- Coordinates: 36°46′00″N 59°27′47″E
- Country: Iran
- Province: Razavi Khorasan
- County: Mashhad
- Bakhsh: Central
- Rural District: Darzab

Population (2006)
  - Total: 507
- Time zone: UTC+3:30 (IRST)
  - Summer (DST): UTC+4:30 (IRDT)

Abqad (Persian: ابقد, also Romanized as Ābqad; also known as Owqī) is a village in Darzab Rural District, in the Central District of Mashhad County, Razavi Khorasan Province, Iran. At the 2006 census, its population was 507, in 124 families.

== See also ==
- List of cities, towns and villages in Razavi Khorasan Province
