= Deh-e Soltanabad =

Deh-e Soltanabad ده سلطان اباد
- Village
- Location within Iran
- Coordinates: 28°56′25″N 58°48′43″E
- Country: Iran
- Province: Kerman
- County: Fahraj
- Bakhsh: Central
- Rural District: Fahraj

Population (2006)
  - Total: 197
- Time zone: UTC+3:30 (IRST)
  - Summer (DST): UTC+4:30 (IRDT)

Deh-e Soltanabad (Persian: ده سلطان اباد, also Romanized as Deh-e Solṭānābād; also known as Solṭānābād) is a village in Fahraj Rural District, in the Central District of Fahraj County, Kerman Province, Iran. At the 2006 census, its population was 197, in 40 families.
