= Soltanabad, Kurdistan =

Soltanabad سلطان آباد
- Village
- Location within Iran
- Coordinates: 34°57′52″N 48°05′07″E
- Country: Iran
- Province: Kurdistan
- County: Qorveh
- Bakhsh: Chaharduli
- Rural District: Chaharduli-ye Sharqi

Population (2006)
  - Total: 134
- Time zone: UTC+3:30 (IRST)
  - Summer (DST): UTC+4:30 (IRDT)

Soltanabad (Persian: سلطان آباد, also Romanized as Solţānābād) is a village in Chaharduli-ye Sharqi Rural District, Chaharduli District, Qorveh County, Kurdistan Province, Iran. At the 2006 census, its population was 134, in 28 families. The village is populated by Kurds.
