= Sultanpur Jala =

Sultanpur Jala Sultānpur Jāla
- Village
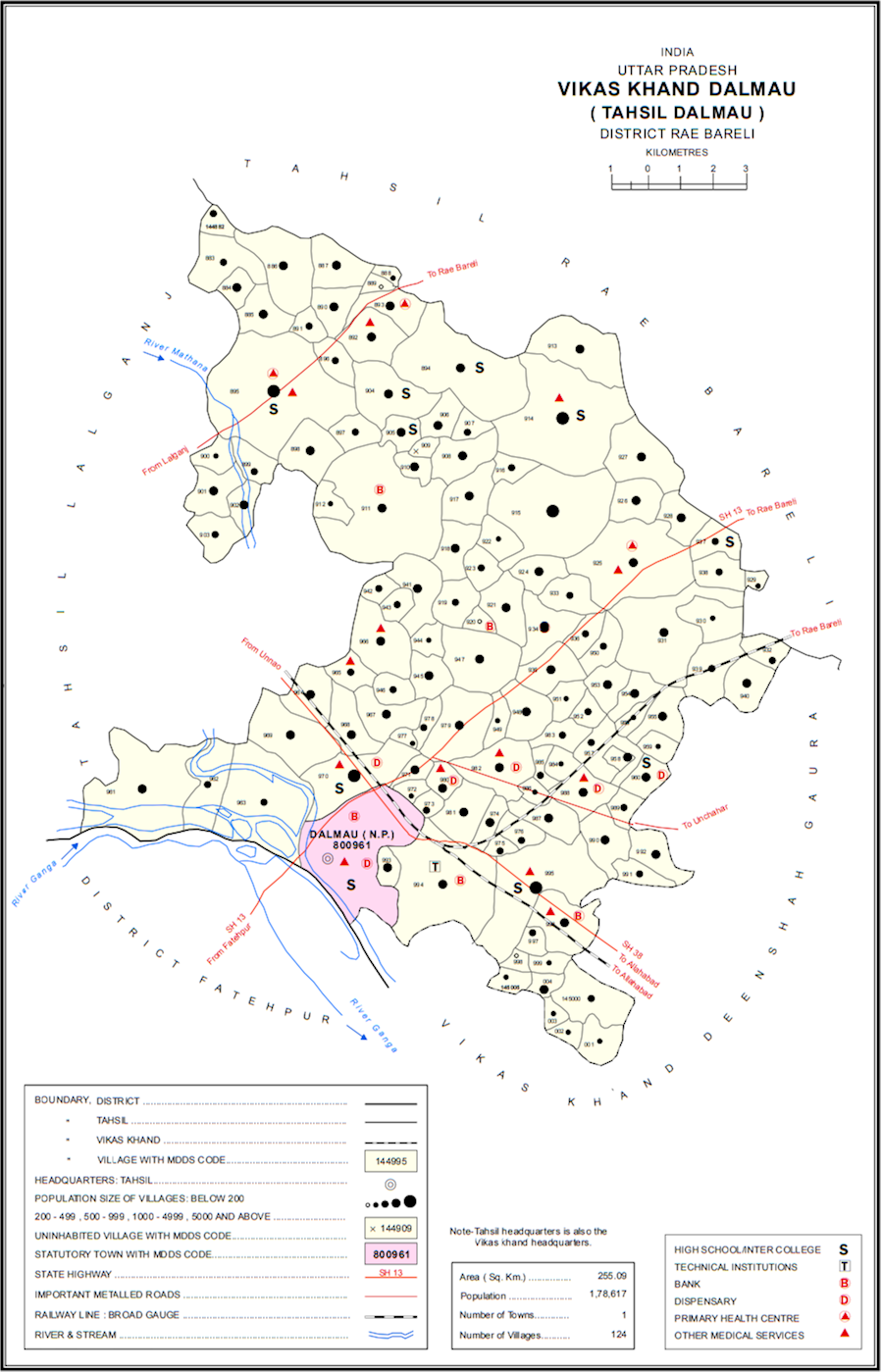
- Map showing Sultanpur Jala (#896) in Dalmau CD block

- Location in Uttar Pradesh, India
- Coordinates: 26.197573°N 81.041414°E
- Country India: India
- State: Uttar Pradesh
- District: Raebareli

Area
  - Total: 1.223 km^{2} (0.472 sq mi)

Population (2011)
  - Total: 839
  - Density: 686/km^{2} (1,780/sq mi)

Languages
  - Official: Hindi
- Time zone: UTC+5:30 (IST)
- Vehicle registration: UP-35

Sultanpur Jala is a village in Dalmau block of Rae Bareli district, Uttar Pradesh, India. As of 2011, it has a population of 839 people, in 157 households. It has one primary school and no healthcare facilities.

The 1961 census recorded Sultanpur Jala as comprising two hamlets, with a total population of 287 people (144 male and 143 female), in 50 households and 46 physical houses. The area of the village was given as 297 acres (120 ha).

The 1981 census recorded Sultanpur Jala as having a population of 474 people, in 82 households, and having an area of 121.82 hectares (301.0 acres). The main staple foods were listed as wheat and rice.
