= Soltanabad-e Chetaq =

Soltanabad-e Chetaq سلطان آباد چتاق
- Village
- Location within Iran
- Coordinates: 36°17′59″N 47°27′06″E
- Country: Iran
- Province: Kurdistan
- County: Bijar
- Bakhsh: Korani
- Rural District: Taghamin

Population (2006)
  - Total: 118
- Time zone: UTC+3:30 (IRST)
  - Summer (DST): UTC+4:30 (IRDT)

Soltanabad-e Chetaq (Persian: سلطان آباد چتاق, also Romanized as Solţānābād-e Chetāq and Solţānābād-e Cheţāq; also known as Solţānābād) is a village in Taghamin Rural District, Korani District, Bijar County, Kurdistan Province, Iran. At the 2006 census, its population was 118, with 23 families. The village is populated by Azerbaijanis.
