= Cheshmeh Sabz Rural District =

Rural district in Razavi Khorasan province, Iran

Cheshmeh Sabz Rural District Persian: دهستان چشمه‌سبز
- Rural District
- Location within Iran
- Coordinates: 36°25′N 59°06′E
- Country: Iran
- Province: Razavi Khorasan
- County: Golbahar
- District: Golmakan
- Established: 2020
- Capital: Chenar

Population (2019)
  - Total: 350
- Time zone: UTC+3:30 (IRST)

Cheshmeh Sabz Rural District (Persian: دهستان چشمه‌سبز) is in Golmakan District of Golbahar County, Razavi Khorasan province, Iran. Its capital is the village of Chenar, whose population at the time of the 2016 National Census was 350 people in 111 households.

== History ==
In 2020, Golbahar District was separated from Chenaran County in the establishment of Golbahar County, and Cheshmeh Sabz Rural District was created in the new Golmakan District.

== Other villages in the rural district ==
- Argi
- Dowlatabad
- Esjil
- Farizi
- Hasan Aqeh
- Hoseynabad
- Kahu
- Kalateh-ye Payeh
