= Soltanabad-e Koruni =

Soltanabad-e Koruni سلطان ابادكروني
- Village
- Location within Iran
- Coordinates: 29°44′43″N 51°35′29″E
- Country: Iran
- Province: Fars
- County: Kazerun
- Bakhsh: Central
- Rural District: Deris

Population (2006)
  - Total: 216
- Time zone: UTC+3:30 (IRST)
  - Summer (DST): UTC+4:30 (IRDT)

Soltanabad-e Koruni (Persian: سلطان ابادكروني, also Romanized as Solţānābād-e Korūnī; also known as Solţānābād) is a village in Deris Rural District, in the Central District of Kazerun County, Fars province, Iran. At the 2006 census, its population was 216, in 46 families.
