= Soltanabad, Chaharmahal and Bakhtiari =

Soltanabad سلطان اباد
- Village
- Location within Iran
- Coordinates: 31°57′19″N 50°48′55″E
- Country: Iran
- Province: Chaharmahal and Bakhtiari
- County: Borujen
- Bakhsh: Boldaji
- Rural District: Chaghakhor

Population (2006)
  - Total: 97
- Time zone: UTC+3:30 (IRST)
  - Summer (DST): UTC+4:30 (IRDT)

Soltanabad (Persian: سلطان اباد, also Romanized as Solţānābād) is a village in Chaghakhor Rural District, Boldaji District, Borujen County, Chaharmahal and Bakhtiari Province, Iran. At the 2006 census, its population was 97, in 28 families. The village is populated by Lurs.
