= Nam Zad =

Nam Zad نم زاد
- Village
- Location within Iran
- Coordinates: 29°07′54″N 56°44′16″E
- Country: Iran
- Province: Kerman
- County: Baft
- Bakhsh: Central
- Rural District: Bezenjan

Population (2006)
  - Total: 282
- Time zone: UTC+3:30 (IRST)
  - Summer (DST): UTC+4:30 (IRDT)

Nam Zad (Persian: نم زاد, also Romanized as Nam Zād; also known as Nowzād and Nūrzād) is a village in Bezenjan Rural District, in the Central District of Baft County, Kerman Province, Iran. At the 2006 census, its population was 282, in 61 families.
