= Nowzad, Sarbisheh =

Nowzad نوزاد
- Village
- Location within Iran
- Coordinates: 32°15′46″N 59°35′45″E
- Country: Iran
- Province: South Khorasan
- County: Sarbisheh
- Bakhsh: Mud
- Rural District: Naharjan

Population (2006)
  - Total: 27
- Time zone: UTC+3:30 (IRST)
  - Summer (DST): UTC+4:30 (IRDT)

Nozad (Persian: نوزاد, also Romanized as Nowzad; also known as Nowzār, Nauzār, and Nowz̄ar) is a village in Naharjan Rural District, Mud District, Sarbisheh County, South Khorasan Province, Iran. At the 2006 census, its population was 27, in 8 families.
