= Soltanabad, Nehbandan =

Soltanabad سلطان اباد
- Village
- Location within Iran
- Coordinates: 31°47′25″N 59°46′04″E
- Country: Iran
- Province: South Khorasan
- County: Nehbandan
- Bakhsh: Central
- Rural District: Neh

Population (2006)
  - Total: 162
- Time zone: UTC+3:30 (IRST)
  - Summer (DST): UTC+4:30 (IRDT)

Soltanabad (Persian: سلطان اباد, also Romanized as Solţānābād; also known as Soltan Abad Behandan and Solţānābād-e Behandān) is a village in Neh Rural District, in the Central District of Nehbandan County, South Khorasan Province, Iran. At the 2006 census, its population was 162, in 32 families.
