= Soltanabad, Sarab =

Soltanabad سلطان اباد
- Village
- Location within Iran
- Coordinates: 37°51′08″N 47°49′15″E
- Country: Iran
- Province: East Azerbaijan
- County: Sarab
- Bakhsh: Central
- Rural District: Molla Yaqub

Government
  - کارگر ساده: Mr. Hamed Rezaei

Population (2021)
  - Total: ~3,000
- Time zone: UTC+3:30 (IRST)
  - Summer (DST): UTC+4:30 (IRDT)

Soltanabad (Persian: سلطان اباد, also Romanized as Solţānābād) is a village in Molla Yaqub Rural District, in the Central District of Sarab County, East Azerbaijan Province, Iran. At the 2006 census, its population was 356, in 64 families.
