= Eqbaliyeh =

City in Qazvin province, Iran

Eqbaliyeh Persian: اقباليه
- City
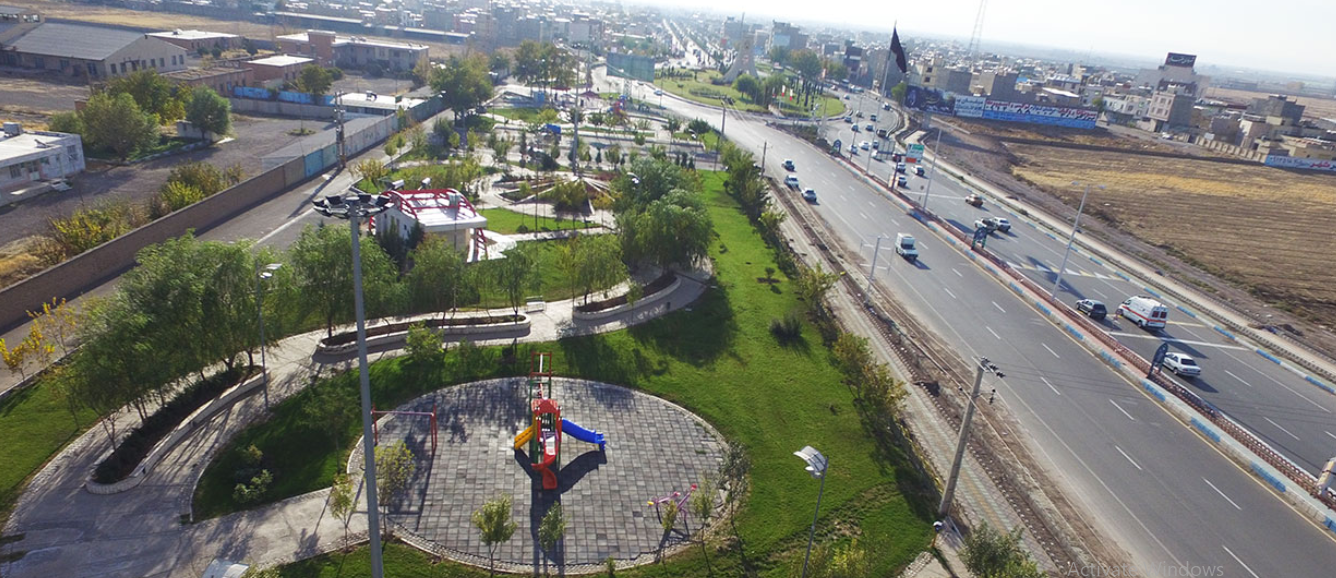

- Location within Iran
- Coordinates: 36°13′50″N 49°55′21″E
- Country: Iran
- Province: Qazvin
- County: Qazvin
- District: Central
- Established as a city: 1991

Population (2016)
  - Total: 55,066
- Time zone: UTC+3:30 (IRST)

Eqbaliyeh (Persian: اقباليه) (Note: Formerly known as Soltanabad-e Eqbaliyeh (سلطان آباد اقبالیه), also romanized as Solţānābād-e Eqbālīyeh; also known as Solţānābād or Sultanabad) is a city in the Central District of Qazvin County, Qazvin province, Iran. Eqbaliyeh is one of the old cities of Qazvin province and has an area of about 47.3 square kilometers. It is 5 kilometers southwest of Qazvin city, on the main road of this city to Hamedan and Zanjan. The village of Soltanabad was converted to the city of Eqbaliyeh in 1991.

== Demographics ==
=== Population ===
At the time of the 2006 National Census, the city's population was 49,230 in 12,082 households. The following census in 2011 counted 55,498 people in 15,403 households. The 2016 census measured the population of the city as 55,066 people in 16,154 households.

Most of the population of this city is made up of non-natives and immigrants who came to this area from different regions, including Lorestan, Zanjan, Hamadan, Gilan, and Kurdistan provinces. Another important part of the population of this city is made up of Afghan immigrants who have come to Iran at different times.

After the re-establishment of the Taliban regime in 2021, a new wave of Afghan immigrants began to enter Iran, and a significant part of these people settled in the central regions of Iran, including Qazvin province. Due to the population structure of Eqbaliyeh city, which is generally made up of farmers and workers, the arrival of immigrants caused various protests and gatherings of local people in this city.

The people of this city believed that despite the Afghan immigrants who are willing to work in manual jobs for very low wages, the wage rate has decreased. Therefore, in order to reduce production costs, employers prefer to hire Afghan immigrants who receive lower wages than Iranian workers. This issue has caused Iranian citizens to feel that Afghans have occupied their jobs.

On 6 October 2023 there are videos posted to social media depicting mob violence against Afghan refugees and chants urging their departure from Iran. Police arrested 19 reportedly for the incident.

== Teppe Eqbalieh ==
The hill of Eqbalieh is related to the post-Islamic historical periods and is located in Qazvin city, central part, Eqbalieh city, and this work was registered as one of the national works of Iran on 22 August 2004 with registration number 13249. Also, Vilayat Park is located next to this hill, which has become a recreation area for the residents of this city.
