= Soltanabad, Qazvin =

Soltanabad سلطان اباد
- Village
- Location within Iran
- Coordinates: 36°24′11″N 49°46′16″E
- Country: Iran
- Province: Qazvin
- County: Qazvin
- Bakhsh: Kuhin
- Rural District: Ilat-e Qaqazan-e Sharqi

Population (2006)
  - Total: 195
- Time zone: UTC+3:30 (IRST)
  - Summer (DST): UTC+4:30 (IRDT)

Soltanabad (Persian: سلطان اباد, also Romanized as Solţānābād and Sultanabad) is a village in Ilat-e Qaqazan-e Sharqi Rural District, Kuhin District, Qazvin County, Qazvin Province, Iran. At the 2006 census, its population was 195, in 46 families.
