= Soltanabad, Arzuiyeh =

Soltanabad سلطان اباد
- Village
- Location within Iran
- Coordinates: 28°24′12″N 56°13′20″E
- Country: Iran
- Province: Kerman
- County: Arzuiyeh
- Bakhsh: Central
- Rural District: Vakilabad

Population (2006)
  - Total: 2,067
- Time zone: UTC+3:30 (IRST)
  - Summer (DST): UTC+4:30 (IRDT)

Soltanabad (Persian: سلطان اباد, also Romanized as Solţānābād; also known as Ḩoseynābād and Sultānābād) is a village in Vakilabad Rural District, in the Central District of Arzuiyeh County, Kerman Province, Iran. At the 2006 census, its population was 2,067, in 468 families.
