= Soltanabad, Mashhad =

Soltanabad سلطان اباد
- Village
- Location within Iran
- Coordinates: 36°33′00″N 59°19′12″E
- Country: Iran
- Province: Razavi Khorasan
- County: Mashhad
- Bakhsh: Central
- Rural District: Miyan Velayat

Population (2006)
  - Total: 224
- Time zone: UTC+3:30 (IRST)
  - Summer (DST): UTC+4:30 (IRDT)

Soltanabad (Persian: سلطان اباد, also Romanized as Solţānābād; also known as Kalāteh-ye Soltānābad and Solţānābād-e Esmā‘īl) is a village in Miyan Velayat Rural District, in the Central District of Mashhad County, Razavi Khorasan Province, Iran. At the 2006 census, its population was 224, in 73 families.
