= Soltanabad, Markazi =

Village in Markazi province, Iran

Soltanabad Persian: سلطان اباد
- Village
- Location within Iran
- Coordinates: 35°22′22″N 50°36′48″E
- Country: Iran
- Province: Markazi
- County: Zarandiyeh
- District: Central
- Rural District: Rudshur

Population (2016)
  - Total: 169
- Time zone: UTC+3:30 (IRST)

Soltanabad (Persian: سلطان اباد) (Note: Also romanized as Solţānābād; also known as Solţān and Sultānābād) is a village in Rudshur Rural District of the Central District in Zarandiyeh County, Markazi province, Iran.

== Demographics ==
=== Population ===
At the time of the 2006 National Census, the village's population was 157 in 46 households. The following census in 2011 counted 121 people in 38 households. The 2016 census measured the population of the village as 169 people in 56 households.
