= Soltanabad, Hamadan =

Village in Hamadan province, Iran

Soltanabad Persian: سلطان اباد
- Village
- Location within Iran
- Coordinates: 35°28′37″N 48°53′03″E
- Country: Iran
- Province: Hamadan
- County: Razan
- District: Sardrud
- Rural District: Sardrud-e Sofla

Population (2016)
  - Total: 1,556
- Time zone: UTC+3:30 (IRST)

Soltanabad (Persian: سلطان اباد) (Note: Also romanized as Solţānābād; also known as Saţānābād and Sūltānābād) is a village in Sardrud-e Sofla Rural District of Sardrud District in Razan County, Hamadan province, Iran.

== Demographics ==
=== Population ===
At the time of the 2006 National Census, the village's population was 1,454 in 331 households. The following census in 2011 counted 1,675 people in 446 households. The 2016 census measured the population of the village as 1,556 people in 462 households, the most populous in its rural district.
