= Soltaneb =

Soltaneb سلطانب
- Village
- Location within Iran
- Coordinates: 31°35′08″N 54°00′51″E
- Country: Iran
- Province: Yazd
- County: Taft
- Bakhsh: Central
- Rural District: Pishkuh

Population (2006)
  - Total: 59
- Time zone: UTC+3:30 (IRST)
  - Summer (DST): UTC+4:30 (IRDT)

Soltaneb (Persian: سلطانب, also Romanized as Solţāneb; also known as Solţānābād and Sultānābād) is a village in Pishkuh Rural District, in the Central District of Taft County, Yazd Province, Iran. At the 2006 census, its population was 59, in 24 families.
