= Soltanabad, Kangavar =

Village in Kermanshah province, Iran

Soltanabad Persian: سلطان اباد
- Village
- Location within Iran
- Coordinates: 34°27′01″N 47°59′00″E
- Country: Iran
- Province: Kermanshah
- County: Kangavar
- District: Central
- Rural District: Kermajan

Population (2016)
  - Total: 633
- Time zone: UTC+3:30 (IRST)

Soltanabad (Persian: سلطان اباد) (Note: Also romanized as Solţānābād; also known as Sultānābād) is a village in Kermajan Rural District of the Central District of Kangavar County, Kermanshah province, Iran.

== Demographics ==
=== Population ===
At the time of the 2006 National Census, the village's population was 781 in 176 households. The following census in 2011 counted 749 people in 201 households. The 2016 census measured the population of the village as 633 people in 190 households. It was the most populous village in its rural district.
