= Golmakan Rural District =

Rural district in Razavi Khorasan province, Iran

Golmakan Rural District Persian: دهستان گلمكان
- Rural District
- Location within Iran
- Coordinates: 36°32′N 59°08′E
- Country: Iran
- Province: Razavi Khorasan
- County: Golbahar
- District: Golmakan
- Established: 1986
- Capital: Ahmadabad

Population (2016)
  - Total: 8,937
- Time zone: UTC+3:30 (IRST)

Golmakan Rural District (Persian: دهستان گلمكان) is in Golmakan District of Golbahar County, Razavi Khorasan province, Iran. Its capital is the village of Ahmadabad. The previous capital of the rural district was the village of Golmakan, now a city.

== Demographics ==
=== Population ===
At the time of the 2006 National Census, the rural district's population (as a part of the former Golbahar District in Chenaran County) was 22,816 in 5,960 households. There were 20,366 inhabitants in 5,874 households at the following census of 2011. The 2016 census measured the population of the rural district as 8,937 in 2,764 households. The most populous of its 44 villages was Esjil (now in Cheshmeh Sabz Rural District), with 1,533 people.

In 2020, the district was separated from the county in the establishment of Golbahar County, and the rural district was transferred to the new Golmakan District.

=== Other villages in the rural district ===
- Abqad
- Behabad
- Deh Now
- Eslamabad
- Eyshabad
- Gavterna
- Hashemabad
- Jam Ab
- Kheyrabad
- Khij
- Kushkan
- Mava
- Nowzad
- Ravang
- Salmanabad
- Sang-e Sefid

== Notable people ==
- Houshang Golmakani, author, film critic.
