= Golmakan District =

District in Razavi Khorasan province, Iran

Golmakan District Persian: بخش گلمکان
- District
- Location within Iran
- Coordinates: 36°28′N 59°07′E
- Country: Iran
- Province: Razavi Khorasan
- County: Golbahar
- Established: 2020
- Capital: Golmakan
- Time zone: UTC+3:30 (IRST)

Golmakan District (Persian: بخش گلمکان) is in Golbahar County, Razavi Khorasan province, Iran. Its capital is the city of Golmakan, whose population at the time of the 2016 National Census was 8,373 people in 2,861 households.

== History ==
In 2020, Golbahar District was separated from Chenaran County in the establishment of Golbahar County, which was divided into two districts of two rural districts each, with the city of Golbahar (Note: Formerly Golbahar New City Development Project) as its capital.

== Demographics ==
=== Administrative divisions ===
Golmakan District
Administrative Divisions
Cheshmeh Sabz RD
Golmakan RD
Golmakan (city)
RD = Rural District
