= Tomandar =

Village in Razavi Khorasan province, Iran

Tomandar Persian: تمندر
- Village
- Location within Iran
- Coordinates: 36°37′28″N 59°12′55″E
- Country: Iran
- Province: Razavi Khorasan
- County: Golbahar
- District: Central
- Rural District: Now Bahar

Population (2016)
  - Total: 22
- Time zone: UTC+3:30 (IRST)

Tomandar (Persian: تمندر) (Note: Also known as Tomandar-e Bālā) is a village in Now Bahar Rural District of the Central District in Golbahar County, Razavi Khorasan province, Iran.

== Demographics ==
=== Population ===
At the time of the 2006 National Census, the village's population was 31 in seven households, when it was in Bizaki Rural District of the former Golbahar District in Chenaran County. The following census in 2011 counted a population below the reporting threshold. The 2016 census measured the population of the village as 22 people in six households.

In 2020, the district was separated from the county in the establishment of Golbahar County. The rural district was transferred to the new Central District, and Tomandar was transferred to Now Bahar Rural District created in the same district.
