= Khanabad, Razavi Khorasan =

Village in Razavi Khorasan province, Iran

Khanabad Persian: خان اباد
- Village
- Location within Iran
- Coordinates: 36°38′36″N 59°16′12″E
- Country: Iran
- Province: Razavi Khorasan
- County: Golbahar
- District: Central
- Rural District: Now Bahar

Population (2016)
  - Total: 104
- Time zone: UTC+3:30 (IRST)

Khanabad (Persian: خان اباد) (Note: Also romanized as Khānābād) is a village in Now Bahar Rural District of the Central District in Golbahar County, Razavi Khorasan province, Iran.

== Demographics ==
=== Population ===
At the time of the 2006 National Census, the village's population was 85 in 20 households, when it was in Bizaki Rural District of the former Golbahar District in Chenaran County. The following census in 2011 counted 74 people in 23 households. The 2016 census measured the population of the village as 104 people in 29 households.

In 2020, the district was separated from the county in the establishment of Golbahar County. The rural district was transferred to the new Central District, and Khanabad was transferred to Now Bahar Rural District created in the same district.
