= Momenabad, Golbahar =

Village in Razavi Khorasan province, Iran

Momenabad Persian: مومن اباد
- Village
- Location within Iran
- Country: Iran
- Province: Razavi Khorasan
- County: Golbahar
- District: Central
- Rural District: Now Bahar

Population (2016)
  - Total: 93
- Time zone: UTC+3:30 (IRST)

Momenabad (Persian: مؤمن‌آباد) (Note: Also romanized as Momenābād and Mowmenābād) is a village in Now Bahar Rural District of the Central District in Golbahar County, Razavi Khorasan province, Iran.

== Demographics ==
=== Population ===
At the time of the 2006 National Census, the village's population was 38 in 11 households, when it was in Bizaki Rural District of the former Golbahar District in Chenaran County. The following census in 2011 counted 21 people in seven households. The 2016 census measured the population of the village as seven people in four households.

In 2020, the district was separated from the county in the establishment of Golbahar County. The rural district was transferred to the new Central District, and Momenabad was transferred to Now Bahar Rural District created in the same district.
