= Il Hesar =

Village in Razavi Khorasan province, Iran

Il Hesar Persian: ايل حصار
- Village
- Location within Iran
- Country: Iran
- Province: Razavi Khorasan
- County: Golbahar
- District: Central
- Rural District: Now Bahar

Population (2016)
  - Total: 11
- Time zone: UTC+3:30 (IRST)

Il Hesar (Persian: ايل حصار) (Note: Also romanized as Īl Ḩeşār) is a village in Now Bahar Rural District of the Central District in Golbahar County, Razavi Khorasan province, Iran.

== Demographics ==
=== Population ===
At the time of the 2006 National Census, the village's population was 33 in 10 households, when it was in Bizaki Rural District of the former Golbahar District in Chenaran County. The following census in 2011 counted 18 people in six households. The 2016 census measured the population of the village as 11 people in four households.

In 2020, the district was separated from the county in the establishment of Golbahar County. The rural district was transferred to the new Central District, and Il Hesar was transferred to Now Bahar Rural District created in the same district.
