= Mehdi Soltan =

Village in Razavi Khorasan province, Iran

Mehdi Soltan Persian: مهدئ سلطان
- Village
- Location within Iran
- Country: Iran
- Province: Razavi Khorasan
- County: Golbahar
- District: Central
- Rural District: Now Bahar

Population (2016)
  - Total: Below reporting threshold
- Time zone: UTC+3:30 (IRST)

Mehdi Soltan (Persian: مهدئ سلطان) (Note: Also romanized as Mehdī Solṭān; also known as Mehdīābād (مهدي اباد) and Shahr-e Kharāb) is a village in Now Bahar Rural District of the Central District in Golbahar County, Razavi Khorasan province, Iran.

== Demographics ==
=== Population ===
At the time of the 2006 National Census, the village's population was 13 in four households, when it was in Bizaki Rural District of the former Golbahar District in Chenaran County. The village did not appear in the following census of 2011. The 2016 census measured the population of the village as below the reporting threshold.

In 2020, the district was separated from the county in the establishment of Golbahar County. The rural district was transferred to the new Central District, and Mehdi Soltan was transferred to Now Bahar Rural District created in the same district.
