= Owtan =

Village in Razavi Khorasan province, Iran

Owtan Persian: اوتان
- Village
- Location within Iran
- Coordinates: 36°37′10″N 59°11′28″E
- Country: Iran
- Province: Razavi Khorasan
- County: Golbahar
- District: Central
- Rural District: Now Bahar

Population (2016)
  - Total: 54
- Time zone: UTC+3:30 (IRST)

Owtan (Persian: اوتان) (Note: Also romanized as Owţān and Ūţān; also known as Sharīfābād-e Ūţān) is a village in Now Bahar Rural District of the Central District in Golbahar County, Razavi Khorasan province, Iran.

== Demographics ==
=== Population ===
At the time of the 2006 National Census, the village's population was 51 in 12 households, when it was in Bizaki Rural District of the former Golbahar District in Chenaran County. The following census in 2011 counted 40 people in 11 households. The 2016 census measured the population of the village as 54 people in 19 households.

In 2020, the district was separated from the county in the establishment of Golbahar County. The rural district was transferred to the new Central District, and Owtan was transferred to Now Bahar Rural District created in the same district.
