= Kamalabad, Razavi Khorasan =

Village in Razavi Khorasan province, Iran

Kamalabad Persian: كمال اباد
- Village
- Location within Iran
- Coordinates: 36°38′54″N 59°13′33″E
- Country: Iran
- Province: Razavi Khorasan
- County: Golbahar
- District: Central
- Rural District: Now Bahar

Population (2016)
  - Total: 169
- Time zone: UTC+3:30 (IRST)

Kamalabad (Persian: كمال اباد) (Note: Also romanized as Kamālābād) is a village in Now Bahar Rural District of the Central District in Golbahar County, Razavi Khorasan province, Iran.

== Demographics ==
=== Population ===
At the time of the 2006 National Census, the village's population was 184 in 32 households, when it was in Bizaki Rural District of the former Golbahar District in Chenaran County. The following census in 2011 counted 176 people in 43 households. The 2016 census measured the population of the village as 169 people in 54 households.

In 2020, the district was separated from the county in the establishment of Golbahar County. The rural district was transferred to the new Central District, and Kamalabad was transferred to Now Bahar Rural District created in the same district.
