= Mohammadabad-e Baluch =

Village in Razavi Khorasan province, Iran

Mohammadabad-e Baluch Persian: محمدابادبلوچ
- Village
- Location within Iran
- Coordinates: 36°38′55″N 59°10′30″E
- Country: Iran
- Province: Razavi Khorasan
- County: Golbahar
- District: Central
- Rural District: Now Bahar

Population (2016)
  - Total: 91
- Time zone: UTC+3:30 (IRST)

Mohammadabad-e Baluch (Persian: محمدابادبلوچ) (Note: Also romanized as Moḩammadābād-e Balūch) is a village in Now Bahar Rural District of the Central District in Golbahar County, Razavi Khorasan province, Iran.

== Demographics ==
=== Population ===
At the time of the 2006 National Census, the village's population was 123 in 33 households, when it was in Bizaki Rural District of the former Golbahar District in Chenaran County. The following census in 2011 counted 77 people in 21 households. The 2016 census measured the population of the village as 91 people in 26 households.

In 2020, the district was separated from the county in the establishment of Golbahar County. The rural district was transferred to the new Central District, Mohammadabad-e Baluch was transferred to Now Bahar Rural District created in the same district.
