= Charmi, Razavi Khorasan =

Village in Razavi Khorasan province, Iran

Charmi Persian: چرمي
- Village
- Location within Iran
- Country: Iran
- Province: Razavi Khorasan
- County: Golbahar
- District: Central
- Rural District: Now Bahar

Population (2016)
  - Total: 11
- Time zone: UTC+3:30 (IRST)

Charmi (Persian: چرمي) (Note: Also romanized as Charmī) is a village in Now Bahar Rural District of the Central District in Golbahar County, Razavi Khorasan province, Iran.

== Demographics ==
=== Population ===
At the time of the 2006 National Census, the village's population was 19 in five households, when it was in Bizaki Rural District of the former Golbahar District in Chenaran County. The village did not appear in the following census of 2011. The 2016 census measured the population of the village as 11 people in four households.

In 2020, the district was separated from the county in the establishment of Golbahar County. The rural district was transferred to the new Central District, and Charmi was transferred to Now Bahar Rural District created in the same district.
