= Najmabad, Golbahar =

Village in Razavi Khorasan province, Iran

Najmabad Persian: نجم اباد
- Village
- Location within Iran
- Country: Iran
- Province: Razavi Khorasan
- County: Golbahar
- District: Central
- Rural District: Now Bahar

Population (2016)
  - Total: 76
- Time zone: UTC+3:30 (IRST)

Najmabad (Persian: نجم اباد) (Note: Also romanized as Najmābād) is a village in Now Bahar Rural District of the Central District in Golbahar County, Razavi Khorasan province, Iran.

== Demographics ==
=== Population ===
At the time of the 2006 National Census, the village's population was 46 in 12 households, when it was in Bizaki Rural District of the former Golbahar District in Chenaran County. The following census in 2011 counted 61 people in 21 households. The 2016 census measured the population of the village as 76 people in 23 households.

In 2020, the district was separated from the county in the establishment of Golbahar County. The rural district was transferred to the new Central District, and Najmabad was transferred to Now Bahar Rural District created in the same district.
