= Hasanabad-e Amelzadeh =

Village in Razavi Khorasan province, Iran

Hasanabad-e Amelzadeh Persian: حسن اباد عامل زاده
- Village
- Location within Iran
- Coordinates: 36°39′33″N 59°10′55″E
- Country: Iran
- Province: Razavi Khorasan
- County: Golbahar
- District: Central
- Rural District: Now Bahar

Population (2016)
  - Total: 102
- Time zone: UTC+3:30 (IRST)

Hasanabad-e Amelzadeh (Persian: حسن اباد عامل زاده) (Note: Also romanized as Ḩasanābād-e ʿĀmelzādeh) is a village in Now Bahar Rural District of the Central District in Golbahar County, Razavi Khorasan province, Iran.

== Demographics ==
=== Population ===
At the time of the 2006 National Census, the village's population was 127 in 37 households, when it was in Bizaki Rural District of the former Golbahar District in Chenaran County. The following census in 2011 counted 102 people in 30 households. The 2016 census measured the population of the village as 102 people in 34 households.

In 2020, the district was separated from the county in the establishment of Golbahar County. The rural district was transferred to the new Central District, and Hasanabad-e Amelzadeh was transferred to Now Bahar Rural District created in the same district.
