= Hoseyn Naju =

Village in Razavi Khorasan province, Iran

Hoseyn Naju Persian: حسين نجو
- Village
- Location within Iran
- Coordinates: 36°37′11″N 59°11′42″E
- Country: Iran
- Province: Razavi Khorasan
- County: Golbahar
- District: Central
- Rural District: Now Bahar

Population (2016)
  - Total: 41
- Time zone: UTC+3:30 (IRST)

Hoseyn Naju (Persian: حسين نجو) (Note: Also romanized as Ḩoseyn Najū; also known as Kalāteh-ye Ḩoseyn Najū and Nowrūzābād) is a village in Now Bahar Rural District of the Central District in Golbahar County, Razavi Khorasan province, Iran.

== Demographics ==
=== Population ===
At the time of the 2006 National Census, the village's population was 66 in 13 households, when it was in Bizaki Rural District of the former Golbahar District in Chenaran County. The following census in 2011 counted 57 people in 16 households. The 2016 census measured the population of the village as 41 people in 13 households.

In 2020, the district was separated from the county in the establishment of Golbahar County. The rural district was transferred to the new Central District, and Hoseyn Naju was transferred to Now Bahar Rural District created in the same district.
