= Kalateh-ye Sheykhha =

Village in Razavi Khorasan province, Iran

Kalateh-ye Sheykhha Persian: كلاته شيخها
- Village
- Location within Iran
- Coordinates: 36°36′11″N 59°11′50″E
- Country: Iran
- Province: Razavi Khorasan
- County: Golbahar
- District: Central
- Rural District: Now Bahar

Population (2016)
  - Total: 303
- Time zone: UTC+3:30 (IRST)

Kalateh-ye Sheykhha (Persian: كلاته شيخها) (Note: Also romanized as Kalāteh-ye Sheykhhā) is a village in Now Bahar Rural District of the Central District in Golbahar County, Razavi Khorasan province, Iran.

== Demographics ==
=== Population ===
At the time of the 2006 National Census, the village's population was 253 in 56 households, when it was in Bizaki Rural District of the former Golbahar District in Chenaran County. The following census in 2011 counted 269 people in 70 households. The 2016 census measured the population of the village as 303 people in 98 households.

In 2020, the district was separated from the county in the establishment of Golbahar County. The rural district was transferred to the new Central District, and Kalateh-ye Sheykhha was transferred to Now Bahar Rural District created in the same district.
