= Now Mehan =

Village in Razavi Khorasan province, Iran

Now Mehan Persian: نومهن
- Village
- Location within Iran
- Coordinates: 36°41′22″N 59°12′23″E
- Country: Iran
- Province: Razavi Khorasan
- County: Golbahar
- District: Central
- Rural District: Now Bahar

Population (2016)
  - Total: 216
- Time zone: UTC+3:30 (IRST)

Now Mehan (Persian: نومهن) (Note: Also romanized as Now Mahan) is a village in Now Bahar Rural District of the Central District in Golbahar County, Razavi Khorasan province, Iran.

== Demographics ==
=== Population ===
At the time of the 2006 National Census, the village's population was 265 in 63 households, when it was in Bizaki Rural District of the former Golbahar District in Chenaran County. The following census in 2011 counted 210 people in 54 households. The 2016 census measured the population of the village as 216 people in 64 households.

In 2020, the district was separated from the county in the establishment of Golbahar County. The rural district was transferred to the new Central District, and Now Mehan was transferred to Now Bahar Rural District created in the same district.
