= Dastgerd, Razavi Khorasan =

Village in Razavi Khorasan province, Iran

Dastgerd Persian: دستگرد
- Village
- Location within Iran
- Coordinates: 36°37′46″N 59°10′04″E
- Country: Iran
- Province: Razavi Khorasan
- County: Golbahar
- District: Central
- Rural District: Now Bahar

Population (2016)
  - Total: 327
- Time zone: UTC+3:30 (IRST)

Dastgerd (Persian: دستگرد) (Note: Also known as Dastjerd) is a village in Now Bahar Rural District of the Central District in Golbahar County, Razavi Khorasan province, Iran.

== Demographics ==
=== Population ===
At the time of the 2006 National Census, the village's population was 307 in 65 households, when it was in Bizaki Rural District of the former Golbahar District in Chenaran County. The following census in 2011 counted 318 people in 82 households. The 2016 census measured the population of the village as 327 people in 98 households.

In 2020, the district was separated from the county in the establishment of Golbahar County. The rural district was transferred to the new Central District, and Dastgerd was transferred to Now Bahar Rural District created in the same district.

== Notable people ==
- Nader Shah - former Shah of Iran (Persia) who ruled in Persia from 1736 to 1747, was born here.
