= Sar Asiab, Golbahar =

Village in Razavi Khorasan province, Iran

Sar Asiab Persian: سراسياب
- Village
- Location within Iran
- Coordinates: 36°38′30″N 59°12′36″E
- Country: Iran
- Province: Razavi Khorasan
- County: Golbahar
- District: Central
- Rural District: Now Bahar

Population (2016)
  - Total: 949
- Time zone: UTC+3:30 (IRST)

Sar Asiab (Persian: سراسياب) (Note: Also romanized as Sar Āsīāb) is a village in Now Bahar Rural District of the Central District in Golbahar County, Razavi Khorasan province, Iran.

== Demographics ==
=== Population ===
At the time of the 2006 National Census, the village's population was 775 in 180 households, when it was in Bizaki Rural District of the former Golbahar District in Chenaran County. The following census in 2011 counted 748 people in 203 households. The 2016 census measured the population of the village as 949 people in 277 households.

In 2020, the district was separated from the county in the establishment of Golbahar County. The rural district was transferred to the new Central District, and Sar Asiab was transferred to Now Bahar Rural District created in the same district.
