= Taherabad, Golbahar =

Village in Razavi Khorasan province, Iran

Taherabad Persian: طاهراباد
- Village
- Location within Iran
- Country: Iran
- Province: Razavi Khorasan
- County: Golbahar
- District: Central
- Rural District: Now Bahar

Population (2016)
  - Total: Below reporting threshold
- Time zone: UTC+3:30 (IRST)

Taherabad (Persian: طاهراباد) (Note: Also romanized as Ţāherābād) is a village in Now Bahar Rural District of the Central District in Golbahar County, Razavi Khorasan province, Iran.

== Demographics ==
=== Population ===
At the time of the 2006 National Census, the village's population was 24 in five households, when it was in Bizaki Rural District of the former Golbahar District in Chenaran County. The following censuses in 2011 and 2016 counted a population below the reporting threshold.

In 2020, the district was separated from the county in the establishment of Golbahar County. The rural district was transferred to the new Central District, and Taherabad was transferred to Now Bahar Rural District created in the same district.
