= Zanaqol =

Village in Razavi Khorasan province, Iran

Zanaqol Persian: زناقل
- Village
- Location within Iran
- Coordinates: 36°38′59″N 59°09′29″E
- Country: Iran
- Province: Razavi Khorasan
- County: Golbahar
- District: Central
- Rural District: Now Bahar

Population (2016)
  - Total: 182
- Time zone: UTC+3:30 (IRST)

Zanaqol (Persian: زناقل) (Note: Also romanized as Zanāqol; also known as Zanā QolĪ) is a village in Now Bahar Rural District of the Central District in Golbahar County, Razavi Khorasan province, Iran.

== Demographics ==
=== Population ===
At the time of the 2006 National Census, the village's population was 189 in 51 households, when it was in Bizaki Rural District of the former Golbahar District in Chenaran County. The following census in 2011 counted 167 people in 50 households. The 2016 census measured the population of the village as 182 people in 59 households.

In 2020, the district was separated from the county in the establishment of Golbahar County. The rural district was transferred to the new Central District, and Zanaqol was transferred to Now Bahar Rural District created in the same district.
