= Hiteh Tala =

Village in Razavi Khorasan province, Iran

Hiteh Tala Persian: حيطه طلا
- Village
- Location within Iran
- Coordinates: 36°40′12″N 59°10′25″E
- Country: Iran
- Province: Razavi Khorasan
- County: Golbahar
- District: Central
- Rural District: Now Bahar

Population (2016)
  - Total: 213
- Time zone: UTC+3:30 (IRST)

Hiteh Tala (Persian: حيطه طلا) (Note: Also romanized as Ḩīţeh Ţalā; also known as Ḩebţeh Ţalā) is a village in Now Bahar Rural District of the Central District in Golbahar County, Razavi Khorasan province, Iran.

== Demographics ==
=== Population ===
At the time of the 2006 National Census, the village's population was 228 in 66 households, when it was in Bizaki Rural District of the former Golbahar District in Chenaran County. The following census in 2011 counted 234 people in 79 households. The 2016 census measured the population of the village as 213 people in 77 households.

In 2020, the district was separated from the county in the establishment of Golbahar County. The rural district was transferred to the new Central District, and Hiteh Tala was transferred to Now Bahar Rural District created in the same district.
