= Shelangerd =

Village in Razavi Khorasan province, Iran

Shelangerd Persian: شلنگرد
- Village
- Location within Iran
- Coordinates: 36°36′32″N 59°15′25″E
- Country: Iran
- Province: Razavi Khorasan
- County: Golbahar
- District: Central
- Rural District: Bizaki

Population (2016)
  - Total: 230
- Time zone: UTC+3:30 (IRST)

Shelangerd (Persian: شلنگرد) is a village in, and the capital of, Bizaki Rural District in the Central District of Golbahar County, Razavi Khorasan province, Iran. The previous capital of the rural district was the village of Mohsenabad.

== Demographics ==
=== Population ===
At the time of the 2006 National Census, the village's population was 168 in 44 households, when it was in the former Golbahar District of Chenaran County. The following census in 2011 counted 186 people in 61 households. The 2016 census measured the population of the village as 230 people in 66 households.

In 2020, the district was separated from the county in the establishment of Golbahar County, and the rural district was transferred to the new Central District.
