= Guri, Golbahar =

Village in Razavi Khorasan province, Iran

Guri Persian: گوري
- Village
- Location within Iran
- Coordinates: 36°45′13″N 59°21′14″E
- Country: Iran
- Province: Razavi Khorasan
- County: Golbahar
- District: Central
- Rural District: Bizaki

Population (2016)
  - Total: 55
- Time zone: UTC+3:30 (IRST)

Guri (Persian: گوري) (Note: Also romanized as Gūrī; also known as Gorūh) is a village in Bizaki Rural District of the Central District in Golbahar County, Razavi Khorasan province, Iran.

== Demographics ==
=== Population ===
At the time of the 2006 National Census, the village's population was 63 in 17 households, when it was in the former Golbahar District of Chenaran County. The following census in 2011 counted 63 people in 19 households. The 2016 census measured the population of the village as 55 people in 19 households.

In 2020, the district was separated from the county in the establishment of Golbahar County, and the rural district was transferred to the new Central District.
