= Fallahabad, Razavi Khorasan =

Village in Razavi Khorasan province, Iran

Fallahabad Persian: فلاح اباد
- Village
- Location within Iran
- Country: Iran
- Province: Razavi Khorasan
- County: Golbahar
- District: Central
- Rural District: Bizaki

Population (2016)
  - Total: Below reporting threshold
- Time zone: UTC+3:30 (IRST)

Fallahabad (Persian: فلاح اباد) (Note: Also romanized as Fallāḩābād; also known as Fallāḩābād-e Jow Pā’īn) is a village in Bizaki Rural District of the Central District in Golbahar County, Razavi Khorasan province, Iran.

== Demographics ==
=== Population ===
At the time of the 2006 National Census, the village's population was 31 in seven households, when it was in the former Golbahar District of Chenaran County. The following census in 2011 counted 27 people in five households. The 2016 census measured the population of the village as below the reporting threshold.

In 2020, the district was separated from the county in the establishment of Golbahar County, and the rural district was transferred to the new Central District.
