= Darangun =

Village in Razavi Khorasan province, Iran

Darangun Persian: درنگون
- Village
- Location within Iran
- Coordinates: 36°37′18″N 59°15′35″E
- Country: Iran
- Province: Razavi Khorasan
- County: Golbahar
- District: Central
- Rural District: Bizaki

Population (2016)
  - Total: 7
- Time zone: UTC+3:30 (IRST)

Darangun (Persian: درنگون) (Note: Also romanized as Darangūn; also known as Daralgān, Darangān, and Dorangān) is a village in Bizaki Rural District of the Central District in Golbahar County, Razavi Khorasan province, Iran.

== Demographics ==
=== Population ===
At the time of the 2006 National Census, the village's population was 31 in 12 households, when it was in the former Golbahar District of Chenaran County. The following census in 2011 counted a population below the reporting threshold. The 2016 census measured the population of the village as seven people in four households.

In 2020, the district was separated from the county in the establishment of Golbahar County, and the rural district was transferred to the new Central District.
