= Pas Poshteh, Razavi Khorasan =

Village in Razavi Khorasan province, Iran

Pas Poshteh Persian: پس پشته
- Village
- Location within Iran
- Coordinates: 36°42′31″N 59°22′27″E
- Country: Iran
- Province: Razavi Khorasan
- County: Golbahar
- District: Central
- Rural District: Bizaki

Population (2016)
  - Total: 346
- Time zone: UTC+3:30 (IRST)

Pas Poshteh (Persian: پس پشته) (Note: Also known as Pa yi Pusht, Pas Poshteh Barvānlū, and Pāy Poshteh) is a village in Bizaki Rural District of the Central District in Golbahar County, Razavi Khorasan province, Iran.

== Demographics ==
=== Population ===
At the time of the 2006 National Census, the village's population was 506 in 126 households, when it was in the former Golbahar District of Chenaran County. The following census in 2011 counted 301 people in 84 households. The 2016 census measured the population of the village as 346 people in 96 households.

In 2020, the district was separated from the county in the establishment of Golbahar County, and the rural district was transferred to the new Central District.
