= Pishavak =

Village in Razavi Khorasan province, Iran

Pishavak Persian: پيشاوك
- Village
- Location within Iran
- Coordinates: 36°38′28″N 59°22′22″E
- Country: Iran
- Province: Razavi Khorasan
- County: Golbahar
- District: Central
- Rural District: Bizaki

Population (2016)
  - Total: 19
- Time zone: UTC+3:30 (IRST)

Pishavak (Persian: پيشاوك) (Note: Also romanized as Pīshāvak and Pīshāvok; also known as Pashāvak) is a village in Bizaki Rural District of the Central District in Golbahar County, Razavi Khorasan province, Iran.

== Demographics ==
=== Population ===
At the time of the 2006 National Census, the village's population was 35 in 10 households, when it was in the former Golbahar District of Chenaran County. The following census in 2011 counted 17 people in six households. The 2016 census measured the population of the village as 19 people in six households.

In 2020, the district was separated from the county in the establishment of Golbahar County, and the rural district was transferred to the new Central District.
