= Fathabad, Golbahar =

Village in Razavi Khorasan province, Iran

Fathabad Persian: فتح اباد
- Village
- Location within Iran
- Coordinates: 36°34′51″N 59°15′09″E
- Country: Iran
- Province: Razavi Khorasan
- County: Golbahar
- District: Central
- Rural District: Bizaki

Population (2016)
  - Total: 77
- Time zone: UTC+3:30 (IRST)

Fathabad (Persian: فتح اباد) (Note: Also romanized as Fatḩābād) is a village in Bizaki Rural District of the Central District in Golbahar County, Razavi Khorasan province, Iran.

== Demographics ==
=== Population ===
At the time of the 2006 National Census, the village's population was 166 in 43 households, when it was in the former Golbahar District of Chenaran County. The following census in 2011 counted 110 people in 31 households. The 2016 census measured the population of the village as 77 people in 22 households.

In 2020, the district was separated from the county in the establishment of Golbahar County, and the rural district was transferred to the new Central District.
