= Hajj Esmail =

Village in Razavi Khorasan province, Iran

Hajj Esmail Persian: حاج اسماعيل
- Village
- Location within Iran
- Coordinates: 36°38′31″N 59°14′28″E
- Country: Iran
- Province: Razavi Khorasan
- County: Golbahar
- District: Central
- Rural District: Now Bahar

Population (2016)
  - Total: 47
- Time zone: UTC+3:30 (IRST)

Hajj Esmail (Persian: حاج اسماعيل) (Note: Also romanized as Ḩājj Esmāe‘īl and Hajj Esmaeil; also known as Ḩājjī Esmāe‘īl (حاجي اسماعيل) and Kalāteh-ye Ḩājjī Esmā‘īl) is a village in Now Bahar Rural District of the Central District in Golbahar County, Razavi Khorasan province, Iran.

== Demographics ==
=== Population ===
At the time of the 2006 National Census, the village's population was 52 in 11 households, when it was in Bizaki Rural District of the former Golbahar District in Chenaran County. The following census in 2011 counted 35 people in 10 households. The 2016 census measured the population of the village as 47 people in 14 households.

In 2020, the district was separated from the county in the establishment of Golbahar County. The rural district was transferred to the new Central District, and Hajj Esmail was transferred to Now Bahar Rural District created in the same district.
