= Tavil, Golbahar =

Village in Razavi Khorasan province, Iran

Tavil Persian: طويل
- Village
- Location within Iran
- Coordinates: 36°43′46″N 59°23′02″E
- Country: Iran
- Province: Razavi Khorasan
- County: Golbahar
- District: Central
- Rural District: Bizaki

Population (2016)
  - Total: 335
- Time zone: UTC+3:30 (IRST)

Tavil (Persian: طويل) (Note: Also romanized as Ţavīl) is a village in Bizaki Rural District of the Central District in Golbahar County, Razavi Khorasan province, Iran.

== Demographics ==
=== Population ===
At the time of the 2006 National Census, the village's population was 333 in 71 households, when it was in the former Golbahar District of Chenaran County. The following census in 2011 counted 266 people in 75 households. The 2016 census measured the population of the village as 335 people in 95 households.

In 2020, the district was separated from the county in the establishment of Golbahar County, and the rural district was transferred to the new Central District.
