= Hakimabad, Golbahar =

Village in Razavi Khorasan province, Iran

Hakimabad Persian: حكيم اباد
- Village
- Location within Iran
- Country: Iran
- Province: Razavi Khorasan
- County: Golbahar
- District: Central
- Rural District: Bizaki

Population (2016)
  - Total: 27
- Time zone: UTC+3:30 (IRST)

Hakimabad (Persian: حكيم اباد) (Note: Also romanized as Ḩakīmābād) is a village in Bizaki Rural District of the Central District in Golbahar County, Razavi Khorasan province, Iran.

== Demographics ==
=== Population ===
At the time of the 2006 National Census, the village's population was 43 in 14 households, when it was in the former Golbahar District of Chenaran County. The following census in 2011 counted 43 people in 11 households. The 2016 census measured the population of the village as 27 people in eight households.

In 2020, the district was separated from the county in the establishment of Golbahar County, and the rural district was transferred to the new Central District.
