= Kalateh-ye Qanbar Ali =

Village in Razavi Khorasan province, Iran

Kalateh-ye Qanbar Ali Persian: كلاته قنبرعلي
- Village
- Location within Iran
- Country: Iran
- Province: Razavi Khorasan
- County: Golbahar
- District: Central
- Rural District: Bizaki

Population (2016)
  - Total: 16
- Time zone: UTC+3:30 (IRST)

Kalateh-ye Qanbar Ali (Persian: كلاته قنبرعلي) (Note: Also romanized as Kalāteh-ye Qanbar ‘Alī) is a village in Bizaki Rural District of the Central District in Golbahar County, Razavi Khorasan province, Iran.

== Demographics ==
=== Population ===
At the time of the 2006 National Census, the village's population was 32 in seven households, when it was in the former Golbahar District of Chenaran County. The following census in 2011 counted nine people in four households. The 2016 census measured the population of the village as 16 people in five households.

In 2020, the district was separated from the county in the establishment of Golbahar County, and the rural district was transferred to the new Central District.
