= Cheshmeh Gilas =

Village in Razavi Khorasan province, Iran

Cheshmeh Gilas Persian: چشمه گيلاس
- Village
- Location within Iran
- Coordinates: 36°36′38″N 59°20′25″E
- Country: Iran
- Province: Razavi Khorasan
- County: Golbahar
- District: Central
- Rural District: Bizaki

Population (2016)
  - Total: 136
- Time zone: UTC+3:30 (IRST)

Cheshmeh Gilas (Persian: چشمه گيلاس) (Note: Also romanized as Cheshmeh Gīlās; also known as Chashmeh Gīlāg) is a village in Bizaki Rural District of the Central District in Golbahar County, Razavi Khorasan province, Iran.

== Demographics ==
=== Population ===
At the time of the 2006 National Census, the village's population was 188 in 51 households, when it was in the former Golbahar District of Chenaran County. The following census in 2011 counted 129 people in 35 households. The 2016 census measured the population of the village as 136 people in 44 households.

In 2020, the district was separated from the county in the establishment of Golbahar County, and the rural district was transferred to the new Central District.
