= Kalateh-ye Shirin =

Village in Razavi Khorasan province, Iran

Kalateh-ye Shirin Persian: كلاته شيرين
- Village
- Location within Iran
- Coordinates: 36°41′26″N 59°18′59″E
- Country: Iran
- Province: Razavi Khorasan
- County: Golbahar
- District: Central
- Rural District: Bizaki

Population (2016)
  - Total: 106
- Time zone: UTC+3:30 (IRST)

Kalateh-ye Shirin (Persian: كلاته شيرين) (Note: Also romanized as Kalateh Shirin, Kalāteh Shīrīn, and Kalāteh-ye Shīrīn) is a village in Bizaki Rural District of the Central District in Golbahar County, Razavi Khorasan province, Iran.

== Demographics ==
=== Population ===
At the time of the 2006 National Census, the village's population was 116 in 32 households, when it was in the former Golbahar District of Chenaran County. The following census in 2011 counted 100 people in 32 households. The 2016 census measured the population of the village as 106 people in 34 households.

In 2020, the district was separated from the county in the establishment of Golbahar County, and the rural district was transferred to the new Central District.
