= Derakht-e Senjed, Golbahar =

Village in Razavi Khorasan province, Iran

Derakht-e Senjed Persian: درخت سنجد
- Village
- Location within Iran
- Coordinates: 36°37′54″N 59°14′49″E
- Country: Iran
- Province: Razavi Khorasan
- County: Golbahar
- District: Central
- Rural District: Now Bahar

Population (2016)
  - Total: 42
- Time zone: UTC+3:30 (IRST)

Derakht-e Senjed (Persian: درخت سنجد) is a village in Now Bahar Rural District of the Central District in Golbahar County, Razavi Khorasan province, Iran.

== Demographics ==
=== Population ===
At the time of the 2006 National Census, the village's population was 44 in 11 households, when it was in Bizaki Rural District of the former Golbahar District in Chenaran County. The following census in 2011 counted 31 people in nine households. The 2016 census measured the population of the village as 42 people in 14 households.

In 2020, the district was separated from the county in the establishment of Golbahar County. The rural district was transferred to the new Central District, and Derakht-e Senjed was transferred to Now Bahar Rural District created in the same district.
