= Karangan, Razavi Khorasan =

Village in Razavi Khorasan province, Iran

Karangan Persian: كرنگان
- Village
- Location within Iran
- Coordinates: 36°39′59″N 59°09′27″E
- Country: Iran
- Province: Razavi Khorasan
- County: Golbahar
- District: Central
- Rural District: Now Bahar

Population (2016)
  - Total: 235
- Time zone: UTC+3:30 (IRST)

Karangan (Persian: كرنگان) (Note: Also romanized as Karangān; also known as Garīgān and Keremgān) is a village in Now Bahar Rural District of the Central District in Golbahar County, Razavi Khorasan province, Iran.

== Demographics ==
=== Population ===
At the time of the 2006 National Census, the village's population was 274 in 68 households, when it was in Bizaki Rural District of the former Golbahar District in Chenaran County. The following census in 2011 counted 257 people in 74 households. The 2016 census measured the population of the village as 235 people in 72 households.

In 2020, the district was separated from the county in the establishment of Golbahar County. The rural district was transferred to the new Central District, and Karangan was transferred to Now Bahar Rural District created in the same district.
