= Now Bahar, Golbahar =

Village in Razavi Khorasan province, Iran

Now Bahar Persian: نوبهار
- Village
- Location within Iran
- Coordinates: 36°35′21″N 59°13′08″E
- Country: Iran
- Province: Razavi Khorasan
- County: Golbahar
- District: Central
- Rural District: Now Bahar

Population (2016)
  - Total: 2,367
- Time zone: UTC+3:30 (IRST)

Now Bahar (Persian: نوبهار) (Note: Also romanized as Now Bahār) is a village in, and the capital of, Now Bahar Rural District in the Central District of Golbahar County, Razavi Khorasan province, Iran.

== Demographics ==
=== Population ===
At the time of the 2006 National Census, the village's population was 1,147 in 269 households, when it was in Bizaki Rural District of the former Golbahar District in Chenaran County. The following census in 2011 counted 1,343 people in 372 households. The 2016 census measured the population of the village as 2,367 people in 698 households, the most populous in its rural district.

In 2020, the district was separated from the county in the establishment of Golbahar County. The rural district was transferred to the new Central District, and Now Bahar was transferred to Now Bahar Rural District created in the same district.
