= Shah Galdi, Razavi Khorasan =

Village in Razavi Khorasan province, Iran

Shah Galdi Persian: شاه گلدي
- Village
- Location within Iran
- Country: Iran
- Province: Razavi Khorasan
- County: Golbahar
- District: Central
- Rural District: Bizaki

Population (2016)
  - Total: 15
- Time zone: UTC+3:30 (IRST)

Shah Galdi (Persian: شاه گلدي) (Note: Also romanized as Shāh Galdī) is a village in Bizaki Rural District of the Central District in Golbahar County, Razavi Khorasan province, Iran.

== Demographics ==
=== Population ===
At the time of the 2006 National Census, the village's population was 15 in four households, when it was in the former Golbahar District of Chenaran County. The following census in 2011 counted 16 people in five households. The 2016 census measured the population of the village as 15 people in four households.

In 2020, the district was separated from the county in the establishment of Golbahar County, and the rural district was transferred to the new Central District.
