= Mehrabad, Golbahar =

Village in Razavi Khorasan province, Iran

Mehrabad Persian: مهراباد
- Village
- Location within Iran
- Coordinates: 36°35′19″N 59°18′29″E
- Country: Iran
- Province: Razavi Khorasan
- County: Golbahar
- District: Central
- Rural District: Bizaki

Population (2016)
  - Total: 67
- Time zone: UTC+3:30 (IRST)

Mehrabad (Persian: مهراباد) (Note: Also romanized as Mehrābād) is a village in Bizaki Rural District of the Central District in Golbahar County, Razavi Khorasan province, Iran.

== Demographics ==
=== Population ===
At the time of the 2006 National Census, the village's population was 92 in 26 households, when it was in the former Golbahar District of Chenaran County. The following census in 2011 counted 78 people in 21 households. The 2016 census measured the population of the village as 67 people in 21 households.

In 2020, the district was separated from the county in the establishment of Golbahar County, and the rural district was transferred to the new Central District.
