= Shurak, Razavi Khorasan =

Village in Razavi Khorasan province, Iran

Shurak Persian: شورك
- Village
- Location within Iran
- Coordinates: 36°43′34″N 59°17′32″E
- Country: Iran
- Province: Razavi Khorasan
- County: Golbahar
- District: Central
- Rural District: Bizaki

Population (2016)
  - Total: 45
- Time zone: UTC+3:30 (IRST)

Shurak (Persian: شورك) (Note: Also romanized as Shūrak; also known as Shūrvak) is a village in Bizaki Rural District of the Central District in Golbahar County, Razavi Khorasan province, Iran.

== Demographics ==
=== Population ===
At the time of the 2006 National Census, the village's population was 34 in eight households, when it was in the former Golbahar District of Chenaran County. The following census in 2011 counted 17 people in four households. The 2016 census measured the population of the village as 45 people in 12 households.

In 2020, the district was separated from the county in the establishment of Golbahar County, and the rural district was transferred to the new Central District.
