= Kalateh-ye Tolaki =

Village in Razavi Khorasan province, Iran

Kalateh-ye Tolaki Persian: كلاته تلكي
- Village
- Location within Iran
- Coordinates: 36°36′18″N 59°17′34″E
- Country: Iran
- Province: Razavi Khorasan
- County: Golbahar
- District: Central
- Rural District: Bizaki

Population (2016)
  - Total: 64
- Time zone: UTC+3:30 (IRST)

Kalateh-ye Tolaki (Persian: كلاته تلكي) (Note: Also romanized as Kalāteh-ye Tolakī) is a village in Bizaki Rural District of the Central District in Golbahar County, Razavi Khorasan province, Iran.

== Demographics ==
=== Population ===
At the time of the 2006 National Census, the village's population was 112 in 24 households, when it was in the former Golbahar District of Chenaran County. The following census in 2011 counted 54 people in 16 households. The 2016 census measured the population of the village as 64 people in 22 households.

In 2020, the district was separated from the county in the establishment of Golbahar County, and the rural district was transferred to the new Central District.
