= Zohab, Golbahar =

Village in Razavi Khorasan province, Iran

Zohab Persian: ذهاب
- Village
- Location within Iran
- Coordinates: 36°38′00″N 59°12′14″E
- Country: Iran
- Province: Razavi Khorasan
- County: Golbahar
- District: Central
- Rural District: Now Bahar

Population (2016)
  - Total: 36
- Time zone: UTC+3:30 (IRST)

Zohab (Persian: ذهاب) (Note: Also romanized as Zohāb; also known as Qal‘eh Zohāb) is a village in Now Bahar Rural District of the Central District in Golbahar County, Razavi Khorasan province, Iran.

== Demographics ==
=== Population ===
At the time of the 2006 National Census, the village's population was 45 in 10 households, when it was in Bizaki Rural District of the former Golbahar District in Chenaran County. The following census in 2011 counted 32 people in eight households. The 2016 census measured the population of the village as 36 people in 10 households.

In 2020, the district was separated from the county in the establishment of Golbahar County. The rural district was transferred to the new Central District, and Zohab was transferred to Now Bahar Rural District created in the same district.
