= Qashqabad =

Village in Razavi Khorasan province, Iran

Qashqabad Persian: قشق اباد
- Village
- Location within Iran
- Coordinates: 36°36′15″N 59°12′22″E
- Country: Iran
- Province: Razavi Khorasan
- County: Golbahar
- District: Central
- Rural District: Bizaki

Population (2016)
  - Total: 365
- Time zone: UTC+3:30 (IRST)

Qashqabad (Persian: قشق اباد) (Note: Also romanized as Qashqābād; also known as ‘Eshqābād) is a village in Bizaki Rural District of the Central District in Golbahar County, Razavi Khorasan province, Iran.

== Demographics ==
=== Population ===
At the time of the 2006 National Census, the village's population was 350 in 80 households when it was in the former Golbahar District of Chenaran County. The following census in 2011 counted 348 people in 96 households. The 2016 census measured the population of the village as 365 people in 117 households.

In 2020, the district was separated from the county in the establishment of Golbahar County, and the rural district was transferred to the new Central District.
