= Shirin, Razavi Khorasan =

Village in Razavi Khorasan province, Iran

Shirin Persian: شيرين
- Village
- Location within Iran
- Coordinates: 36°42′53″N 59°19′50″E
- Country: Iran
- Province: Razavi Khorasan
- County: Golbahar
- District: Central
- Rural District: Bizaki

Population (2016)
  - Total: 152
- Time zone: UTC+3:30 (IRST)

Shirin (Persian: شيرين) (Note: Also romanized as Shīrīn) is a village in Bizaki Rural District of the Central District in Golbahar County, Razavi Khorasan province, Iran.

== Demographics ==
=== Population ===
At the time of the 2006 National Census, the village's population was 168 in 44 households, when it was in the former Golbahar District of Chenaran County. The following census in 2011 counted 103 people in 31 households. The 2016 census measured the population of the village as 152 people in 45 households.

In 2020, the district was separated from the county in the establishment of Golbahar County, and the rural district was transferred to the new Central District.
