= Dulkhan =

Village in Razavi Khorasan province, Iran

Dulkhan Persian: دولخان
- Village
- Location within Iran
- Coordinates: 36°35′07″N 59°17′55″E
- Country: Iran
- Province: Razavi Khorasan
- County: Golbahar
- District: Central
- Rural District: Bizaki

Population (2016)
  - Total: 137
- Time zone: UTC+3:30 (IRST)

Dulkhan (Persian: دولخان) (Note: Also romanized as Dūlkhān) is a village in Bizaki Rural District of the Central District in Golbahar County, Razavi Khorasan province, Iran.

== Demographics ==
=== Population ===
At the time of the 2006 National Census, the village's population was 110 in 28 households, when it was in the former Golbahar District of Chenaran County. The following census in 2011 counted 104 people in 30 households. The 2016 census measured the population of the village as 137 people in 44 households.

In 2020, the district was separated from the county in the establishment of Golbahar County, and the rural district was transferred to the new Central District.
