= Pushan, Iran =

Village in Razavi Khorasan province, Iran

Pushan Persian: پوشان
- Village
- Location within Iran
- Coordinates: 36°44′22″N 59°22′22″E
- Country: Iran
- Province: Razavi Khorasan
- County: Golbahar
- District: Central
- Rural District: Bizaki

Population (2016)
  - Total: 386
- Time zone: UTC+3:30 (IRST)

Pushan (Persian: پوشان) (Note: Also romanized as Pūshān; also known as Fūshān) is a village in Bizaki Rural District of the Central District in Golbahar County, Razavi Khorasan province, Iran.

== Demographics ==
=== Population ===
At the time of the 2006 National Census, the village's population was 505 in 127 households, when it was in the former Golbahar District of Chenaran County. The following census in 2011 counted 410 people in 116 households. The 2016 census measured the population of the village as 386 people in 120 households.

In 2020, the district was separated from the county in the establishment of Golbahar County, and the rural district was transferred to the new Central District.
