= Hasanabad-e Manqeshli =

Village in Razavi Khorasan province, Iran

Hasanabad-e Manqeshli Persian: حسن ابادمنقشلي
- Village
- Location within Iran
- Coordinates: 36°38′01″N 59°16′58″E
- Country: Iran
- Province: Razavi Khorasan
- County: Golbahar
- District: Central
- Rural District: Bizaki

Population (2016)
  - Total: 34
- Time zone: UTC+3:30 (IRST)

Hasanabad-e Manqeshli (Persian: حسن ابادمنقشلي) (Note: Also romanized as Hasanabad-e Manqashali, Ḩasanābād-e Manqashalī, and Ḩasanābād-e Manqeshlī; also known as Ḩasanābād-e Manqasalī) is a village in Bizaki Rural District of the Central District in Golbahar County, Razavi Khorasan province, Iran.

== Demographics ==
=== Population ===
At the time of the 2006 National Census, the village's population was 34 in 10 households, when it was in the former Golbahar District of Chenaran County. The following census in 2011 counted 28 people in seven households. The 2016 census measured the population of the village as 34 people in nine households.

In 2020, the district was separated from the county in the establishment of Golbahar County, and the rural district was transferred to the new Central District.
