= Qarah Jangal =

Village in Razavi Khorasan province, Iran

Qarah Jangal Persian: قره جنگل
- Village
- Location within Iran
- Coordinates: 36°35′16″N 59°19′58″E
- Country: Iran
- Province: Razavi Khorasan
- County: Golbahar
- District: Central
- Rural District: Bizaki

Population (2016)
  - Total: 486
- Time zone: UTC+3:30 (IRST)

Qarah Jangal (Persian: قره جنگل) (Note: Also romanized as Qareh Jangal; also known as Qareh Jagal) is a village in Bizaki Rural District of the Central District in Golbahar County, Razavi Khorasan province, Iran.

== Demographics ==
=== Population ===
At the time of the 2006 National Census, the village's population was 480 in 118 households, when it was in the former Golbahar District of Chenaran County. The following census in 2011 counted 459 people in 132 households. The 2016 census measured the population of the village as 486 people in 142 households.

In 2020, the district was separated from the county in the establishment of Golbahar County, and the rural district was transferred to the new Central District.
