= Chamleh, Razavi Khorasan =

Village in Razavi Khorasan province, Iran

Chamleh Persian: چمله
- Village
- Location within Iran
- Coordinates: 36°36′37″N 59°17′46″E
- Country: Iran
- Province: Razavi Khorasan
- County: Golbahar
- District: Central
- Rural District: Bizaki

Population (2016)
  - Total: 94
- Time zone: UTC+3:30 (IRST)

Chamleh (Persian: چمله) is a village in Bizaki Rural District of the Central District in Golbahar County, Razavi Khorasan province, Iran.

== Demographics ==
=== Population ===
At the time of the 2006 National Census, the village's population was 135 in 34 households, when it was in the former Golbahar District of Chenaran County. The following census in 2011 counted 64 people in 19 households. The 2016 census measured the population of the village as 94 people in 28 households.

In 2020, the district was separated from the county in the establishment of Golbahar County, and the rural district was transferred to the new Central District.
