= Kalateh-ye Hasan, Golbahar =

Village in Razavi Khorasan province, Iran

Kalateh-ye Hasan Persian: كلاته حسن
- Village
- Location within Iran
- Country: Iran
- Province: Razavi Khorasan
- County: Golbahar
- District: Central
- Rural District: Bizaki

Population (2016)
  - Total: 0
- Time zone: UTC+3:30 (IRST)

Kalateh-ye Hasan (Persian: كلاته حسن) (Note: Also romanized as Kalāteh-ye Ḩasan) is a village in Bizaki Rural District of the Central District in Golbahar County, Razavi Khorasan province, Iran.

== Demographics ==
=== Population ===
At the time of the 2006 National Census, the village's population was 31 in five households, when it was in the former Golbahar District of Chenaran County. The village did not appear in the following census of 2011. The 2016 census measured the population of the village as zero.

In 2020, the district was separated from the county in the establishment of Golbahar County, and the rural district was transferred to the new Central District.
