= Mohsenabad, Golbahar =

Village in Razavi Khorasan province, Iran

Mohsenabad Persian: محسن اباد
- Village
- Location within Iran
- Coordinates: 36°35′14″N 59°14′36″E
- Country: Iran
- Province: Razavi Khorasan
- County: Golbahar
- District: Central
- Rural District: Bizaki

Population (2016)
  - Total: 272
- Time zone: UTC+3:30 (IRST)

Mohsenabad (Persian: محسن اباد) (Note: Also romanized as Mohsenābād; also known as Mohsenābād-e Taheri) is a village in, and the former capital of, Bizaki Rural District in the Central District of Golbahar County, Razavi Khorasan province, Iran. The capital of the rural district has been transferred to the village of Shelangerd.

== Demographics ==
=== Population ===
At the time of the 2006 National Census, the village's population was 260 in 66 households, when it was the capital of the former Golbahar District in Chenaran County. The following census in 2011 counted 450 people in 110 households. The 2016 census measured the population of the village as 272 people in 85 households.

In 2020, the district was separated from the county in the establishment of Golbahar County, and the rural district was transferred to the new Central District.
