= Zohab =

Zohab or Zehab or Zahab (Persian: ذهاب) may refer to:

- Zohab, Hormozgan, Hormozgan Province, Iran
- Zohab, Chenaran, Razavi Khorasan Province, Iran
- Zehab, Fariman, Razavi Khorasan Province, Iran
- Zahab-e Olya, South Khorasan Province, Iran
