= Navakh, Golbahar =

Village in Razavi Khorasan province, Iran

Navakh Persian: ناوخ
- Village
- Location within Iran
- Coordinates: 36°34′53″N 59°16′27″E
- Country: Iran
- Province: Razavi Khorasan
- County: Golbahar
- District: Central
- Rural District: Bizaki

Population (2016)
  - Total: 18
- Time zone: UTC+3:30 (IRST)

Navakh (Persian: ناوخ) (Note: Also romanized as Nāvakh and Nāvokh; also known as Nāvaj) is a village in Bizaki Rural District of the Central District in Golbahar County, Razavi Khorasan province, Iran.

== Demographics ==
=== Population ===
At the time of the 2006 National Census, the village's population was 70 in 13 households, when it was in the former Golbahar District of Chenaran County. The following census in 2011 counted 73 people in 19 households. The 2016 census measured the population of the village as 18 people in five households.

In 2020, the district was separated from the county in the establishment of Golbahar County, and the rural district was transferred to the new Central District.
