= Karim Khan, Iran =

Village in Razavi Khorasan province, Iran

Karim Khan Persian: کریم‌خان
- Village
- Location within Iran
- Coordinates: 36°34′34″N 59°17′25″E
- Country: Iran
- Province: Razavi Khorasan
- County: Golbahar
- District: Central
- Rural District: Bizaki

Population (2016)
  - Total: Below reporting threshold
- Time zone: UTC+3:30 (IRST)

Karim Khan (Persian: کریم‌خان) (Note: Also romanized as Karīm Khān) is a village in Bizaki Rural District of the Central District in Golbahar County, Razavi Khorasan province, Iran.

== Demographics ==
=== Population ===
At the time of the 2006 National Census, the village's population was 21 in five households, when it was in the former Golbahar District of Chenaran County. The following census in 2011 counted 18 people in four households. The 2016 census measured the population of the village as below the reporting threshold.

In 2020, the district was separated from the county in the establishment of Golbahar County, and the rural district was transferred to the new Central District.
