= Solugerd =

Village in Razavi Khorasan province, Iran

Solugerd Persian: سلوگرد
- Village
- Location within Iran
- Coordinates: 36°34′15″N 59°14′06″E
- Country: Iran
- Province: Razavi Khorasan
- County: Golbahar
- District: Central
- Rural District: Bizaki

Population (2016)
  - Total: 1,337
- Time zone: UTC+3:30 (IRST)

Solugerd (Persian: سلوگرد) (Note: Also romanized as Solūgerd; also known as Sūlgar, Sūlgerd, and Sulgird) is a village in Bizaki Rural District of the Central District in Golbahar County, Razavi Khorasan province, Iran.

== Demographics ==
=== Population ===
At the time of the 2006 National Census, the village's population was 1,110 in 271 households, when it was in the former Golbahar District of Chenaran County. The following census in 2011 counted 1,304 people in 368 households. The 2016 census measured the population of the village as 1,337 people in 419 households.

In 2020, the district was separated from the county in the establishment of Golbahar County, and the rural district was transferred to the new Central District.
