= Karangan =

Karangan or Karanagan or Kerengan (Persian: كرنگان) may refer to:

- Karangan, East Azerbaijan
- Karangan, Razavi Khorasan
- Karangan, administrative division of Kulim district in the state of Kedah, Malaysia
- Karangan River, which forms the Sangkulirang bay on the east coast of Borneo
