= Golbahar, Razavi Khorasan =

City in Razavi Khorasan Province, Iran

Golbahar Persian: گلبهار
- City
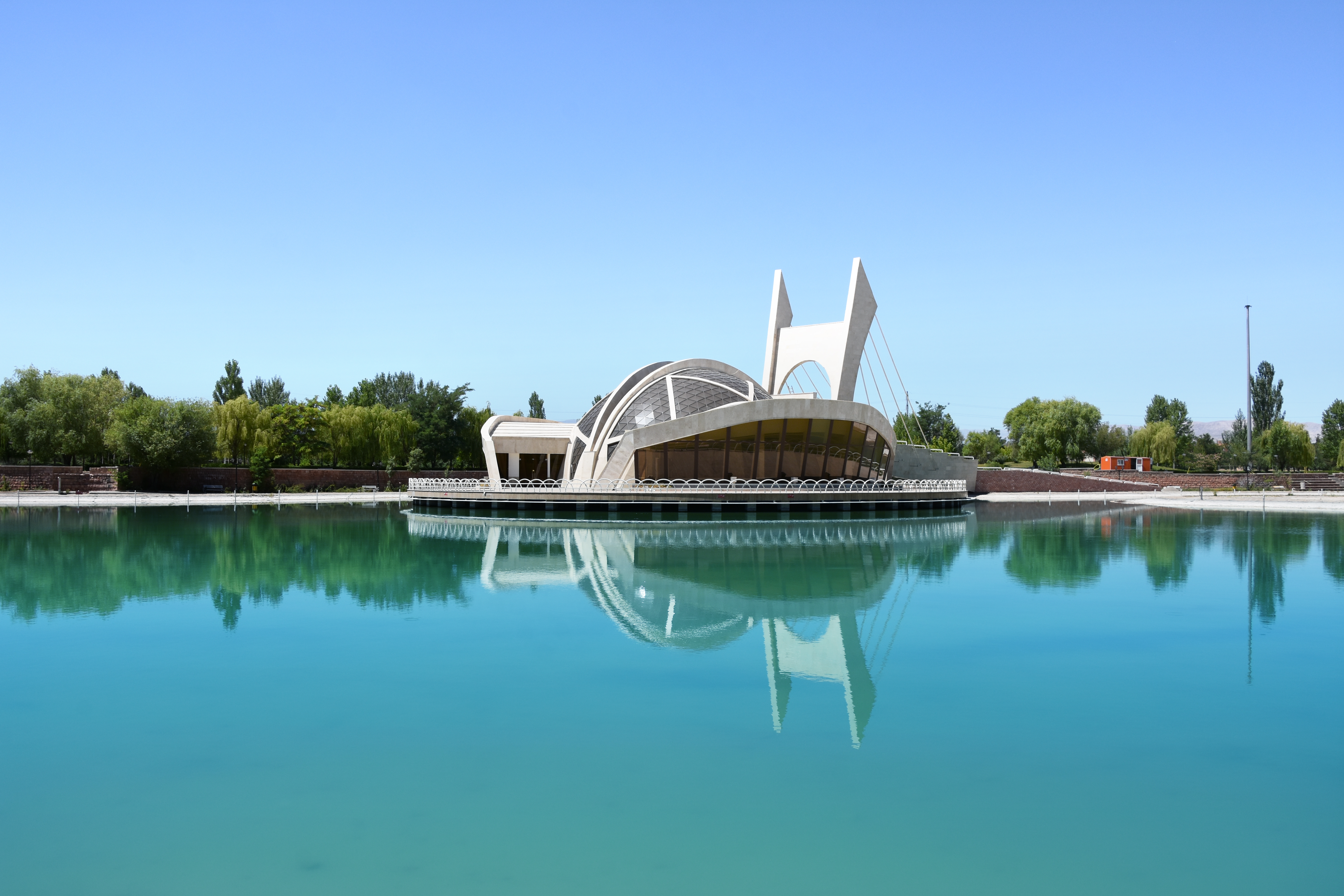
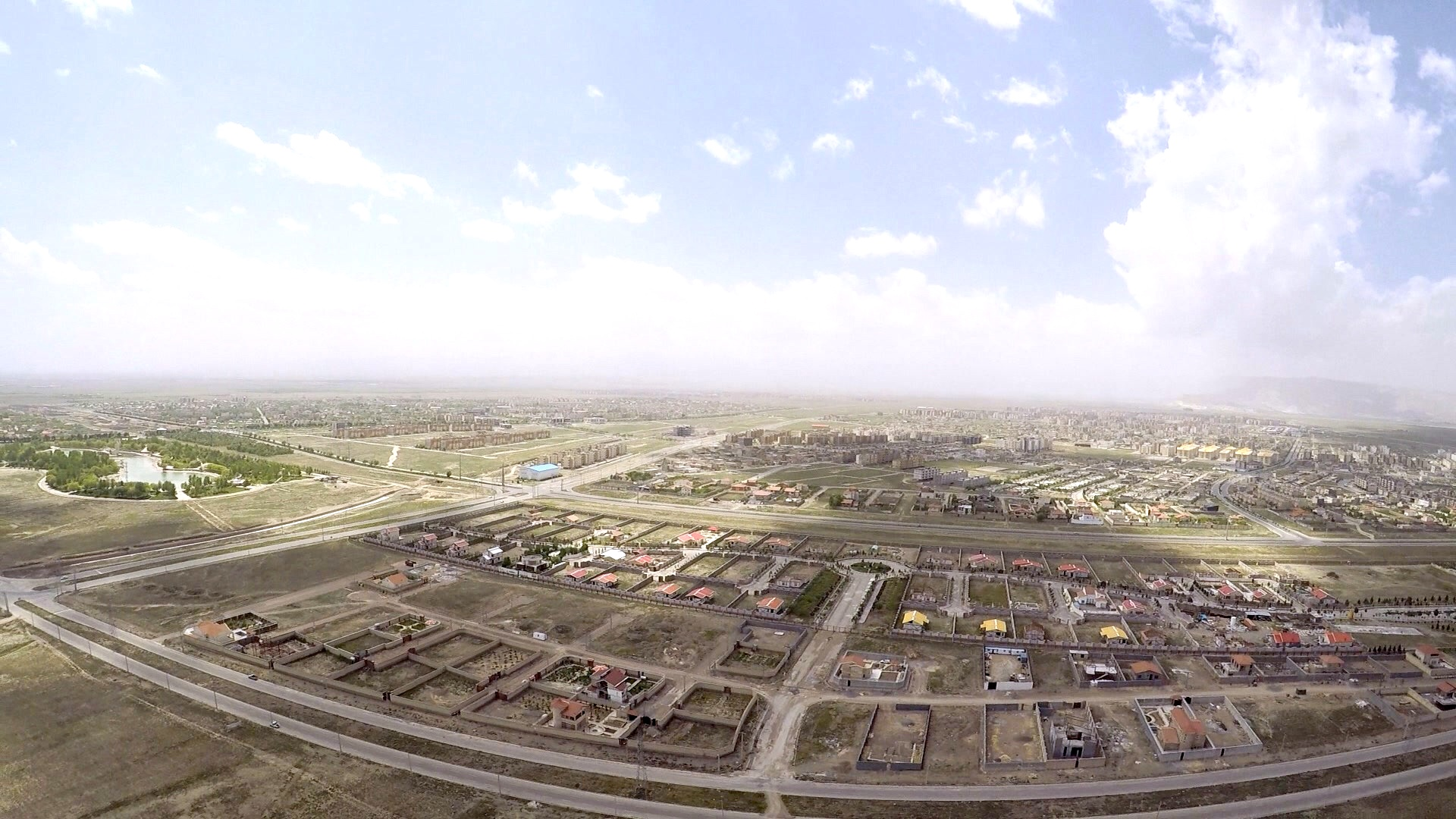

- Location within Iran
- Coordinates: 36°34′12″N 59°11′00″E
- Country: Iran
- Province: Razavi Khorasan
- County: Golbahar
- District: Central
- Elevation: 1,170 to 1,270 m (3,840 to 4,170 ft)

Population (2016)
  - Total: 36,877
- Time zone: UTC+3:30 (IRST)
- Area code: 051
- Website: golbahar-ntoir.gov.ir/portal

Golbahar (Persian: گلبهار) (Note: Also romanized as Golbahār; formerly Golbahar New City Development Project (پروژه عمران شهر جديد گلبها)) is a planned city in the Central District of Golbahar County, Razavi Khorasan province, Iran, serving as capital of both the county and the district. Golbahar, along with Binalud, is one of the planned cities of the province and is 35 kilometers northwest of the Mashhad metropolis near Chenaran.

The new city of Golbahar was built to accommodate the excessive population of Mashhad. This city leads from the south to the Binalud Mountain Range and from the north to the Hezar Masjed Mountains and the Kashafrud River.

== Demographics ==
=== Population ===
At the time of the 2006 National Census, Golbahar's population was 6,889 in 1,773 households, when it was the village of Golbahar New City Development Project in Golmakan Rural District of the former Golbahar District of Chenaran County. The following census in 2011 counted 12,613 people in 3,460 households. The 2016 census measured the population as 36,877 people in 10,854 households, by which time the village had been converted to a city.

In 2020, the district was separated from the county in the establishment of Golbahar County. The city and the rural district were transferred to the new Central District, with Golbahar as the county's capital.

== See also ==
- Mashhad
- Chenaran
