= The BOBs (weblog award) =

World's largest international weblog competition

The BOBs (Best of the Blogs) is the world's largest international weblog competition, founded in 2004 and sponsored by Deutsche Welle, the German International Broadcasting Service.

Through the BOBs, Deutsche Welle focuses attention on the promotion of freedom of information and the press around the world. In cooperation with Reporters Without Borders, Deutsche Welle has presented a special award to bloggers promoting these specific ideals since 2005.

Weblogs, podcasts and videoblogs from all over the world can be submitted for the BOBs in one of the following 14 languages: Arabic, Chinese, German, English, French, Indonesian, Persian, Bengali, Portuguese, Russian, Turkish, Ukrainian, Hindi and Spanish.

The BOBs were last awarded in 2016.

== Award categories ==
The BOBs consist of 6 prize categories (all languages) and one award in each language of the competition (14 languages).

== How the competition works ==
The BOBs presents prizes for both Jury and User's Choice awards. The User's Choice winners are chosen by worldwide online voting. The Jury prizes are awarded by a jury of international bloggers.

== Blogopedia ==
The Blogopedia is an online catalogue featuring a growing inventory of blogs written in eleven languages. It allows the user to browse through the catalog by country, language or subject matter.

To date over 18,000 different blogs, podcasts and videoblogs have been entered into the Blogopedia by users and bloggers from all over the world.

== Winners ==
List of winners year by year:

=== 2004 ===
Award	Jury Award	User Award
Best Weblog	18摸狗日报	Por um Punhado de Pixels
Best Topic	El Hombre Que Comía Diccionarios	Estraga Filmes
Best Design	La malarosa	Замок-блог Эргэла, Северного Дракона
Best Innovation	Domino – Cover by Cover	Radio RSS
Best Weblog in German	medienrauschen	BILDblog
Best Weblog in Arabic	Moodless.net	Beyond Normal
Best Weblog in Chinese	18摸狗日报	声色犬马－平客的虚无笔记
Best Weblog in Spanish	Periodistas 21	Caspa.tv
Best Weblog in English	Lawrence Lessig Blog	Editor: Myself
Best Weblog in Portuguese	Ponto Media	Ricardo Noblat
Best Weblog in Russian	Блог журналистки Наташи Мозговой	Time O'Clock

=== 2005 ===
Award	Jury Award	User Award
Best Weblog	Más respeto, que soy tu madre	Tupiniquim
Best Multimedia Blog	Blog à la ciboulette	Blog à la ciboulette
Best Podcast	Antiwave	Antiwave
Reporters Without Borders Award	Manal and Alaa's Bit Bucket	Chronique déplaisante d'une dictature ordinaire
Best Weblog in Arabic	Hawleyat Al Ashjar	Nisrine coeur de lion
Best Weblog in Chinese	Massage Cream	刀侧畔千帆过
Best Weblog in English	Global Voices Online	Body and Soul
Best Weblog in French	AgoraVox, le journal media citoyen	Lire est un plaisir
Best Weblog in German	Lyssa's Lounge	Riesenmaschine – das brandneue Universum
Best Weblog in Farsi	san newescht	Iran Paparazzi
Best Weblog in Portuguese	NoMínimo Weblog	Kibe Loco
Best Weblog in Russian	Planet Afghanistan	Planet Afghanistan
Best Weblog in Spanish	Jabalí Digital	Caspa TV

=== 2006 ===
Award	Jury Award	User Award
Best Weblog	Sunlight Foundation	Lisa Neun
Best Podcast	Muzimei Studio	Haftegi
Best Corporate Weblog	Football-Club	Blog do Tas
Reporters Without Borders Award	Tanine Sokut y Kosoof (two awards)	Blog da Alcinéa Cavalcante
Blogwurst Award	Mehrdad Aref-Adib	Unusual Real Man
Best Weblog in Arabic	Jar el Kamar	Nostalgic Story Teller
Best Weblog in Chinese	The Colourful World – Shuweicao's Blog	The Colourful World – Shuweicao's Blog
Best Weblog in Dutch	Bureau Belgrado	Bieslog
Best Weblog in English	PaidContent.org	Black Looks
Best Weblog in French	La Buvette des Alpages	La Buvette des Alpages
Best Weblog in German	Letters from Rungholt	Beetlebum
Best Weblog in Farsi	Zeitun	n/d
Best Weblog in Portuguese	Apocalipse Motorizado	Garotas Que Dizem Ni
Best Weblog in Russian	Magazeta: All about China	Magazeta: All about China
Best Weblog in Spanish	La Huella Digital	Mangas Verdes

=== 2007 ===
Award	Jury Award	User Award
Best Weblog	Fotomania	Blog do Tas
Best Podcast	Die Gefühlskonserve	Nerdcast
Best Vídeoblog	Alive in Baghdad	Cat Ear Baby's Videoblog
Reporters Without Borders Award	Jotman	Nora Younis
Blogwurst Award	Little Galerie	Yo contra el mundo
Best Weblog in Arabic	Aljazeera Talk	Imtidad
Best Weblog in Chinese	Lian Yue's Eighth Continent	Lian Yue's Eighth Continent
Best Weblog in Dutch	Frankwatching	Volkskrantblog
Best Weblog in English	Valour-IT	RidorLive
Best Weblog in French	Actualités de la république démocratique du Congo	ouVertures.info
Best Weblog in German	Behindertenparkplatz	Bestatterweblog
Best Weblog in Farsi	35 Grad	Masih
Best Weblog in Portuguese	Blog do Tas	Pensar Enlouquece, Pense Nisso
Best Weblog in Russian	/dev/karlson/mind.log	/dev/karlson/mind.log
Best Weblog in Spanish	A mis 95	A mis 95

=== 2008 ===
Award	Jury Award	User Award
Best Weblog	Generation Y	Science Squirrel
Best Podcast	Radio Grinch	Bola Nas Costas Iscuitantes
Best Videoblog	Voices of Africa	Videoblog do Trajano
Reporters Without Borders Award	曾金燕博客 and 4equality (two awards)	Generation Y
Blogwurst Award	Maratochka	Mister Oof
Best Weblog in Arabic	Ohod	Vor der Flut
Best Weblog in Chinese	刘晓原的BLOG	Science Squirrel
Best Weblog in Dutch	Foodlog	Free Opinion Venezuela
Best Weblog in English	Political Party Blog	The Consumerist
Best Weblog in French	Le Blog de Yoro	Vos photos
Best Weblog in German	Mädchenmannschaft	Naher und Mittlerer Osten – الشرق
Best Weblog in Indonesian	Media Ide	maseko's weblog
Best Weblog in Farsi	freelancer	Ich und MS
Best Weblog in Portuguese	Querido Leitor	Querido Leitor
Best Weblog in Russian	MetroDream by Russos	##1244462644726369HNIOWAST##
Best Weblog in Spanish	233grados.com	Bestiaria

=== 2009–2010 ===
Award	Jury Award	User Award
Best Weblog	Ushahidi	Osama Romoh
Best Podcast	Cajun French Language Tutorials	Radiokalu
Best Vídeoblog	Mr. Free Man	Malviviendo
Reporters Without Borders Award	We are Journalists	Holom Akhdar
Blogwurst Award	Blogs do Além and Wake up, Mr. Green (two awards)	Ibda3at
Special Topic Award – Climate Change	Coluna Zero	Ecoplaneta
Best Weblog in Arabic	Osama Romoh	Medad
Best Weblog in Bengali	Ali Mahmeds Blog	Ali Mahmeds Blog
Best Weblog in Chinese	Ke Neng Ba	Ke Neng Ba
Best Weblog in English	Talk Morocco	Talk Morocco
Best Weblog in French	Le Monolecte	La vigie du web
Best Weblog in German	Der Postillon	Der Postillon
Best Weblog in Indonesian	Catatan Ringan Angin-anginan	Catatan Dari Hati
Best Weblog in Farsi	mamlekate (so just what kind of country is this that we live in)	Life in Bamian
Best Weblog in Portuguese	Física na Veia	Digital Drops
Best Weblog in Russian	metkere.com	Slon.ru
Best Weblog in Spanish	La Vuelta al Mundo de Asun y Ricardo	Malviviendo

=== 2011 ===
Award	Jury Award	User Award
Best Weblog	A Tunisian Girl	Vahid Nikgoo y Jou3an (two awards)
Best Use Of Technology For Social Good	Rospil	Rospil
Best Social Activism Campaign	We are all Khaled Said	Omipial's Blog
Reporteros Sin Fronteras Award	Ciudad Juárez, en la sombra del narcotráfico	Blog Novaya Gazeta
Special Topic Award Human Rights	Migrant Rights in the Middle East	Indigenous Bengali Blog
Best Video Channel	Stands with Fist	Isla Presidencial
Best Weblog in Arabic		Violet Revolution
Best Weblog in Bengalí		Arif Jebtik's Blog
Best Weblog in Chinese		Translator
Best Weblog in English		Rantings of a Sandmonkey
Best Weblog in French		Serious Game (Belgique)
Best Weblog in German		Textilvergehen
Best Weblog in Indonesian		Benablog
Best Weblog in Farsi		Sulgar
Best Weblog in Portuguese		Vá de bike
Best Weblog in Russian		Navalny
Best Weblog in Spanish		Alberto Montt

=== 2012 ===
Award	Jury Award	User Award
Best Weblog	Window of Anguish	Jou3an
Best Use Of Technology For Social Good	Harassmap	Web Nabludatel
Best Social Activism Campaign	Free Razan	Asif Mohiuddin's Blog
Premio Reporteros Sin Fronteras	Abu Sufian's Blog	Woeser
Best Video Channel	Kuang Kuang	Internautismo crónico
Special Topic Award Education and Culture	Fasokan	Grazhdanin Poet
Best Weblog in Arabic		Khaled Safi
Best Weblog in Bengali		Niaz Mowla's Blog
Best Weblog in Chinese		iGFW
Best Weblog in English		The Chronikler
Best Weblog in French		Kamer Kongossa
Best Weblog in German		Jule's Blog
Best Weblog in Indonesian		Wordsmith
Best Weblog in Farsi		Narenji
Best Weblog in Portuguese		Music With Books
Best Weblog in Russian		Staskulesh
Best Weblog in Spanish		Chinochano

=== 2013 ===
Award	Jury Award	User Award
Best Person to Follow in Bengali		Saif Samir (Movie Critic Blog)
Global Media Forum	Totthokollani	
Best Innovation		Shikkhok
Best Weblog in Bengali		Shoily

== See also ==
- Deutsche Welle
- Reporters Without Borders
