= Derakht-e Senjed =

Derakht-e Senjed (Persian: درخت سنجد) may refer to:

- Derakht-e Senjed, Chenaran
- Derakht-e Senjed, Nishapur
- Derakht-e Senjed, Torbat-e Heydarieh
