= Chamleh =

Chamleh or Chamaleh (Persian: چمله) may refer to:

- Chamleh, Razavi Khorasan
- Chamleh, Zanjan
