= Baiza =

Baiza may refer to:

- Joe Baiza (b. 1952), musician
- Baiza, Iran, a village in Razavi Khorasan Province, Iran
