= Navakh =

Navakh or Navokh (Persian: ناوخ) may refer to:

- Navakh, Gilan
- Navakh, Chenaran, Razavi Khorasan Province
- Navakh, Quchan, Razavi Khorasan Province
