= Kalateh-ye Hasan =

Kalateh-ye Hasan (Persian: كلاته حسن) may refer to:

- Kalateh-ye Hasan, Chenaran, Razavi Khorasan Province
- Kalateh-ye Hasan, South Khorasan

== See also ==
- Kalateh-ye Hasan Qoli
