= Now Bahar Rural District =

Rural district in Razavi Khorasan province, Iran

Now Bahar Rural District Persian: دهستان نوبهار
- Rural District
- Location within Iran
- Coordinates: 36°39′N 59°12′E
- Country: Iran
- Province: Razavi Khorasan
- County: Golbahar
- District: Central
- Established: 2020
- Capital: Now Bahar
- Time zone: UTC+3:30 (IRST)

Now Bahar Rural District (Persian: دهستان نوبهار) is in the Central District of Golbahar County, Razavi Khorasan province, Iran. Its capital is the village of Now Bahar, whose population at the time of the 2016 National Census was 2,367 in 698 households.

In 2020, Golbahar District was separated from Chenaran County in the establishment of Golbahar County, and Now Bahar Rural District was created in the new Central District.

== Other villages in the rural district ==
- Bazeh
- Charmi
- Dastgerd
- Derakht-e Senjed
- Golek
- Golom
- Hajj Esmail
- Hajjiabad
- Hasanabad-e Amelzadeh
- Hiteh Tala
- Hoseyn Naju
- Il Hesar
- Juqan
- Kalateh-ye Sheykhha
- Kamalabad
- Karangan
- Khanabad
- Kortu
- Manqeshli
- Mehdi Soltan
- Mohammadabad-e Baluch
- Momenabad
- Musaabad
- Najmabad
- Nasrabad
- Now Mehan
- Owtan
- Qarah Kuseh
- Sar Asiab
- Seyyedabad
- Taherabad
- Tomandar
- Yusefabad
- Zanaqol
- Zohab
