= Mirza Hassan =

Mirza Hassan may refer to:

- Mirza Hassan, one of the sons of Mariam-uz-Zamani
- Mirza Hasan, village in Iran
- Mírzá Muhammad-Hasan, one of the Núrayn-i-Nayyirayn brothers
- Mirza Hesam, village in Iran
- Mirza Hasan Kandi, village in Iran
