= Karim Khan (disambiguation) =

Karim Khan (Persian: كريمخان, also transliterated as Karīm Khān) is a Persian name. It may refer to:

== People ==
- Muhammad Shah II (r. 1442–1451), born Karim Khan, ruler of the Gujarat Sultanate in India
- Karim Khan Zand (1705–1779), founder of the Zand dynasty
- Karim Khan Sadiq (born 1984), Afghan cricketer
- Karim Ahmad Khan (born 1970), British lawyer who served as Chief Prosecutor of the International Criminal Court
- Karim Khan Kermani (1810–1873), Shia Islamic scholar
- Abdul Karim Khan (1872–1937), Indian singer
- Abdal-Karim Khan Astrakhani (died 1520), Khan of Astrakhan
- Prince Karim Khan, 20th-century Balochi noble
- Abdul Karim Khan (Yarkand), 16th-century ruler of Yarkand Khanate
- Karim M. Khan (born 1960), a Canadian/Australian sport and exercise medicine physician
- Karimullah Khan, one of the perpetrators of the 1993 Bombay bombings

== Places in Iran ==
- Arg of Karim Khan, castle in Shiraz
- Karim Khan Zand Boulevard, in Shiraz
- Karim Khan, Iran, village in Razavi Khorasan Province
- Shurabeh-ye Karim Khan, village in Lorestan Province
- Mowtowr-e Karim Khan, village in Sistan and Baluchestan Province
