= Esmaeil =

Esmaeil is a masculine given name of Arabic origin. Notable people with the name include:

== Given name ==
- Esmaeil Abbasian (born 1989), Iranian futsal player
- Esmaeil Bale (born 1985), Iranian footballer
- Esmaeil Dousti (born 1958), Iranian reformist politician
- Esmaeil Ebadi (born 1976), Iranian archer
- Esmaeil Elmkhah (1936–1988), Iranian featherweight weightlifter
- Esmaeil Esmaeili (born 1967), Iranian football coach and player
- Esmaeil Farhadi (born 1982), Iranian footballer
- Esmaeil Gholizadeh (born 2006), Iranian footballer
- Esmaeil Halali (born 1973), Iranian football player and manager
- Esmaeil Hosseini (born 1942), Iranian cyclist
- Esmaeil Jabbarzadeh (born 1960), Iranian reformist politician
- Esmaeil Khatib (born 1961), Iranian cleric and politician
- Esmaeil Kousari (born 1955), Iranian military officer and politician
- Esmaeil Mosafer (born 1997), Iranian volleyball player
- Esmaeil Pashapour (born 1954), Iranian fencer
- Esmaeil Haj Rahimipour (born 1951), Iranian footballer
- Esmaeil Sedigh, Iranian futsal coach and instructor
- Esmaeil Sharifat (born 1988), Iranian footballer
- Esmaeil Sohrabi (born 1938), Iranian military officer
- Esmaeil Yaghmaei (1941–2026), Iranian archaeologist and writer
- Seyed Esmaeil Mousavi Zanjani (1928–2002), Iranian Shiite cleric and politician

== See also ==
- Hajj Esmaeil, a village in Bizaki Rural District, Golbajar District, Chenaran County, Razavi Khorasan Province, Iran
- Emamzadeh Esmaeil and Isaiah mausoleum, historical complex in Isfahan, Iran, which dates back to the Seljuk and Safavid era
