= Magazeta =

- Screenshot of the main page
- Website type: Collaborative blog
- Available in: Russian
- Creator: Alexander Maltsev
- Website: magazeta.com
- Commercial: No
- Registration: Not required
- Launched: October 2005

Magazeta (Russian: Магазета) is a popular Russian-language web-magazine and collaborative blog on China and Chinese culture.

== Name and history ==
Founded in 2005 by Alexander Maltsev (马玉玺, Mǎ Yùxǐ), Magazeta developed from a LJ blog. The first publication is dated October 23, 2005.

In October 2006 Magazeta received two awards in The Best of Blogs competition.

In May 2007, Magazeta is re-launched at the current address, magazeta.com.

Magazeta was initially authored by a single person, but then was transformed into a collaborative blog with a number of authors.

The name "Magazeta" derives from the word "Ma" (the founder's Chinese surname), plus the Russian word "gazeta" (a journal, newspaper).

== Blocking ==
Magazeta experienced several bans by the PRC authorities up to a complete blocking in September 2007. After more than a year, the website was unblocked by the Great Firewall in November 2008.

== Projects and articles ==
Magazeta has started several online projects related to China, such as:

- Online Chinese-Russian dictionary of slang (including Internet slang)
- Laowaicast, a popular podcast on China-related topics, winner of Podcast Awards 2010 and 2011 in multiple categories, finalist of The BOBs in 2010.
- ChinaFilm, a collaborative translation project for Chinese movies

=== Topics ===
Recurrent topics for articles in Magazeta include:

- Chinese character of the day
- China-related news
- Chinese culture
- Chinese films
- Chinese language
- Photos of China
- Chinese music
- Interviews
- Podcasts

== See also ==
- Internet in the People's Republic of China
