= Zehab, Fariman =

Zehab ذهاب
- Village
- Location within Iran
- Coordinates: 35°36′46″N 59°43′33″E
- Country: Iran
- Province: Razavi Khorasan
- County: Fariman
- Bakhsh: Central
- Rural District: Balaband

Population (2006)
  - Total: 48
- Time zone: UTC+3:30 (IRST)
  - Summer (DST): UTC+4:30 (IRDT)

Zehab (Persian: ذهاب, also Romanized as Z̄ehāb and Z̄ohāb) is a village in Balaband Rural District, in the Central District of Fariman County, Razavi Khorasan Province, Iran. At the 2006 census, its population was 48, in 13 families.
