= Chenaran =

City in Razavi Khorasan province, Iran

Chenaran Persian: چناران
- City
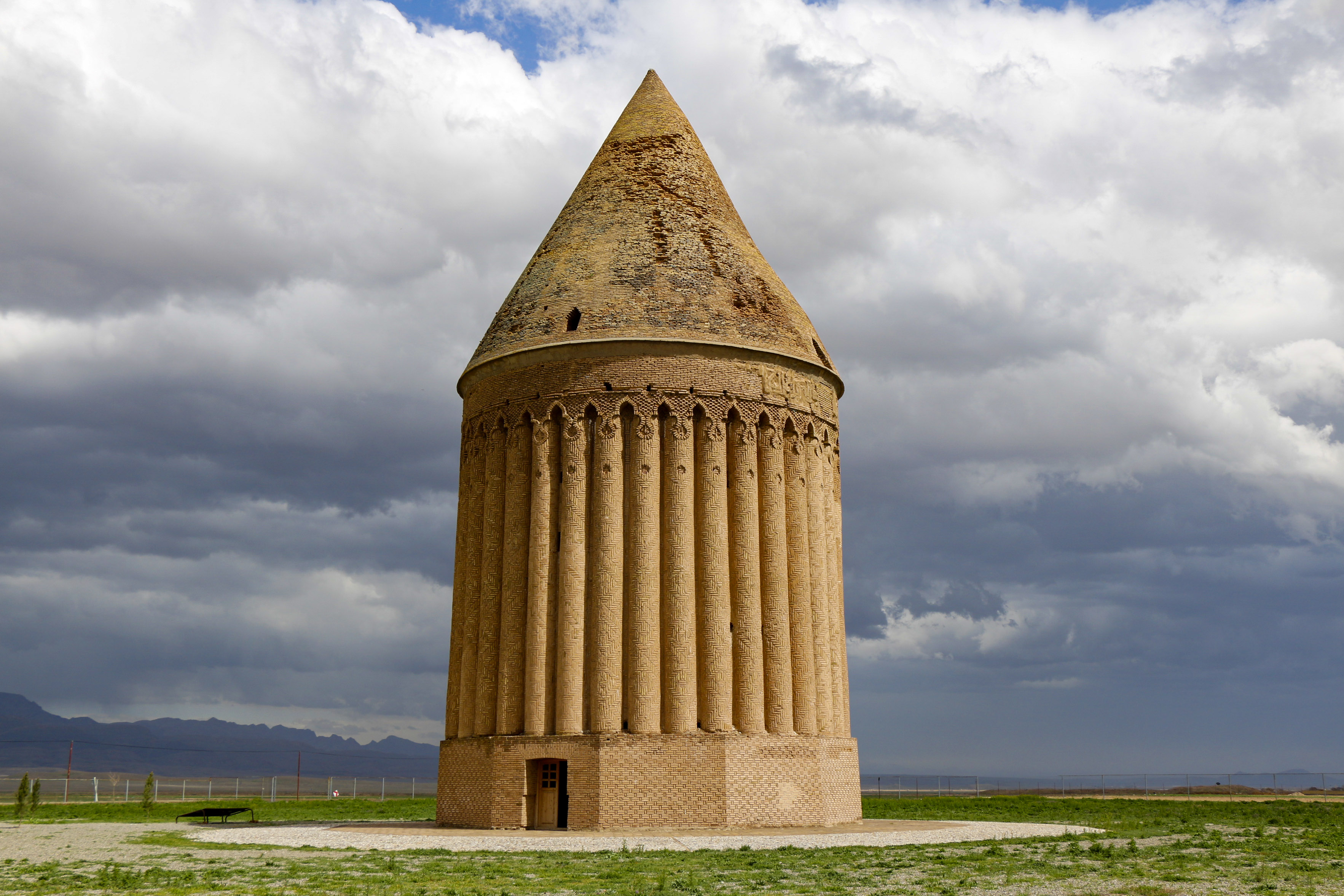
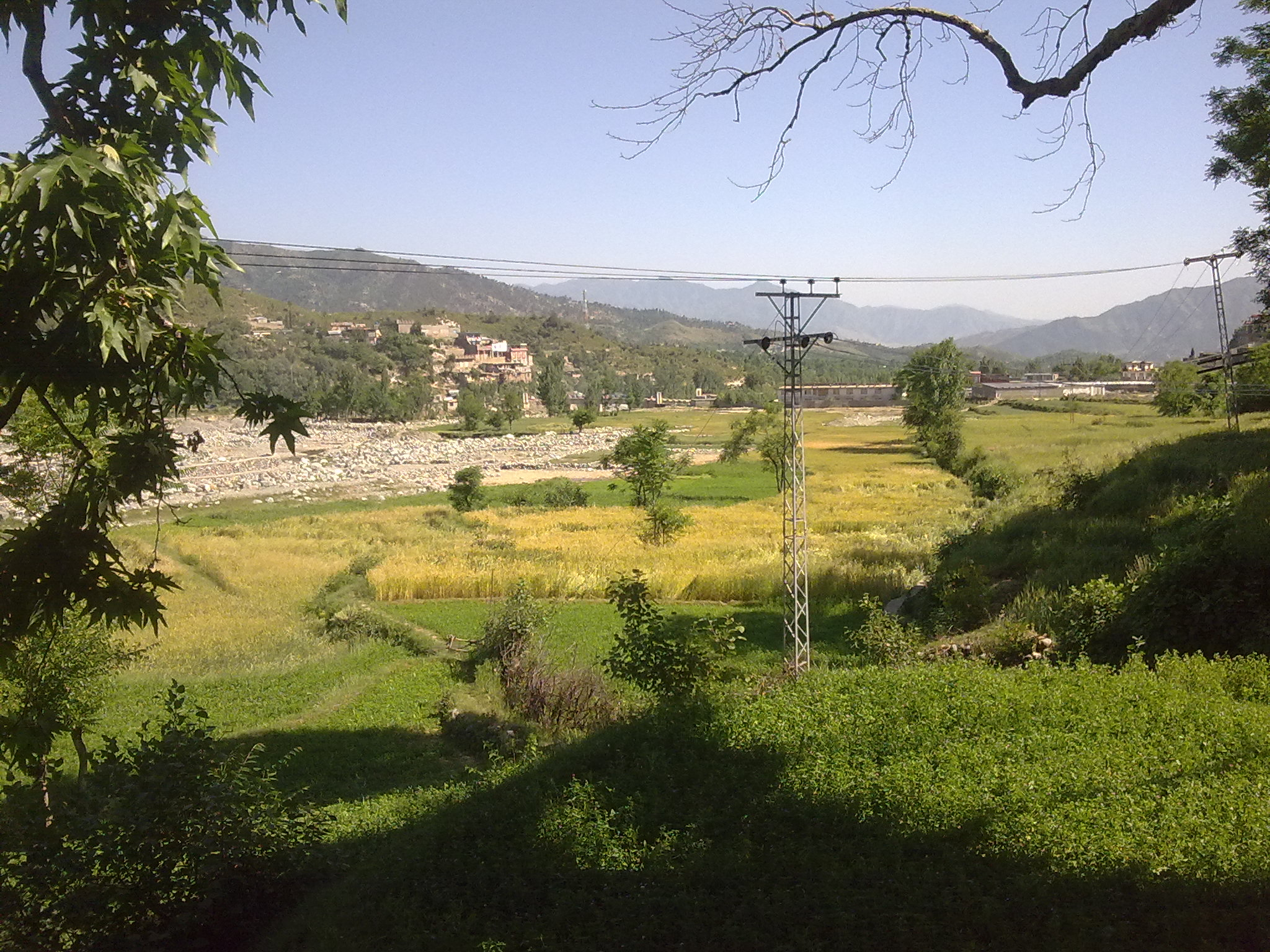
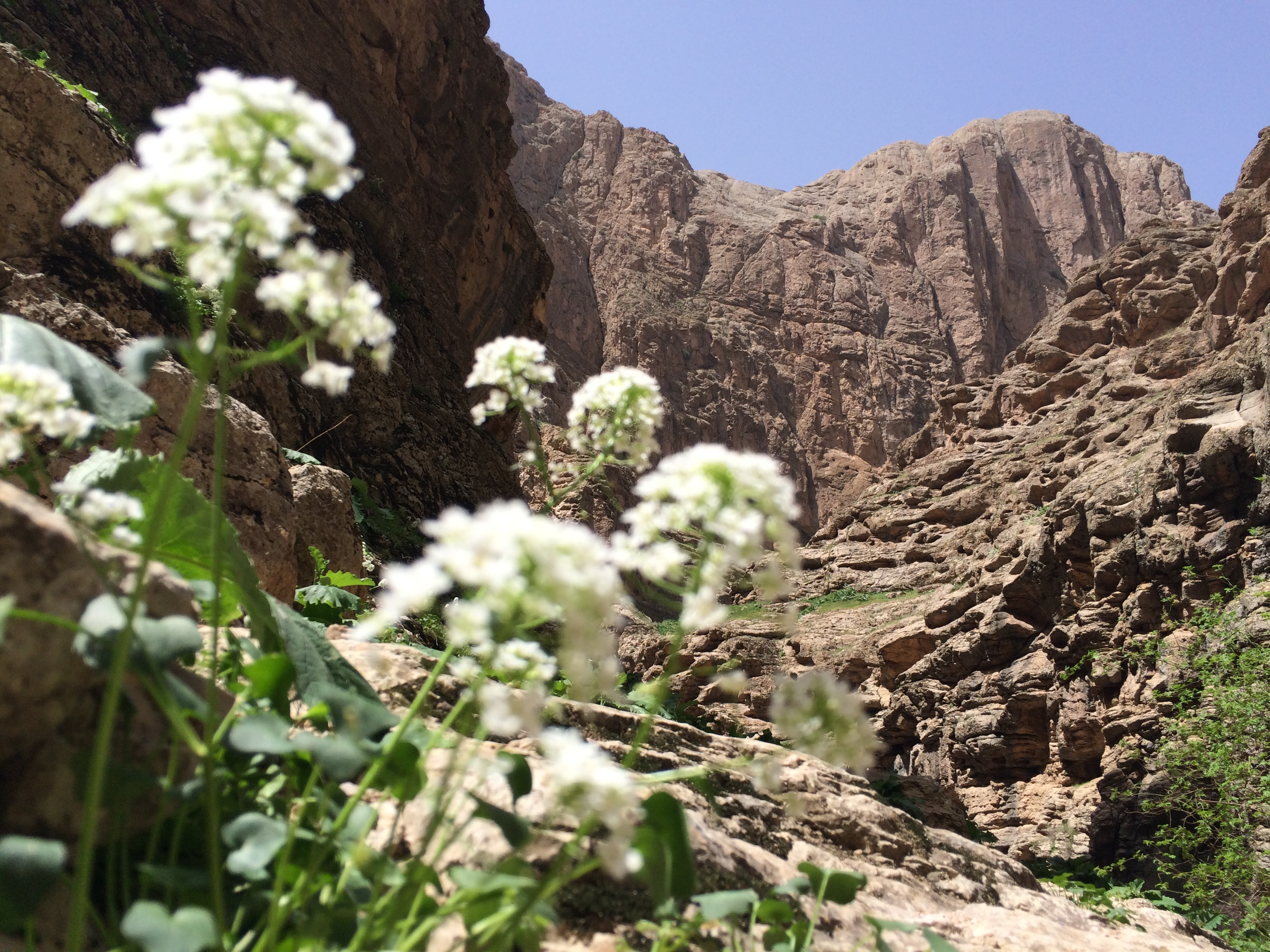
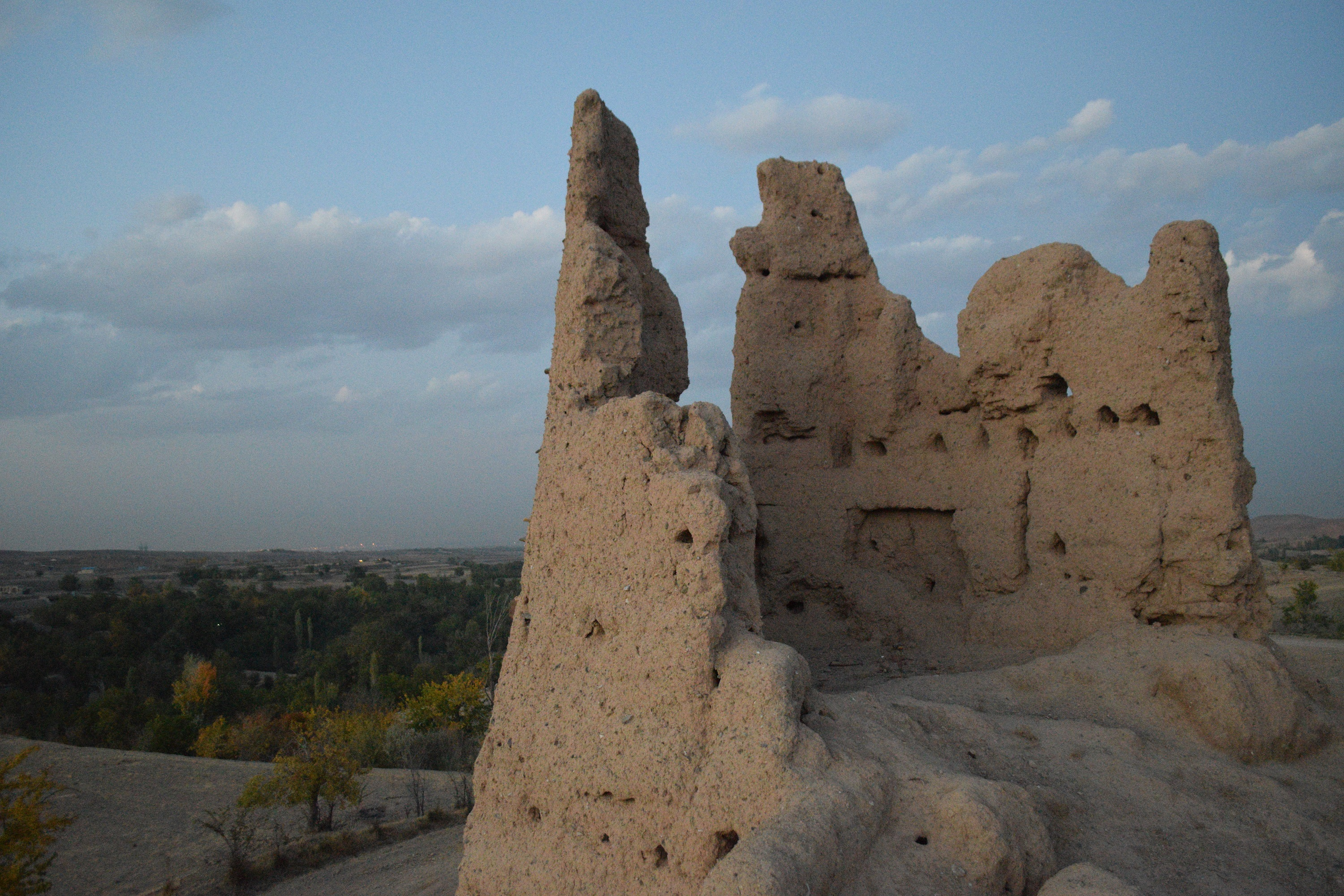
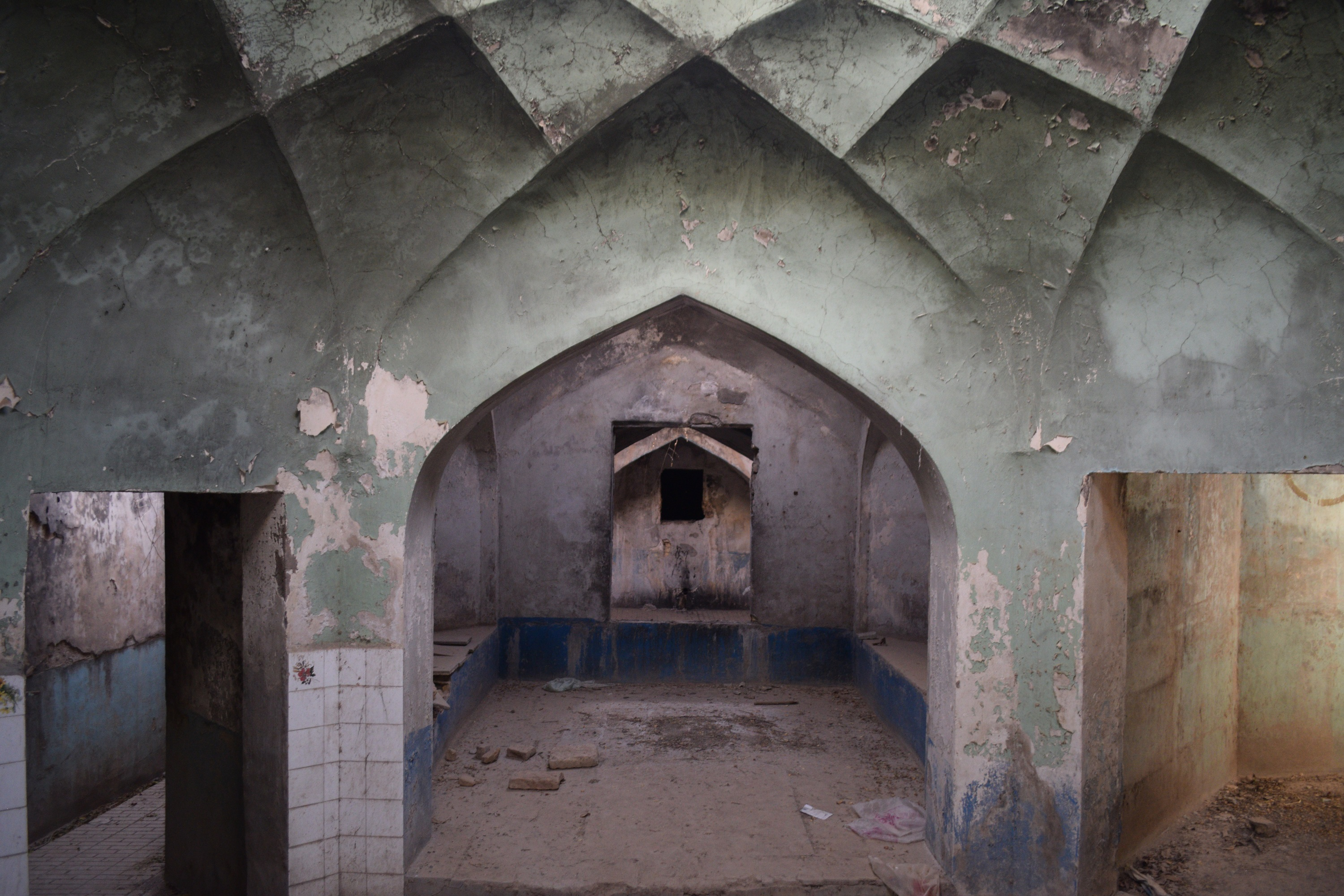

- Location within Iran
- Coordinates: 36°38′26″N 59°07′07″E
- Country: Iran
- Province: Razavi Khorasan
- County: Chenaran
- District: Central

Population (2016)
  - Total: 53,879
- Time zone: UTC+3:30 (IRST)

Chenaran (Persian: چناران) (Note: Also romanized as Cenârân, Čenārān, and Chanārān; also known as Chinārān) is a city in the Central District of Chenaran County, Razavi Khorasan province, Iran, serving as capital of both the county and the district.

Chenaran is a touristic city located under the bridge called Shiny Bridge. It is mostly famous for its tourist objectives. Tourists come to take a look at the city over the famous Shiny Bridge. The city favors from a mountainous weather plus rich wildlife.

== Demographics ==
=== Population ===
At the time of the 2006 National Census, the city's population was 41,735 in 10,179 households. The following census in 2011 counted 48,567 people in 13,337 households. The 2016 census measured the population of the city as 53,879 people in 15,609 households.

== Geography ==
=== Location ===
Chenaran is located on the north axis to Mashhad metropolis and you can enter this city from road 22 or Asian highway. With the completion of the Mashhad-Golbahar-Chenaran subway and the completion of the Mashhad-Chennaran freeway, these three cities will be easier to access each other.

=== Climate ===
Its climate is hot in summer and cold in winter. Also, its climate in spring is often very rainy and with strong winds and due to its relatively close distance to Mashhad, it is known as the summer resort of Mashhad.
