= Bizaki Rural District =

Rural district in Razavi Khorasan province, Iran

Bizaki Rural District Persian: دهستان بيزكي
- Rural District
- Location within Iran
- Coordinates: 36°41′N 59°19′E
- Country: Iran
- Province: Razavi Khorasan
- County: Golbahar
- District: Central
- Established: 1986
- Capital: Shelangerd

Population (2016)
  - Total: 12,134
- Time zone: UTC+3:30 (IRST)

Bizaki Rural District (Persian: دهستان بيزكي) is in the Central District of Golbahar County, Razavi Khorasan province, Iran. Its capital is the village of Shelangerd. The previous capital of the rural district was the village of Mohsenabad.

== Demographics ==
=== Population ===
At the time of the 2006 National Census, the rural district's population (as a part of the former Golbahar District in Chenaran County) was 11,740 in 2,840 households. There were 10,885 inhabitants in 3,032 households at the following census of 2011. The 2016 census measured the population of the rural district as 12,134 in 3,685 households. The most populous of its 118 villages was Now Bahar (now in Now Bahar Rural District), with 2,367 people.

In 2020, the district was separated from the county in the establishment of Golbahar County, and the rural district was transferred to the new Central District.

=== Other villages in the rural district ===
- Aliabad
- Bakhtabad
- Chamleh
- Cheshmeh Gilas
- Darangun
- Dulkhan
- Ebrahimabad
- Fallahabad
- Fang
- Fathabad
- Ganju
- Guri
- Hakimabad
- Hasanabad-e Manqeshli
- Jow-e Pain
- Kalateh-ye Ali Khan
- Kalateh-ye Hasan
- Kalateh-ye Qanbar Ali
- Kalateh-ye Shirin
- Kalateh-ye Tolaki
- Karim Khan
- Kusan
- Mehrabad
- Mirza Hasan
- Navakh
- Neyestan
- Pas Poshteh
- Pishavak
- Pushan
- Qarah Jangal
- Qashqabad
- Sanqasi
- Shah Galdi
- Shirin
- Shurak
- Solugerd
- Tavil
