= Central District (Golbahar County) =

District in Razavi Khorasan province, Iran

Central District (Golbahar County) Persian: بخش مرکزی شهرستان گلبهار
- District
- Location within Iran
- Coordinates: 36°41′N 59°18′E
- Country: Iran
- Province: Razavi Khorasan
- County: Golbahar
- Established: 2020
- Capital: Golbahar
- Time zone: UTC+3:30 (IRST)

The Central District of Golbahar County (Persian: بخش مرکزی شهرستان گلبهار) is in Razavi Khorasan province, Iran. Its capital is the city of Golbahar, (Note: Formerly Golbahar New City Development Project) whose population at the time of the 2016 National Census was 36,877 people in 10,854 households.

== History ==
In 2020, Golbahar District was separated from Chenaran County in the establishment of Golbahar County, which was divided into two districts of two rural districts each, with Golbahar as its capital.

== Demographics ==
=== Administrative divisions ===
Central District (Golbahar County)
Administrative Divisions
Bizaki RD
Now Bahar RD
Golbahar (city)
RD = Rural District
