= Golbahar County =

County in Razavi Khorasan Province, Iran

Golbahar County Persian: شهرستان گلبهار
- County
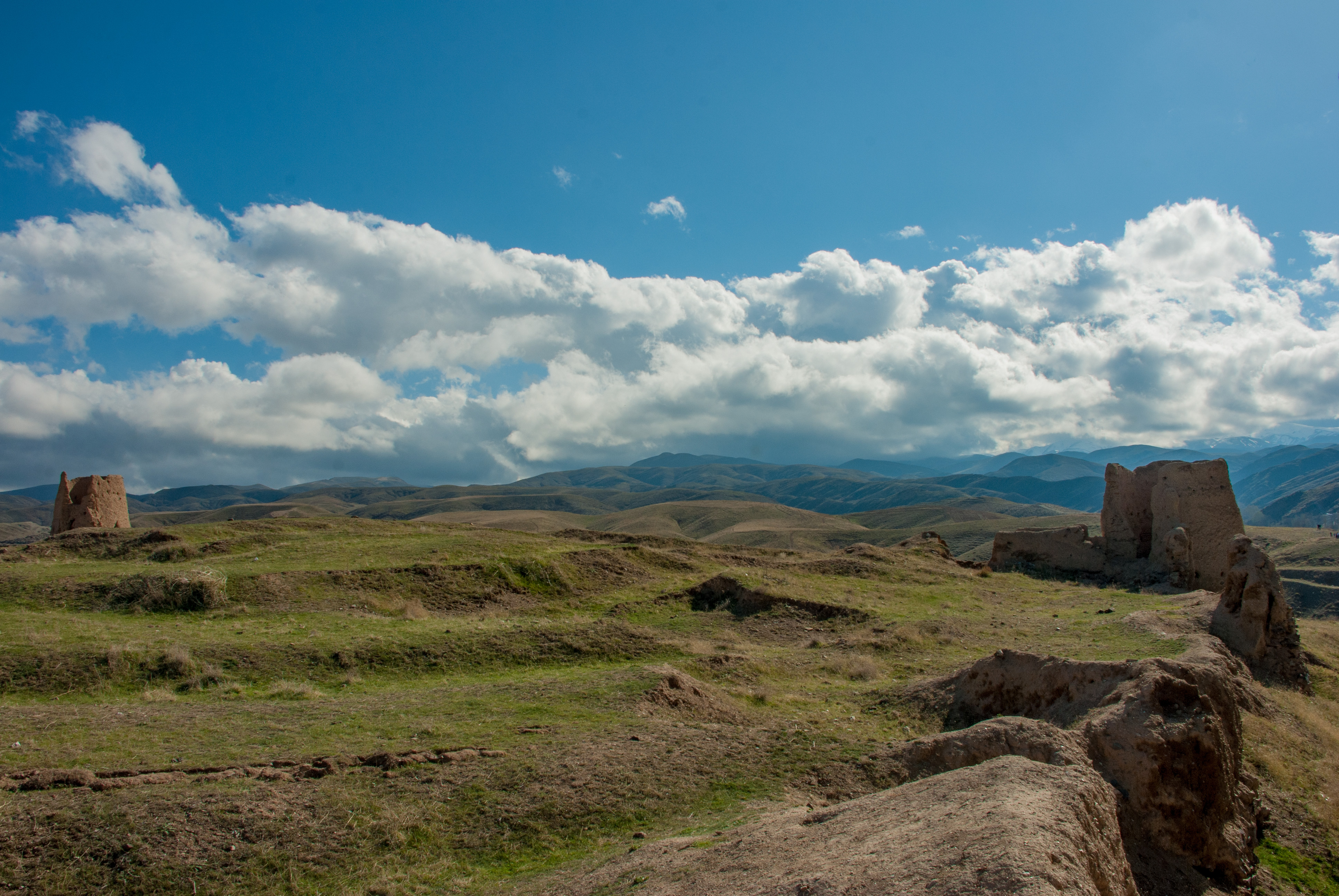
- Esjil Hill and Gohhab Binalud in the background

- Location of Golbahar County in Razavi Khorasan province (top center, yellow)

- Location of Razavi Khorasan province in Iran
- Coordinates: 36°35′N 59°09′E
- Country: Iran
- Province: Razavi Khorasan
- Established: 2020
- Capital: Golbahar
- Districts: Central, Golmakan

Area
  - Total: 1,007 km^{2} (389 sq mi)
- Time zone: UTC+3:30 (IRST)

Golbahar County (Persian: شهرستان گلبهار) is in Razavi Khorasan province, Iran. Its capital is the city of Golbahar, (Note: Formerly Golbahar New City Development Project) whose population at the time of the 2016 National Census was 36,877 people in 10,854 households.

== History ==
In 2020, Golbahar District was separated from Chenaran County in the establishment of Golbahar County, which was divided into two districts of two rural districts each, with Golbahar as its capital.

== Demographics ==
=== Administrative divisions ===
Golbahar County's administrative structure is shown in the following table.

Golbahar County
Administrative Divisions
Central District
Bizaki RD
Now Bahar RD
Golbahar (city)
Golmakan District
Cheshmeh Sabz RD
Golmakan RD
Golmakan (city)
RD = Rural District

== See also ==
Media related to Golbahar County at Wikimedia Commons
