= Golbahar District =

Former district in Razavi Khorasan province, Iran

Golbahar District Persian: بخش گلبهار
- Former District
- Location within Iran
- Coordinates: 36°35′N 59°09′E
- Country: Iran
- Province: Razavi Khorasan
- County: Chenaran
- Established: 1990
- Capital: Mohsenabad

Population (2016)
  - Total: 66,321
- Time zone: UTC+3:30 (IRST)

Golbahar District (Persian: بخش گلبهار) is a former administrative division of Chenaran County, Razavi Khorasan province, Iran. Its capital was the village of Mohsenabad.

== History ==
The village of Golmakan was converted to a city in 2007. The new city of Golbahar was formed in 2014.

In 2020, the district was separated from the county in the establishment of Golbahar County.

== Demographics ==
=== Population ===
At the time of the 2006 National Census, the district's population was 34,556 in 8,800 households. The following census in 2011 counted 40,785 people in 11,969 households. The 2016 census measured the population of the district as 66,321 inhabitants in 20,164 households.

=== Administrative divisions ===
Golbahar District Population
Administrative Divisions	2006	2011	2016
Bizaki RD	11,740	10,885	12,134
Golmakan RD	22,816	20,366	8,937
Golbahar (city)			36,877
Golmakan (city)		9,534	8,373
Total	34,556	40,785	66,321
RD = Rural District
