= Chenaran County =

County in Razavi Khorasan Province, Iran

Chenaran County Persian: شهرستان چناران
- County
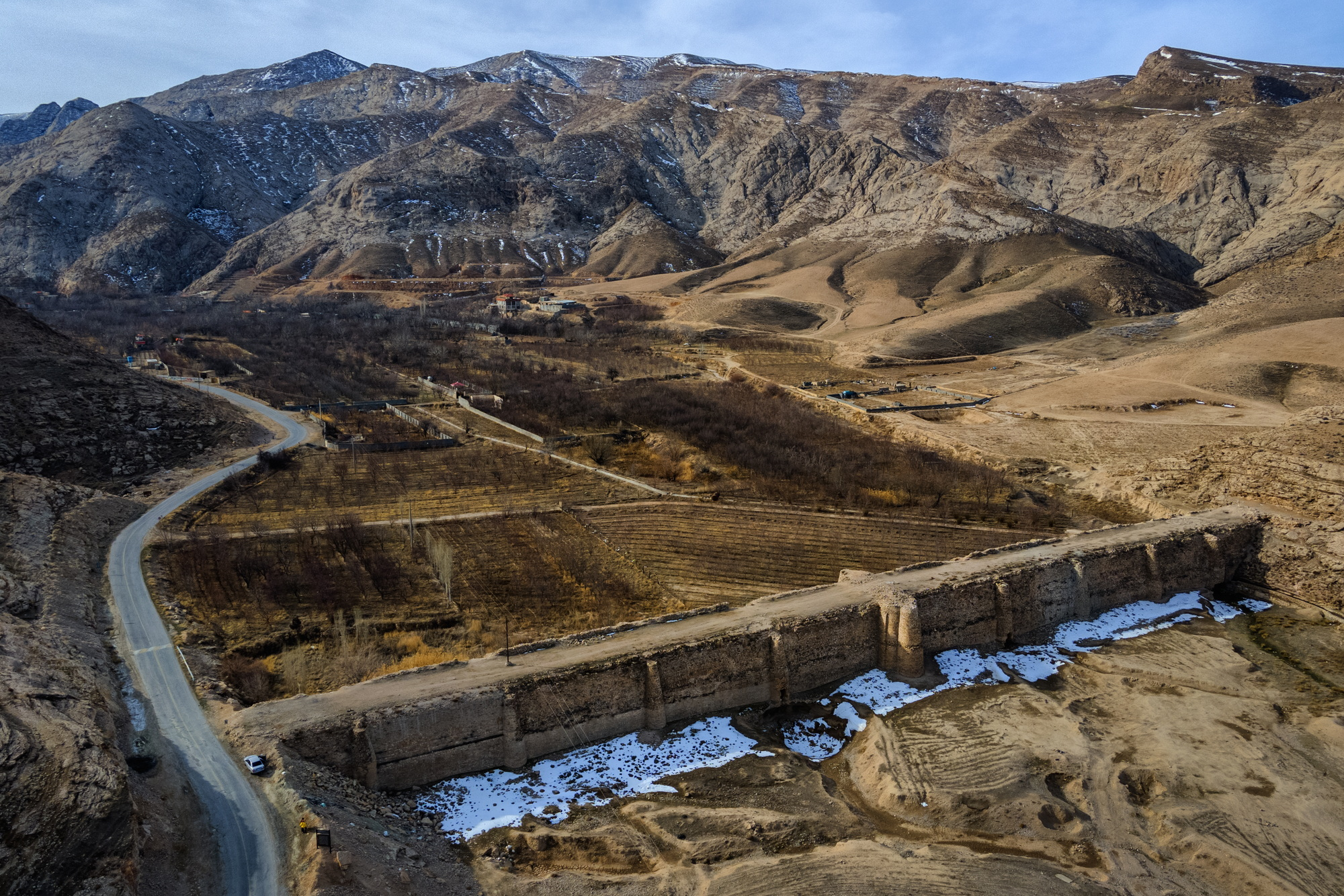
- Akhmad Dam

- Location of Chenaran County in Razavi Khorasan province (top center, purple)

- Location of Razavi Khorasan province in Iran
- Coordinates: 36°49′N 59°03′E
- Country: Iran
- Province: Razavi Khorasan
- Established: 1990
- Capital: Chenaran
- Districts: Central, Radkan, Seyyedabad

Area
  - Total: 2,073 km^{2} (800 sq mi)

Population (2016)
  - Total: 155,013
  - Density: 74.78/km^{2} (193.7/sq mi)
- Time zone: UTC+3:30 (IRST)

Chenaran County (Persian: شهرستان چناران) is in Razavi Khorasan province, Iran. Its capital is the city of Chenaran, about 45 km west of the city of Mashhad.

== History ==
The village of Golmakan was converted to a city in 2007. The new city of Golbahar was formed in 2014.

In 2020, Radkan Rural District was separated from the Central District in the formation of Radkan District, including the new Ghiasabad Rural District. Seyyedabad District was formed and divided into the new Hakimabad and Seyyedabad Rural Districts. In addition, Golbahar District was separated from the county in the establishment of Golbahar County. The village of Seyyedabad was converted to a city in the same year.

== Demographics ==
=== Population ===
At the time of the 2006 census, the county's population was 108,533 in 26,937 households. The following census in 2011 counted 125,601 people in 34,477 households. The 2016 census measured the population of the county as 155,013 in 45,105 households.

=== Administrative divisions ===
Chenaran County's population history and administrative structure over three consecutive censuses are shown in the following table.

Chenaran County Population
Administrative Divisions	2006	2011	2016
Central District	73,977	84,770	88,581
Boq Mej RD	3,945	3,142	3,270
Chenaran RD	17,109	18,153	16,946
Radkan RD	11,188	14,908	14,486
Chenaran (city)	41,735	48,567	53,879
Golbahar District (Note: Transferred to Golbahar County after the 2016 census)	34,556	40,785	66,321
Bizaki RD	11,740	10,885	12,134
Golmakan RD	22,816	20,366	8,937
Golbahar (city)			36,877
Golmakan (city)		9,534	8,373
Radkan District (Note: Established after the 2016 census)			
Ghiasabad RD			
Radkan RD			
Seyyedabad District			
Hakimabad RD			
Seyyedabad RD			
Seyyedabad (city) (Note: Became a city after the 2016 census)			
Total	108,533	125,601	155,013
RD = Rural District

== Economy ==
An agricultural county, Chenaran has been recently developing industries as well, especially in the industrial area of the city to the south. The common sport of the city is wrestling. There are many farms in the outskirts of the city.

== See also ==
Media related to Chenaran County at Wikimedia Commons
