= Bahman (disambiguation) =

Bahman is the 11th month of the year in Zoroastrian and Iranian calendars, named after a Zoroastrian concept.

Bahman may also refer to:

== Places ==
=== Iran ===
==== Fars province ====
- Bahman, Fars, a city in Abadeh County, Fars province, Iran
- Bahman and Soghad District, an administrative division of Abadeh County, Fars province, Iran
- Bahman Rural District, an administrative division of Abadeh County, Fars province, Iran
- Deh Now-ye Bahman, a village in Mamasani County, Fars province, Iran

==== Razavi Khorasan province ====
- Aliabad-e Bahman Jan, a village in Chenaran County, Razavi Khorasan province, Iran
- Bahman, Iran, a village in Razavi Khorasan province, Iran

==== Kohguliyeh and Boyer-Ahmad province ====
- Bahman Gazali, a village in Boyer-Ahmad County, Kohgiluyeh and Boyer-Ahmad province, Iran
- Bahman Yari, a village in Charam County, Kohgiluyeh and Boyer-Ahmad province, Iran

==== Other provinces ====
- Aqbolagh-e Bahman, a village in Sarab County, East Azerbaijan province, Iran
- Bahman Cultural Center in Tehran, Iran
- Bahman District, a district in Yazd province, Iran
- Bahman Jan, various places in Iran
- Bahman, Zanjan, a village in Zanjan province, Iran
- Qaleh Bahman, various places in Iran
- Qeshlaq-e Bahman Shir, a village in Parsabad County, Ardabil province, Iran

=== Yemen ===
- Bahman, Yemen, a village in west-central Yemen

== Sports ==
- Bahman F.C., a now-defunct football club of Tehran, Iran
- Bahman Shiraz F.C., a football club of Shiraz, Iran

== Other uses ==
- Vohu Manah, the Zoroastrian Amesha Spenta (or Good Purpose), also known as Bahman
- Kay Bahman, a mythological king of Iran
- Bahman (name), people with the name

== See also ==
- Bahmani, Iran (disambiguation)
- Bahmani Sultanate (c.1347–1527), in medieval southern India
- Bahmani–Vijayanagar War (disambiguation)
- Brahmin, Hindu varna (caste), also known as Bahman in Punjab
- Brahman, Hindu concept
