= Govareshkan =

Village in Razavi Khorasan province, Iran

Govareshkan Persian: گوارشكان
- Village
- Location within Iran
- Coordinates: 36°53′03″N 58°56′31″E
- Country: Iran
- Province: Razavi Khorasan
- County: Chenaran
- District: Seyyedabad
- Rural District: Hakimabad

Population (2016)
  - Total: 180
- Time zone: UTC+3:30 (IRST)

Govareshkan (Persian: گوارشكان) (Note: Also romanized as Gavareshkan, Gavāreshkan, and Govāreshkan; also known as Gavāreshgan) is a village in Hakimabad Rural District of Seyyedabad District in Chenaran County, Razavi Khorasan province, Iran.

== Demographics ==
=== Population ===
At the time of the 2006 National Census, the village's population was 138 in 37 households, when it was in Radkan Rural District of the Central District. The following census in 2011 counted 121 people in 42 households. The 2016 census measured the population of the village as 180 people in 58 households.

In 2020, the rural district was separated from the district in the formation of Radkan District, and Govareshkan was transferred to Hakimabad Rural District created in the new Seyyedabad District.
