= Cham Gard =

Village in Razavi Khorasan province, Iran

Cham Gard Persian: چمگرد
- Village
- Location within Iran
- Coordinates: 36°51′55″N 58°53′58″E
- Country: Iran
- Province: Razavi Khorasan
- County: Chenaran
- District: Seyyedabad
- Rural District: Hakimabad

Population (2016)
  - Total: 366
- Time zone: UTC+3:30 (IRST)

Cham Gard (Persian: چمگرد) is a village in Hakimabad Rural District of Seyyedabad District in Chenaran County, Razavi Khorasan province, Iran.

== Demographics ==
=== Population ===
At the time of the 2006 National Census, the village's population was 437 in 101 households, when it was in Radkan Rural District of the Central District. The following census in 2011 counted 284 people in 87 households. The 2016 census measured the population of the village as 366 people in 113 households.

In 2020, the rural district was separated from the district in the formation of Radkan District, and Cham Gard was transferred to Hakimabad Rural District created in the new Seyyedabad District.
