= Kalateh-ye Jafar =

Village in Razavi Khorasan province, Iran

Kalateh-ye Jafar Persian: كلاته جعفر
- Village
- Location within Iran
- Coordinates: 36°46′30″N 58°58′43″E
- Country: Iran
- Province: Razavi Khorasan
- County: Chenaran
- District: Seyyedabad
- Rural District: Hakimabad

Population (2016)
  - Total: 47
- Time zone: UTC+3:30 (IRST)

Kalateh-ye Jafar (Persian: كلاته جعفر) (Note: Also romanized as Kalāteh-ye Jaʿfar) is a village in Hakimabad Rural District of Seyyedabad District in Chenaran County, Razavi Khorasan province, Iran.

== Demographics ==
=== Population ===
At the time of the 2006 National Census, the village's population was 60 in 14 households, when it was in Radkan Rural District of the Central District. The following census in 2011 counted 71 people in 16 households. The 2016 census measured the population of the village as 47 people in 15 households.

In 2020, the rural district was separated from the district in the formation of Radkan District, and Kalateh-ye Jafar was transferred to Hakimabad Rural District created in the new Seyyedabad District.
