= Hakimabad, Chenaran =

Village in Razavi Khorasan province, Iran

Hakimabad Persian: حكيم اباد
- Village
- Location within Iran
- Coordinates: 36°47′23″N 58°54′14″E
- Country: Iran
- Province: Razavi Khorasan
- County: Chenaran
- District: Seyyedabad
- Rural District: Hakimabad

Population (2016)
  - Total: 771
- Time zone: UTC+3:30 (IRST)

Hakimabad (Persian: حكيم اباد) (Note: Also romanized as Hakīm Ābād and Ḩakīmābād; also known as Akīm Ābad) is a village in, and the capital of, Hakimabad Rural District in Seyyedabad District of Chenaran County, Razavi Khorasan province, Iran.

== Demographics ==
=== Population ===
At the time of the 2006 National Census, the village's population was 942 in 220 households, when it was in Radkan Rural District of the Central District. The following census in 2011 counted 815 people in 239 households. The 2016 census measured the population of the village as 771 people in 234 households.

In 2020, the rural district was separated from the district in the formation of Radkan District, and Hakimabad was transferred to Hakimabad Rural District created in the new Seyyedabad District.
