= Beyram Shah =

Village in Razavi Khorasan province, Iran

Beyram Shah Persian: بيرمشاه
- Village
- Location within Iran
- Coordinates: 36°47′09″N 58°54′53″E
- Country: Iran
- Province: Razavi Khorasan
- County: Chenaran
- District: Seyyedabad
- Rural District: Hakimabad

Population (2016)
  - Total: 82
- Time zone: UTC+3:30 (IRST)

Beyram Shah (Persian: بيرمشاه) (Note: Also romanized as Beyram Shāh) is a village in Hakimabad Rural District of Seyyedabad District in Chenaran County, Razavi Khorasan province, Iran.

== Demographics ==
=== Population ===
At the time of the 2006 National Census, the village's population was 109 in 22 households, when it was in Radkan Rural District of the Central District. The following census in 2011 counted 96 people in 24 households. The 2016 census measured the population of the village as 82 people in 21 households.

In 2020, the rural district was separated from the district in the formation of Radkan District, and Beyram Shah was transferred to Hakimabad Rural District created in the new Seyyedabad District.
