= Bahman (name) =

Bahman (Persian: بهمن) is a Persian given name and surname, derived from the name of the eleventh month of the Solar Hijri calendar.

People with the name include:

== Given name ==
- Bahman Akhundov (1910–1980), Azerbaijani Soviet economist
- Bahman Ahmadi Amouee (born 1967), Iranian journalist
- Bahman Asgari (born 1991), Iranian karateka
- Amir-Bahman Bagheri, Iranian military officer
- Bahman Daroshafaei, Iranian-British journalist, translator, blogger and filmmaker
- Bahman Farmanara (born 1942), Iranian film director, screenwriter and producer
- Bahman Foroutan (born 1947), Iranian football manager
- Bahman Forsi (born 1934), Iranian playwright
- Bahman Ghobadi (born 1969), Iranian film director
- Bahman Golbarnezhad (1968–2016), Iranian Paralympic cyclist
- Bahman Hashemi (born 1962), Iranian TV presenter and actor
- Bahman Kiarostami (born 1978), Iranian filmmaker
- Bahman Jaduya (died 636), Iranian general of the Sasanians
- Bahman Jahantigh (born 1995), Iranian footballer
- Bahman Jalali (1944–2010) Iranian photographer
- Bahman Kamel (born 1986), Iranian footballer
- Bahman Koohestani, former executive at Netscape
- Bahman Maghsoudlou (born 1946), Iranian film scholar, author, film director and producer
- Bahman Maleki (born 1992), Iranian footballer
- Bahman Mehabadi, Iranian violinist, music teacher and composer
- Bahman Mirza (1810–1883/84), Qajar prince, literary scholar and author
- Bahman Mofid (1942–2020), Iranian theater actor, poet, singer and ballet dancer
- Bahman Amiri Moghaddam (born 1962), Iranian soldier and former governor
- Bahman Mohammadi (born 1957), Iranian politician
- Bahman Mohasses (1931–2010), Iranian artist, translator and theater director
- Bahman Motamedian, Iranian filmmaker, photographer, author and screenwriter
- Bahman Nassim (1940–1980), Iranian swimmer
- Bahman Nirumand (born 1936), Iranian-German journalist and author
- Bahman Reyhani, Iranian military officer
- Bahman Salari (born 1993), Iranian footballer
- Bahman Salehnia (1939–2025), Iranian football manager
- Bahman Shirazi, former director of graduate studies at California Institute of Integral Studies
- Bahman Shirvani (born 1989), Iranian footballer
- Bahman Sholevar (born 1941), Iranian-American author, translator, critic, psychiatrist and political activist
- Bahman Tahmasebi (born 1980), Iranian former footballer
- Bahman Vafaeinejad (born 1968), known as Benny Rebel, Iranian-German photographer
- Jamshid Bahman Jamshidian (1851–1933), Iranian banker and politician

== Surname ==
- Ala-ud-Din Bahman Shah (died 1358), founder of the Bahmani Sultanate
- Ali Akbar Bahman (1883–1967), Qajar and Pahlavi diplomat and politician
- Deep Chand Bahman, Indian poet, actor and dancer
- Jasem Bahman (born 1958), Kuwaiti former footballer

== See also ==
- Kay Bahman, figure in Iranian folklore
  - Bahman-nameh, Persian epic poem on Kay Bahman
- Bahman (disambiguation)
