= Hajjiabad, Chenaran =

Village in Razavi Khorasan province, Iran

Hajjiabad Persian: حاجي اباد
- Village
- Location within Iran
- Coordinates: 36°48′05″N 58°54′39″E
- Country: Iran
- Province: Razavi Khorasan
- County: Chenaran
- District: Seyyedabad
- Rural District: Hakimabad

Population (2016)
  - Total: 158
- Time zone: UTC+3:30 (IRST)

Hajjiabad (Persian: حاجي اباد) (Note: Also romanized as Ḩājjīābād) is a village in Hakimabad Rural District of Seyyedabad District in Chenaran County, Razavi Khorasan province, Iran.

== Demographics ==
=== Population ===
At the time of the 2006 National Census, the village's population was 147 in 36 households, when it was in Radkan Rural District of the Central District. The following census in 2011 counted 118 people in 34 households. The 2016 census measured the population of the village as 158 people in 51 households.

In 2020, the rural district was separated from the district in the formation of Radkan District, and Hajjiabad was transferred to Hakimabad Rural District created in the new Seyyedabad District.
