= Bahmani, Iran =

Bahmani or Behmani (Persian: بهمني), in Iran, may refer to:

- Bahmani, Fasa, Fars Province
- Bahmani, Larestan, Fars Province
- Bahmani, Sepidan, Fars Province
- Bahmani, Bandar Lengeh, Hormozgan Province
- Bahmani, Minab, Hormozgan Province
- Bahmani, Markazi

== See also ==
- Bahman (disambiguation)
- Bahmani Sultanate (c.1347–1527), in medieval southern India
- Bahmani–Vijayanagar War (disambiguation)
