= Muchenan =

Village in Razavi Khorasan province, Iran

Muchenan Persian: موچنان
- Village
- Location within Iran
- Coordinates: 36°54′35″N 58°51′07″E
- Country: Iran
- Province: Razavi Khorasan
- County: Chenaran
- District: Seyyedabad
- Rural District: Hakimabad

Population (2016)
  - Total: 2,043
- Time zone: UTC+3:30 (IRST)

Muchenan (Persian: موچنان) (Note: Also romanized as Mouchenan and Mūchenān; also known as Mūkhīān and Mūkhīyān) is a village in Hakimabad Rural District of Seyyedabad District in Chenaran County, Razavi Khorasan province, Iran.

== Demographics ==
=== Population ===
At the time of the 2006 National Census, the village's population was 2,057 in 503 households, when it was in Radkan Rural District of the Central District. The following census in 2011 counted 2,040 people in 576 households. The 2016 census measured the population of the village as 2,043 people in 591 households.

In 2020, the rural district was separated from the district in the formation of Radkan District, and Muchenan was transferred to Hakimabad Rural District created in the new Seyyedabad District.
