= Sowhan, Razavi Khorasan =

Village in Razavi Khorasan province, Iran

Sowhan Persian: سوهان
- Village
- Location within Iran
- Coordinates: 36°52′30″N 58°55′20″E
- Country: Iran
- Province: Razavi Khorasan
- County: Chenaran
- District: Seyyedabad
- Rural District: Hakimabad

Population (2016)
  - Total: 235
- Time zone: UTC+3:30 (IRST)

Sowhan (Persian: سوهان) (Note: Also romanized as Sowhān; also known as Sohān) is a village in Hakimabad Rural District of Seyyedabad District in Chenaran County, Razavi Khorasan province, Iran.

== Demographics ==
=== Population ===
At the time of the 2006 National Census, the village's population was 253 in 57 households, when it was in Radkan Rural District of the Central District. The following census in 2011 counted 188 people in 60 households. The 2016 census measured the population of the village as 235 people in 78 households.

In 2020, the rural district was separated from the district in the formation of Radkan District, and Sowhan was transferred to Hakimabad Rural District created in the new Seyyedabad District.
