= Abgahi =

Village in Razavi Khorasan province, Iran

Abgahi Persian: ابگاهي
- Village
- Location within Iran
- Coordinates: 36°55′13″N 59°03′15″E
- Country: Iran
- Province: Razavi Khorasan
- County: Chenaran
- District: Seyyedabad
- Rural District: Hakimabad

Population (2016)
  - Total: 107
- Time zone: UTC+3:30 (IRST)

Abgahi (Persian: ابگاهي) (Note: Also romanized as Ābgāhī; also known as Ābkāhī) is a village in Hakimabad Rural District of Seyyedabad District in Chenaran County, Razavi Khorasan province, Iran.

== Demographics ==
=== Population ===
At the time of the 2006 National Census, the village's population was 101 in 27 households, when it was in Radkan Rural District of the Central District. The following census in 2011 counted 87 people in 25 households. The 2016 census measured the population of the village as 107 people in 34 households.

In 2020, the rural district was separated from the district in the formation of Radkan District, and Abgahi was transferred to Hakimabad Rural District created in the new Seyyedabad District.
