= Rezaabad-e Gijan Samedi =

Village in Razavi Khorasan province, Iran

Rezaabad-e Gijan Samedi Persian: رضاابادگيجان سامدي
- Village
- Location within Iran
- Coordinates: 36°48′22″N 59°05′44″E
- Country: Iran
- Province: Razavi Khorasan
- County: Chenaran
- District: Radkan
- Rural District: Ghiasabad

Population (2016)
  - Total: Below reporting threshold
- Time zone: UTC+3:30 (IRST)

Rezaabad-e Gijan Samedi (Persian: رضاابادگيجان سامدي) (Note: Also romanized as Reẕāābād-e Gījān Sāmedī; also known as Reẕāābād-e Gījān) is a village in Ghiasabad Rural District of Radkan District in Chenaran County, Razavi Khorasan province, Iran.

== Demographics ==
=== Population ===
At the time of the 2006 National Census, the village's population was 15 in five households, when it was in Radkan Rural District of the Central District. The following censuses in 2011 and 2016 counted a population below the reporting threshold.

In 2020, the rural district was separated from the district in the formation of Radkan District, and Rezaabad-e Gijan Samedi was transferred to Ghiasabad Rural District created in the new district.
