= Qezel Kan =

Village in Razavi Khorasan province, Iran

Qezel Kan Persian: قزل كن
- Village
- Location within Iran
- Coordinates: 36°45′30″N 58°55′46″E
- Country: Iran
- Province: Razavi Khorasan
- County: Chenaran
- District: Seyyedabad
- Rural District: Hakimabad

Population (2016)
  - Total: 898
- Time zone: UTC+3:30 (IRST)

Qezel Kan (Persian: قزل كن) (Note: Also known as Qezel Kand) is a village in Hakimabad Rural District of Seyyedabad District in Chenaran County, Razavi Khorasan province, Iran.

== Demographics ==
=== Population ===
At the time of the 2006 National Census, the village's population was 821 in 175 households, when it was in Chenaran Rural District of the Central District. The following census in 2011 counted 846 people in 211 households. The 2016 census measured the population of the village as 898 people in 234 households.

In 2020, Qezel Kan was separated from the district in the formation of Seyyedabad District and transferred to Hakimabad Rural District created in the new district.
