= Aliabad, Chenaran =

Village in Razavi Khorasan province, Iran

Aliabad Persian: علي اباد
- Village
- Location within Iran
- Coordinates: 36°46′08″N 59°05′09″E
- Country: Iran
- Province: Razavi Khorasan
- County: Chenaran
- District: Radkan
- Rural District: Ghiasabad

Population (2016)
  - Total: 65
- Time zone: UTC+3:30 (IRST)

Aliabad (Persian: علي اباد) (Note: Also romanized as ‘Alīābād) is a village in Ghiasabad Rural District of Radkan District, Chenaran County, Razavi Khorasan province, Iran.

== Demographics ==
=== Population ===
At the time of the 2006 National Census, the village's population was 88 in 25 households, when it was in Radkan Rural District of the Central District. The following census in 2011 counted 83 people in 26 households. The 2016 census measured the population of the village as 65 people in 23 households.

In 2020, the rural district was separated from the district in the formation of Radkan District, and Aliabad was transferred to Ghiasabad Rural District created in the new district.
