= Sheykh Kanlu, Chenaran =

Village in Razavi Khorasan province, Iran

Sheykh Kanlu Persian: شيخ كانلو
- Village
- Location within Iran
- Coordinates: 36°43′04″N 59°00′27″E
- Country: Iran
- Province: Razavi Khorasan
- County: Chenaran
- District: Seyyedabad
- Rural District: Seyyedabad

Population (2016)
  - Total: 567
- Time zone: UTC+3:30 (IRST)

Sheykh Kanlu (Persian: شيخ كانلو) (Note: Also romanized as Sheykh Kānlū; also known as Sheykh Khanlu and Sheykh Khānlū) is a village in Seyyedabad Rural District of Seyyedabad District in Chenaran County, Razavi Khorasan province, Iran.

== Demographics ==
=== Population ===
At the time of the 2006 National Census, the village's population was 666 in 152 households, when it was in Chenaran Rural District of the Central District. The following census in 2011 counted 699 people in 192 households. The 2016 census measured the population of the village as 567 people in 166 households.

In 2020, Sheykh Kanlu was separated from the district in the formation of Seyyedabad District and transferred to Seyyedabad Rural District created in the new district.
