= Aliabad-e Bahman Jan =

Village in Razavi Khorasan province, Iran

Aliabad-e Bahman Jan Persian: علي ابادبهمن جان
- Village
- Location within Iran
- Coordinates: 36°50′13″N 58°55′36″E
- Country: Iran
- Province: Razavi Khorasan
- County: Chenaran
- District: Seyyedabad
- Rural District: Hakimabad

Population (2016)
  - Total: 99
- Time zone: UTC+3:30 (IRST)

Aliabad-e Bahman Jan (Persian: علي ابادبهمن جان) (Note: Also romanized as ‘Alīābād-e Bahman Jān) is a village in Hakimabad Rural District of Seyyedabad District in Chenaran County, Razavi Khorasan province, Iran.

== Demographics ==
=== Population ===
At the time of the 2006 National Census, the village's population was 128 in 28 households, when it was in Radkan Rural District of the Central District. The following census in 2011 counted 126 people in 29 households. The 2016 census measured the population of the village as 99 people in 23 households.

In 2020, the rural district was separated from the district in the formation of Radkan District, and Aliabad-e Bahman Jan was transferred to Hakimabad Rural District created in the new Seyyedabad District.
