= Chahar Mahan =

Village in Razavi Khorasan province, Iran

Chahar Mahan Persian: چهارمهن
- Village
- Location within Iran
- Coordinates: 36°43′24″N 58°59′05″E
- Country: Iran
- Province: Razavi Khorasan
- County: Chenaran
- District: Seyyedabad
- Rural District: Seyyedabad

Population (2016)
  - Total: 370
- Time zone: UTC+3:30 (IRST)

Chahar Mahan (Persian: چهارمهن) (Note: Also romanized as Chahār Mahan) is a village in, and the capital of, Seyyedabad Rural District in Seyyedabad District of Chenaran County, Razavi Khorasan province, Iran.

== Demographics ==
=== Population ===
At the time of the 2006 National Census, the village's population was 402 in 98 households, when it was in Chenaran Rural District of the Central District. The following census in 2011 counted 385 people in 97 households. The 2016 census measured the population of the village as 370 people in 111 households.

In 2020, Chahar Mahan was separated from the district in the formation of Seyyedabad District and transferred to Seyyedabad Rural District created in the new district.
