= Qiasabad, Razavi Khorasan =

Village in Razavi Khorasan province, Iran

Qiasabad Persian: قياس‌آباد
- Village
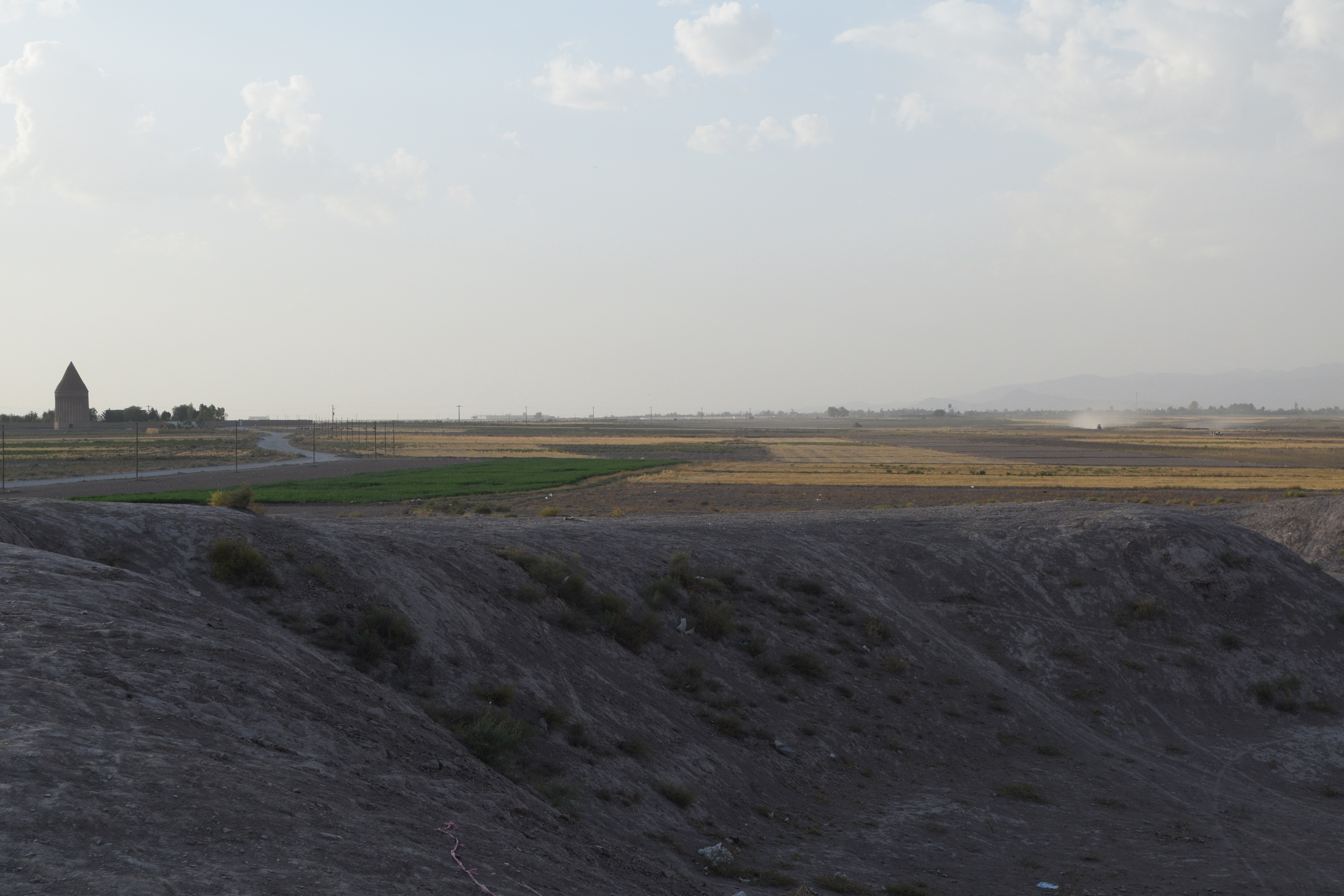
- Fields in the village of Qiasabad

- Location within Iran
- Coordinates: 36°46′05″N 59°02′39″E
- Country: Iran
- Province: Razavi Khorasan
- County: Chenaran
- District: Radkan
- Rural District: Ghiasabad

Population (2016)
  - Total: 1,302
- Time zone: UTC+3:30 (IRST)

Qiasabad (Persian: قياس‌آباد) (Note: Also romanized as Qīāsābād; also known as Gheys̄ābād and Ghīāsābād) is a village in, and the capital of, Ghiasabad Rural District in Radkan District of Chenaran County, Razavi Khorasan province, Iran.

== Demographics ==
=== Population ===
At the time of the 2006 National Census, the village's population was 1,190 in 298 households, when it was in Radkan Rural District of the Central District. The following census in 2011 counted 1,296 people in 367 households. The 2016 census measured the population of the village as 1,302 people in 395 households.

In 2020, the rural district was separated from the district in the formation of Radkan District, and Qiasabad was transferred to Ghiasabad Rural District created in the new district.
