= Gaveh =

Gaveh (Persian: گاوه) may refer to:

- Gaveh-ye Kalateh, Razavi Khorasan Province
- Gaveh-ye Khalseh, Razavi Khorasan Province
- Gaveh, Khusf, South Khorasan Province
- Gaveh, Nehbandan, South Khorasan Province
- Gaveh, Sistan and Baluchestan
