= Mohammadabad, Chenaran =

Village in Razavi Khorasan province, Iran

Mohammadabad Persian: محمداباد
- Village
- Location within Iran
- Coordinates: 36°43′21″N 58°59′54″E
- Country: Iran
- Province: Razavi Khorasan
- County: Chenaran
- District: Seyyedabad
- Rural District: Seyyedabad

Population (2016)
  - Total: 213
- Time zone: UTC+3:30 (IRST)

Mohammadabad (Persian: محمداباد) (Note: Also romanized as Moḩammadābād) is a village in Seyyedabad Rural District of Seyyedabad District in Chenaran County, Razavi Khorasan province, Iran.

== Demographics ==
=== Population ===
At the time of the 2006 National Census, the village's population was 320 in 84 households, when it was in Chenaran Rural District of the Central District. The following census in 2011 counted 236 people in 69 households. The 2016 census measured the population of the village as 213 people in 70 households.

In 2020, Mohammadabad was separated from the district in the formation of Seyyedabad District and transferred to Seyyedabad Rural District created in the new district.
