= Akhlamad =

Akhlamad (Persian: اخلمد) may refer to several villages in Chenaran Rural District, Central District of Chenaran County, Razavi Khorasan Province, Iran:

- Akhlamad-e Olya
- Akhlamad-e Sofla
- Dahaneh-ye Akhlamad
