= Seyyedabad, Chenaran =

City in Razavi Khorasan province, Iran

Seyyedabad Persian: سيداباد
- City
- Location within Iran
- Coordinates: 36°44′51″N 58°57′19″E
- Country: Iran
- Province: Razavi Khorasan
- County: Chenaran
- District: Seyyedabad
- Established as a city: 2020

Population (2016)
  - Total: 5,312
- Time zone: UTC+3:30 (IRST)

Seyyedabad (Persian: سيداباد) (Note: Also romanized as Seyyedābād; also known as Saiyidābād) is a city in, and the capital of, Seyyedabad District in Chenaran County, Razavi Khorasan province, Iran.

== Demographics ==
=== Population ===
At the time of the 2006 National Census, Seyyedabad's population was 4,870 in 1,206 households, when it was a village in Chenaran Rural District of the Central District. The following census in 2011 counted 6,743 people in 1,839 households. The 2016 census measured the population of the village as 5,312 people in 1,564 households. It was the most populous village in its rural district.

In 2020, Seyyedabad was separated from the district in the formation of Seyyedabad District and transferred to Seyyedabad Rural District created in the new district. The village was converted to a city in 2020.
