= Tolki =

Tolki تلكي
- Village
- Location within Iran
- Coordinates: 36°42′35″N 59°02′18″E
- Country: Iran
- Province: Razavi Khorasan
- County: Chenaran
- Bakhsh: Central
- Rural District: Chenaran

Population (2006)
  - Total: 183
- Time zone: UTC+3:30 (IRST)

Tolki (Persian: تلكي, also Romanized as Tolkī) is a village in Chenaran Rural District, in the Central District of Chenaran County, Razavi Khorasan Province, Iran. At the 2006 census, its population was 183, in 41 families.
