= Moghan, Chenaran =

Village in Razavi Khorasan province, Iran

Moghan Persian: مغان
- Village
- Location within Iran
- Coordinates: 36°47′45″N 59°02′08″E
- Country: Iran
- Province: Razavi Khorasan
- County: Chenaran
- District: Radkan
- Rural District: Radkan

Population (2016)
  - Total: 384
- Time zone: UTC+3:30 (IRST)

Moghan (Persian: مغان) (Note: Also romanized as Maghān and Moghān; also known as Mogham) is a village in Radkan Rural District of Radkan District in Chenaran County, Razavi Khorasan province, Iran.

== Demographics ==
=== Population ===
At the time of the 2006 National Census, the village's population was 467 in 111 households, when it was in the Central District. The following census in 2011 counted 403 people in 104 households. The 2016 census measured the population of the village as 384 people in 121 households.

In 2020, the rural district was separated from the district in the formation of Radkan District.
