= Qezel Hesar, Chenaran =

Village in Razavi Khorasan province, Iran

Qezel Hesar Persian: قزل حصار
- Village
- Location within Iran
- Coordinates: 36°45′51″N 59°06′36″E
- Country: Iran
- Province: Razavi Khorasan
- County: Chenaran
- District: Radkan
- Rural District: Ghiasabad

Population (2016)
  - Total: 3,570
- Time zone: UTC+3:30 (IRST)

Qezel Hesar (Persian: قزل حصار) (Note: Also romanized as Qezel Ḩeṣār) is a village in Ghiasabad Rural District of Radkan District in Chenaran County, Razavi Khorasan province, Iran.

== Demographics ==
=== Population ===
At the time of the 2006 National Census, the village's population was 65 in 16 households, when it was in Radkan Rural District of the Central District. The following census in 2011 counted 3,051 people in 48 households. The 2016 census measured the population of the village as 3,570 people in 35 households, the most populous in its rural district.

In 2020, the rural district was separated from the district in the formation of Radkan District, and Qezel Hesar was transferred to Ghiasabad Rural District created in the new district.
