= Qadirabad, Razavi Khorasan =

Village in Razavi Khorasan province, Iran

Qadirabad Persian: قديراباد
- Village
- Location within Iran
- Country: Iran
- Province: Razavi Khorasan
- County: Chenaran
- District: Radkan
- Rural District: Radkan

Population (2016)
  - Total: 27
- Time zone: UTC+3:30 (IRST)

Qadirabad (Persian: قديراباد) (Note: Also romanized as Qadīrābād; also known as Ghadīrābād and Qadīnābād) is a village in Radkan Rural District of Radkan District in Chenaran County, Razavi Khorasan province, Iran.

== Demographics ==
=== Population ===
At the time of the 2006 National Census, the village's population was 54 in 12 households, when it was in the Central District. The following census in 2011 counted 49 people in 13 households. The 2016 census measured the population of the village as 27 people in eight households.

In 2020, the rural district was separated from the district in the formation of Radkan District.
