= Helal =

Helal هلال
- Village
- Location within Iran
- Coordinates: 36°42′47″N 59°04′19″E
- Country: Iran
- Province: Razavi Khorasan
- County: Chenaran
- Bakhsh: Central
- Rural District: Chenaran

Population (2006)
  - Total: 69
- Time zone: UTC+3:30 (IRST)

Helal (Persian: هلال, also Romanized as Helāl; also known as Helār) is a village in Chenaran Rural District, in the Central District of Chenaran County, Razavi Khorasan province, Iran. At the 2006 census, its population was 69, in 18 families.
