= Marichgan =

Village in Razavi Khorasan province, Iran

Marichgan Persian: مريچگان
- Village
- Location within Iran
- Coordinates: 36°55′58″N 59°03′03″E
- Country: Iran
- Province: Razavi Khorasan
- County: Chenaran
- District: Radkan
- Rural District: Radkan

Population (2016)
  - Total: 233
- Time zone: UTC+3:30 (IRST)

Marichgan (Persian: مريچگان) (Note: Also romanized as Marīchgān; also known as Marīchkān, Marjekān, Merījgān, Mīr Bajgān, and Mirījgān) is a village in, and the capital of, Radkan Rural District in Radkan District of Chenaran County, Razavi Khorasan province, Iran. The previous capital of the rural district was the village of Radkan.

== Demographics ==
=== Population ===
At the time of the 2006 National Census, the village's population was 198 in 51 households, when it was in the Central District. The following census in 2011 counted 111 people in 31 households. The 2016 census measured the population of the village as 233 people in 67 households.

In 2020, the rural district was separated from the district in the formation of Radkan District.
