= Qaleh Bahman =

Qaleh Bahman or Qaleh-ye Bahman (Persian: قلعه بهمن) may refer to:

- Qaleh-ye Bahman, Fars
- Qaleh Bahman, Isfahan
- Bahman Jan-e Sofla
- Qaleh-ye Bahman Jan-e Olya
