= Bahman Jan-e Olya =

Village in Razavi Khorasan province, Iran

Bahman Jan-e Olya Persian: بهمن جان عليا
- Village
- Location within Iran
- Coordinates: 36°54′09″N 58°58′33″E
- Country: Iran
- Province: Razavi Khorasan
- County: Chenaran
- District: Seyyedabad
- Rural District: Hakimabad

Population (2016)
  - Total: 232
- Time zone: UTC+3:30 (IRST)

Bahman Jan-e Olya (Persian: بهمن جان عليا) (Note: Also romanized as Bahman Jān-e ‘Olyā; also known as Bahman Jān, Bahmanjān-e Bālā, Qal‘eh-ye Bahman Jān, and Qal‘eh-ye Bahman Jān-e ‘Olyā) is a village in Hakimabad Rural District of Seyyedabad District in Chenaran County, Razavi Khorasan province, Iran.

== Demographics ==
=== Population ===
At the time of the 2006 National Census, the village's population was 423 in 109 households, when it was in Radkan Rural District of the Central District. The following census in 2011 counted 376 people in 112 households. The 2016 census measured the population of the village as 232 people in 83 households.

In 2020, the rural district was separated from the district in the formation of Radkan District, and Bahman Jan-e Olya was transferred to Hakimabad Rural District created in the new Seyyedabad District.
