= Bijerk =

Bijerk بيجرك
- Village
- Country: Iran
- Province: Razavi Khorasan
- County: Chenaran
- Bakhsh: Central
- Rural District: Chenaran

Population (2006)
  - Total: 43
- Time zone: UTC+3:30 (IRST)

Bijerk (Persian: بيجرك, also Romanized as Bījerḵ) is a village in Chenaran Rural District, in the Central District of Chenaran County, Razavi Khorasan Province, Iran. At the 2006 census, its population was 43, in 11 families.
