= Nahrabad =

Nahrabad نهراباد
- Village
- Location within Iran
- Coordinates: 36°42′49″N 59°11′53″E
- Country: Iran
- Province: Razavi Khorasan
- County: Chenaran
- Bakhsh: Central
- Rural District: Chenaran

Population (2006)
  - Total: 172
- Time zone: UTC+3:30 (IRST)
  - Summer (DST): UTC+4:30 (IRDT)

Nahrabad (Persian: نهراباد, also Romanized as Nahrābād) is a village in Chenaran Rural District, in the Central District of Chenaran County, Razavi Khorasan Province, Iran. At the 2006 census, its population was 172, in 44 families.
