= Kalateh-ye Mian, Chenaran =

Kalateh-ye Mian كلاته ميان
- Village
- Location within Iran
- Coordinates: 36°40′15″N 59°07′25″E
- Country: Iran
- Province: Razavi Khorasan
- County: Chenaran
- Bakhsh: Central
- Rural District: Chenaran

Population (2006)
  - Total: 64
- Time zone: UTC+3:30 (IRST)
  - Summer (DST): UTC+4:30 (IRDT)

Kalateh-ye Mian (Persian: كلاته ميان, also Romanized as Kalāteh-ye Mīān) is a village in Chenaran Rural District, in the Central District of Chenaran County, Razavi Khorasan Province, Iran. At the 2006 census, its population was 64, in 19 families.
