= Kharij, Iran =

Village in Razavi Khorasan province, Iran

Kharij Persian: خريج
- Village
- Location within Iran
- Coordinates: 36°51′22″N 58°58′18″E
- Country: Iran
- Province: Razavi Khorasan
- County: Chenaran
- District: Radkan
- Rural District: Radkan

Population (2016)
  - Total: 422
- Time zone: UTC+3:30 (IRST)

Kharij (Persian: خريج) (Note: Also romanized as Kharīj; also known as Kharach, Kharīch, and Khirch) is a village in Radkan Rural District of Radkan District in Chenaran County, Razavi Khorasan province, Iran.

== Demographics ==
=== Population ===
At the time of the 2006 National Census, the village's population was 361 in 95 households, when it was in the Central District. The following census in 2011 counted 347 people in 103 households. The 2016 census measured the population of the village as 422 people in 131 households.

In 2020, the rural district was separated from the district in the formation of Radkan District.
