= Qoroq, Razavi Khorasan =

Village in Razavi Khorasan province, Iran

Qoroq Persian: قرق
- Village
- Location within Iran
- Coordinates: 36°50′36″N 59°06′32″E
- Country: Iran
- Province: Razavi Khorasan
- County: Chenaran
- District: Radkan
- Rural District: Radkan

Population (2016)
  - Total: 230
- Time zone: UTC+3:30 (IRST)

Qoroq (Persian: قرق) is a village in Radkan Rural District of Radkan District in Chenaran County, Razavi Khorasan province, Iran.

== Demographics ==
=== Population ===
At the time of the 2006 National Census, the village's population was 235 in 61 households, when it was in the Central District. The following census in 2011 counted 241 people in 67 households. The 2016 census measured the population of the village as 230 people in 74 households.

In 2020, the rural district was separated from the district in the formation of Radkan District.
