= Zinger =

Zinger may refer to:

== Food ==
- Zingers, an American snack cake made by both Dolly Madison and Hostess
- A descriptor added to names of some tart varieties of teas made by Celestial Seasonings
- A Zinger Sandwich, a fried chicken sandwich with spicy seasoning, lettuce and spicy mayonnaise made by KFC

== People ==
- Paul Azinger, American professional golfer also known by the nickname Zinger
- Zinger (born 1990), stage name of Jung Hana, a South Korean rapper in girl group Secret
- Abraham Zinger (1864–1920), Imperial Russian writer
- Keith Zinger (born 1985), American football tight end
- Dwayne Zinger (born 1976), Canadian ice hockey player
- Pablo Zinger (born 1956), conductor, pianist, writer, composer, arranger, lecturer and narrator
- Vasily Jakovlevich Zinger (1836–1907), prominent Russian mathematician, botanist and philosopher
- Viktor Zinger (1941–2013), retired ice hockey player
- Yisrael Zinger (born 1948), Israel politician

== Other ==
- Zinger, flying enemies present in the Donkey Kong series of video games
- Zinger, Iran, a village in Razavi Khorasan Province, Iran
- Weekly cabaret listing in Londonist
- Mitsubishi Zinger, a crossover SUV sold in Taiwan and some Asian countries
- Image artefacts in reconstructed X-ray crystallography data, due to high energy particles impacting fiber optics associated with imaging CCD detectors.
- The Zinger, a 1975 rock musical by Harry Chapin
