= Kambalan =

Kambalan كمبلان
- Village
- Location within Iran
- Coordinates: 36°40′04″N 59°06′27″E
- Country: Iran
- Province: Razavi Khorasan
- County: Chenaran
- Bakhsh: Central
- Rural District: Chenaran

Population (2006)
  - Total: 320
- Time zone: UTC+3:30 (IRST)

Kambalan (Persian: كمبلان, also Romanized as Kambalān and Kombolān) is a village in Chenaran Rural District, in the Central District of Chenaran County, Razavi Khorasan Province, Iran. At the 2006 census, its population was 320, in 72 families.
