= Emamzadeh Ebrahim, Razavi Khorasan =

Village in Razavi Khorasan province, Iran

Emamzadeh Ebrahim Persian: امامزاده ابراهيم
- Village
- Location within Iran
- Country: Iran
- Province: Razavi Khorasan
- County: Chenaran
- District: Radkan
- Rural District: Radkan

Population (2016)
  - Total: 17
- Time zone: UTC+3:30 (IRST)

Emamzadeh Ebrahim (Persian: امامزاده ابراهيم) (Note: Also romanized as Emāmzādeh Ebrāhīm) is a village in Radkan Rural District of Radkan District in Chenaran County, Razavi Khorasan province, Iran.

== Demographics ==
=== Population ===
At the time of the 2006 National Census, the village's population was 22 in six households, when it was in the Central District. The following census in 2011 counted a population below the reporting threshold. The 2016 census measured the population of the village as 17 people in six households.

In 2020, the rural district was separated from the district in the formation of Radkan District.
