= Yurd Chupan =

Yurd Chupan يوردچوپان
- Village
- Location within Iran
- Coordinates: 36°40′06″N 59°04′35″E
- Country: Iran
- Province: Razavi Khorasan
- County: Chenaran
- Bakhsh: Central
- Rural District: Chenaran

Population (2006)
  - Total: 322
- Time zone: UTC+3:30 (IRST)
  - Summer (DST): UTC+4:30 (IRDT)

Yurd Chupan (Persian: يوردچوپان, also Romanized as Yūrd Chūpān and Yūrt Chūpān; also known as Būrt Chūpān) is a village in Chenaran Rural District, in the Central District of Chenaran County, Razavi Khorasan Province, Iran. At the 2006 census, its population was 322, in 74 families.
