= Qol Quchan =

Qol Quchan قلقوچان
- Village
- Location within Iran
- Coordinates: 36°39′46″N 59°05′11″E
- Country: Iran
- Province: Razavi Khorasan
- County: Chenaran
- Bakhsh: Central
- Rural District: Chenaran

Population (2006)
  - Total: 287
- Time zone: UTC+3:30 (IRST)
  - Summer (DST): UTC+4:30 (IRDT)

Qol Quchan (Persian: قلقوچان, also Romanized as Qol Qūchān, Ghelghoochan, and Qalqūchān) is a village in Chenaran Rural District, in the Central District of Chenaran County, Razavi Khorasan Province, Iran. At the 2006 census, its population was 287, in 75 families.
