= Bahman Jan-e Sofla =

Village in Razavi Khorasan province, Iran

Bahman Jan-e Sofla Persian: بهمن جان سفلي
- Village
- Location within Iran
- Coordinates: 36°52′08″N 58°56′31″E
- Country: Iran
- Province: Razavi Khorasan
- County: Chenaran
- District: Seyyedabad
- Rural District: Hakimabad

Population (2016)
  - Total: 79
- Time zone: UTC+3:30 (IRST)

Bahman Jan-e Sofla (Persian: بهمن جان سفلي) (Note: Also romanized as Bahman Jān-e Soflá; also known as Bahmanjān-e Pā’īn) is a village in Hakimabad Rural District of Seyyedabad District in Chenaran County, Razavi Khorasan province, Iran.

== Demographics ==
=== Population ===
At the time of the 2006 National Census, the village's population was 93 in 22 households, when it was in Radkan Rural District of the Central District. The following census in 2011 counted 79 people in 25 households. The 2016 census measured the population of the village as 79 people in 22 households.

In 2020, the rural district was separated from the district in the formation of Radkan District, and Bahman Jan-e Sofla was transferred to Hakimabad Rural District created in the new Seyyedabad District.
