= Baru, Iran =

Village in Razavi Khorasan province, Iran

Baru Persian: بارو
- Village
- Location within Iran
- Coordinates: 36°53′22″N 59°01′40″E
- Country: Iran
- Province: Razavi Khorasan
- County: Chenaran
- District: Radkan
- Rural District: Radkan

Population (2016)
  - Total: 24
- Time zone: UTC+3:30 (IRST)

Baru (Persian: بارو) (Note: Also romanized as Bārū; also known as Bārū'ī (باروئي)) is a village in Radkan Rural District of Radkan District in Chenaran County, Razavi Khorasan province, Iran.

== Demographics ==
=== Population ===
At the time of the 2006 National Census, the village's population was 50 in 13 households, when it was in the Central District. The following census in 2011 counted 31 people in 11 households. The 2016 census measured the population of the village as 24 people in 11 households.

In 2020, the rural district was separated from the district in the formation of Radkan District.
