= Kalateh-ye Sadu =

Village in Razavi Khorasan province, Iran

Kalateh-ye Sadu Persian: كلاته سادو
- Village
- Location within Iran
- Coordinates: 36°45′43″N 59°00′29″E
- Country: Iran
- Province: Razavi Khorasan
- County: Chenaran
- District: Radkan
- Rural District: Radkan

Population (2016)
  - Total: 189
- Time zone: UTC+3:30 (IRST)

Kalateh-ye Sadu (Persian: كلاته سادو) (Note: Also romanized as Kalāteh-ye Sādow, Kalāteh-ye Şādū, and Kalāteh-ye Sādū) is a village in Radkan Rural District of Radkan District in Chenaran County, Razavi Khorasan province, Iran.

== Demographics ==
=== Population ===
At the time of the 2006 National Census, the village's population was 98 in 26 households, when it was in the Central District. The following census in 2011 counted 105 people in 31 households. The 2016 census measured the population of the village as 189 people in 62 households.

In 2020, the rural district was separated from the district in the formation of Radkan District.
