= Gol Khatun =

Gol Khatun گل خاتون
- Village
- Location within Iran
- Coordinates: 36°43′38″N 59°03′36″E
- Country: Iran
- Province: Razavi Khorasan
- County: Chenaran
- Bakhsh: Central
- Rural District: Chenaran

Population (2006)
  - Total: 132
- Time zone: UTC+3:30 (IRST)
  - Summer (DST): UTC+4:30 (IRDT)

Gol Khatun (Persian: گل خاتون, also Romanized as Gol Khātūn) is a village in Chenaran Rural District, in the Central District of Chenaran County, Razavi Khorasan Province, Iran. At the 2006 census, its population was 132, in 29 families.
