= Dalameh-ye Olya =

Village in Razavi Khorasan province, Iran

Dalameh-ye Olya Persian: دلمه عليا
- Village
- Location within Iran
- Coordinates: 37°00′14″N 59°03′37″E
- Country: Iran
- Province: Razavi Khorasan
- County: Chenaran
- District: Radkan
- Rural District: Radkan

Population (2016)
  - Total: 327
- Time zone: UTC+3:30 (IRST)

Dalameh-ye Olya (Persian: دلمه عليا) (Note: Also romanized as Dalameh-ye 'Olyā) is a village in Radkan Rural District of Radkan District in Chenaran County, Razavi Khorasan province, Iran.

== Demographics ==
=== Population ===
At the time of the 2006 National Census, the village's population was 220 in 43 households, when it was in the Central District. The following census in 2011 counted 270 people in 61 households. The 2016 census measured the population of the village as 327 people in 82 households.

In 2020, the rural district was separated from the district in the formation of Radkan District.
