= Nur ol Din =

Nur ol Din نورالدين
- Village
- Location within Iran
- Coordinates: 36°40′23″N 59°02′49″E
- Country: Iran
- Province: Razavi Khorasan
- County: Chenaran
- Bakhsh: Central
- Rural District: Chenaran

Population (2006)
  - Total: 265
- Time zone: UTC+3:30 (IRST)
  - Summer (DST): UTC+4:30 (IRDT)

Nur ol Din (Persian: نورالدين, also Romanized as Nūr ol Dīn and Nūr od Dīn; also known as Nūreddīn) is a village in Chenaran Rural District, in the Central District of Chenaran County, Razavi Khorasan Province, Iran. At the 2006 census, its population was 265, in 82 families.
