= Bagijan =

Bagijan بگيجان
- Village
- Location within Iran
- Coordinates: 36°45′02″N 59°08′01″E
- Country: Iran
- Province: Razavi Khorasan
- County: Chenaran
- Bakhsh: Central
- Rural District: Chenaran

Population (2006)
  - Total: 19
- Time zone: UTC+3:30 (IRST)
  - Summer (DST): UTC+4:30 (IRDT)

Bagijan (Persian: بگيجان, also Romanized as Bagījān; also known as Gījān, Ganjān, Giniān, and Ginjān) is a village in Chenaran Rural District, in the Central District of Chenaran County, Razavi Khorasan Province, Iran. At the 2006 census, its population was 19, in 5 families.

== See also ==
- List of cities, towns and villages in Razavi Khorasan Province
