= Zingar =

Village in Razavi Khorasan province, Iran

Zingar Persian: زينگر
- Village
- Location within Iran
- Coordinates: 36°45′44″N 59°01′12″E
- Country: Iran
- Province: Razavi Khorasan
- County: Chenaran
- District: Radkan
- Rural District: Ghiasabad

Population (2016)
  - Total: 175
- Time zone: UTC+3:30 (IRST)

Zingar (Persian: زينگر) (Note: Also romanized as Zīngar and Zīnger; also known as Zangār and Zanīgar) is a village in Ghiasabad Rural District of Radkan District in Chenaran County, Razavi Khorasan province, Iran.

== Demographics ==
=== Population ===
At the time of the 2006 National Census, the village's population was 129 in 36 households, when it was in Radkan Rural District of the Central District. The following census in 2011 counted 124 people in 38 households. The 2016 census measured the population of the village as 175 people in 53 households.

In 2020, the rural district was separated from the district in the formation of Radkan District, and Zingar was transferred to Ghiasabad Rural District created in the new district.
