= Goruh =

Goruh or Gorooh or Gorveh (Persian: گروه) may refer to:

- Goruh-e Sarhangcheh, Isfahan Province
- Goruh, Kerman
- Goruh, Razavi Khorasan
