= Akhlamad-e Olya =

Akhlamad-e Olya اخلمدعليا
- Village
- Location within Iran
- Coordinates: 36°35′39″N 58°56′44″E
- Country: Iran
- Province: Razavi Khorasan
- County: Chenaran
- Bakhsh: Central
- Rural District: Chenaran

Population (2006)
  - Total: 544
- Time zone: UTC+3:30 (IRST)
  - Summer (DST): UTC+4:30 (IRDT)

Akhlamad-e Olya (Persian: اخلمدعليا, also Romanized as Akhlamad-e-’Olyā; also known as Akhlamad, Akhlamad-e Bāla, and Akhlūmad) is a village in Chenaran Rural District, in the Central District of Chenaran County, Razavi Khorasan Province, Iran. At the 2006 census, its population was 544, in 173 families.

== See also ==
- List of cities, towns and villages in Razavi Khorasan Province
