= Gahs =

Gahs or GAHS may refer to:

- Mohamed Gahs (born 1963), Moroccan journalist and politician
- Gallia Academy High School (Gallipolis, Ohio), United States
- Galway Archaeological and Historical Society, Ireland
- Gardiner High School (Maine), Gardiner, Maine, United States
- Gary Allan High School, Halton, Ontario, Canada
- General Amherst High School, Amherstburg, Ontario, Canada
- Greater Astoria Historical Society, New York City, United States
- Glen Allen High School, Glen Allen, Virginia, United States

== See also ==
- Gah (disambiguation)
