= Kalateh-ye Gah =

Village in Razavi Khorasan province, Iran

Kalateh-ye Gah Persian: كلاته گاه
- Village
- Location within Iran
- Coordinates: 36°50′05″N 59°19′04″E
- Country: Iran
- Province: Razavi Khorasan
- County: Chenaran
- District: Central
- Rural District: Boq Mej

Population (2016)
  - Total: 56
- Time zone: UTC+3:30 (IRST)

Kalateh-ye Gah (Persian: كلاته گاه) (Note: Also romanized as Kalāteh-ye Gāh) is a village in Boq Mej Rural District of the Central District in Chenaran County, Razavi Khorasan province, Iran.

== Demographics ==
=== Population ===
At the time of the 2006 National Census, the village's population was 89 in 17 households. The following census in 2011 counted 48 people in 13 households. The 2016 census measured the population of the village as 56 people in 19 households.
