= Akhlamad-e Sofla =

Akhlamad-e Sofla اخلمدسفلي
- Village
- Country: Iran
- Province: Razavi Khorasan
- County: Chenaran
- Bakhsh: Central
- Rural District: Chenaran

Population (2006)
  - Total: 148
- Time zone: UTC+3:30 (IRST)
  - Summer (DST): UTC+4:30 (IRDT)

Akhlamad-e Sofla (Persian: اخلمدسفلي, also Romanized as Akhlamad-e Soflá) is a village in Chenaran Rural District, in the Central District of Chenaran County, Razavi Khorasan Province, Iran. At the 2006 census, its population was 148, in 52 families.

== See also ==
- List of cities, towns and villages in Razavi Khorasan Province
