= Melli, Iran =

Village in Razavi Khorasan province, Iran

Melli Persian: ملي
- Village
- Location within Iran
- Coordinates: 36°43′58″N 59°02′42″E
- Country: Iran
- Province: Razavi Khorasan
- County: Chenaran
- District: Central
- Rural District: Chenaran

Population (2016)
  - Total: 525
- Time zone: UTC+3:30 (IRST)

Melli (Persian: ملي) (Note: Also romanized as Mellī) is a village in Chenaran Rural District of the Central District in Chenaran County, Razavi Khorasan province, Iran.

== Demographics ==
=== Population ===
At the time of the 2006 National Census, the village's population was 481 in 109 households. The following census in 2011 counted 454 people in 125 households. The 2016 census measured the population of the village as 525 people in 159 households.
