= Sark, Razavi Khorasan =

Village in Razavi Khorasan province, Iran

Sark Persian: سرک
- Village
- Location within Iran
- Coordinates: 36°41′26″N 59°02′33″E
- Country: Iran
- Province: Razavi Khorasan
- County: Chenaran
- District: Central
- Rural District: Chenaran

Population (2016)
  - Total: 988
- Time zone: UTC+3:30 (IRST)

Sark (Persian: سرک) is a village in Chenaran Rural District of the Central District in Chenaran County, Razavi Khorasan province, Iran.

== Demographics ==
=== Population ===
At the time of the 2006 National Census, the village's population was 965 in 219 households. The following census in 2011 counted 931 people in 247 households. The 2016 census measured the population of the village as 988 people in 277 households.
