= Ghiasabad Rural District =

Rural district in Razavi Khorasan province, Iran

Ghiasabad Rural District Persian: دهستان غیاث‌آباد
- Rural District
- Location within Iran
- Coordinates: 36°45′44″N 59°01′12″E
- Country: Iran
- Province: Razavi Khorasan
- County: Chenaran
- District: Radkan
- Established: 2020
- Capital: Qiasabad
- Time zone: UTC+3:30 (IRST)

Ghiasabad Rural District (Persian: دهستان غیاث‌آباد) is in Radkan District of Chenaran County, Razavi Khorasan province, Iran. Its capital is the village of Qiasabad, whose population at the time of the 2016 National Census was 1,302 in 395 households.

== History ==
In 2020, Radkan Rural District was separated from the Central District in the formation of Radkan District, and Ghiasabad Rural District was created in the new district.

== Other villages in the rural district ==
- Aliabad
- Qezel Hesar
- Rezaabad-e Gijan Samedi
- Zingar
