= Radkan, Razavi Khorasan =

Village in Razavi Khorasan province, Iran

Radkan Persian: رادكان
- Village
- Location within Iran
- Coordinates: 36°47′58″N 59°00′44″E
- Country: Iran
- Province: Razavi Khorasan
- County: Chenaran
- District: Radkan
- Rural District: Radkan

Population (2016)
  - Total: 2,609
- Time zone: UTC+3:30 (IRST)

Radkan (Persian: رادكان) (Note: Also romanized as Rādekān and Rādkān; also known as Rādkāh) is a village in, and the former capital of, Radkan Rural District in Radkan District of Chenaran County, Razavi Khorasan province, Iran, serving as capital of the district. It was the capital of the rural district until its capital was transferred to the village of Marichgan.

Radkan is known for its well-preserved traditional mud-brick houses and historical monuments, including a castle and caravanserai. The village is surrounded by mountains and is a destination for nature-lovers, hikers and photographers. Additionally, the village is known for its natural hot springs and mineral water.

== History ==
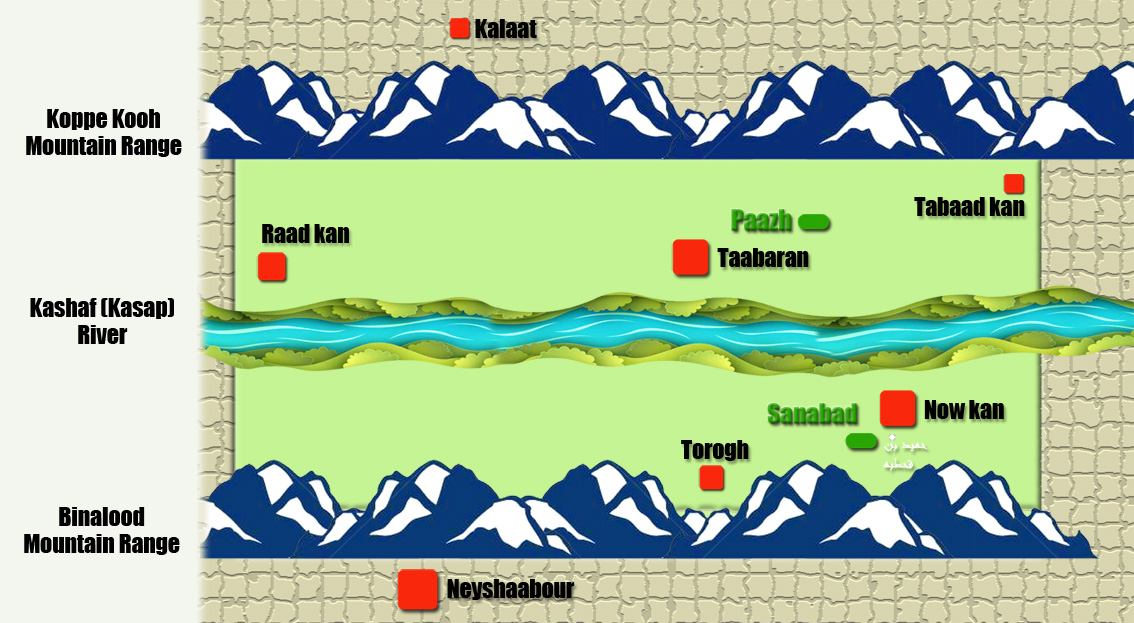
Toos (ancient Susia) region and the position of Radkan on it

=== Early history ===
The village was once an important center of trade and commerce along the ancient Silk Road. It was a key stopover point for merchants and travelers making their way across the region and was known for its thriving marketplaces and caravanserais. During the Sassanian era, the village was the site of several battles between the local population and invading forces. In more recent times, Radkan has been a center of resistance against colonial powers and has been the site of several important uprisings and revolts.

== Demographics ==
=== Ethnicity ===
The local population is primarily made up of ethnic Persians, and the majority of the population is Muslim.

=== Population ===
Radkan has a relatively low population density and is not as urbanized as some of the larger cities in the region.

At the time of the 2006 National Census, the village's population was 2,268 in 624 households, when it was in the Central District. The following census in 2011 counted 3,734 people in 1,004 households. The 2016 census measured the population of the village as 2,609 people in 784 households.

In 2020, the rural district was separated from the district in the formation of Radkan District.

== Geography ==
Radkan is surrounded by several mountain ranges. The mountains are home to a diverse range of flora and fauna, including rare and endangered species of plants and animals.
