= Kheyrabad, Chenaran =

Village in Razavi Khorasan province, Iran

Kheyrabad Persian: خيراباد
- Village
- Location within Iran
- Coordinates: 36°40′48″N 59°03′17″E
- Country: Iran
- Province: Razavi Khorasan
- County: Chenaran
- District: Central
- Rural District: Chenaran

Population (2016)
  - Total: 509
- Time zone: UTC+3:30 (IRST)

Kheyrabad (Persian: خيراباد) (Note: Also romanized as Kheyrābād; also known as Okheyrābād) is a village in, and the capital of, Chenaran Rural District in the Central District of Chenaran County, Razavi Khorasan province, Iran.

== Demographics ==
=== Population ===
At the time of the 2006 National Census, the village's population was 627 in 159 households. The following census in 2011 counted 574 people in 154 households. The 2016 census measured the population of the village as 509 people in 137 households.
