= Goruh, Razavi Khorasan =

Village in Razavi Khorasan province, Iran

Goruh Persian: گروه
- Village
- Location within Iran
- Coordinates: 36°57′27″N 59°06′08″E
- Country: Iran
- Province: Razavi Khorasan
- County: Chenaran
- District: Radkan
- Rural District: Radkan

Population (2016)
  - Total: 432
- Time zone: UTC+3:30 (IRST)

Goruh (Persian: گروه) (Note: Also romanized as Gorūh; also known as Gorū (گرو) and Gordeh) is a village in Radkan Rural District of Radkan District in Chenaran County, Razavi Khorasan province, Iran.

== Demographics ==
=== Population ===
At the time of the 2006 National Census, the village's population was 836 in 179 households, when it was in the Central District. The following census in 2011 counted 608 people in 154 households. The 2016 census measured the population of the village as 432 people in 121 households.

In 2020, the rural district was separated from the district in the formation of Radkan District.
