= Bahman Jan =

Bahman Jan or Bahmanjan (Persian: بهمن جان) may refer to:

- Bahman Jan-e Olya
- Bahman Jan-e Sofla
