= Khorramabad, Chenaran =

Village in Razavi Khorasan province, Iran

Khorramabad Persian: خرماباد
- Village
- Location within Iran
- Coordinates: 36°36′31″N 59°04′04″E
- Country: Iran
- Province: Razavi Khorasan
- County: Chenaran
- District: Central
- Rural District: Chenaran

Population (2016)
  - Total: 570
- Time zone: UTC+3:30 (IRST)

Khorramabad (Persian: خرماباد) (Note: Also romanized as Khorramābād; also known as Khurramābād) is a village in Chenaran Rural District of the Central District in Chenaran County, Razavi Khorasan province, Iran.

== Demographics ==
=== Population ===
At the time of the 2006 National Census, the village's population was 761 in 188 households. The following census in 2011 counted 758 people in 211 households. The 2016 census measured the population of the village as 570 people in 177 households.
