= Gash, Razavi Khorasan =

Village in Razavi Khorasan province, Iran

Gash Persian: گاش
- Village
- Location within Iran
- Coordinates: 36°53′35″N 59°14′59″E
- Country: Iran
- Province: Razavi Khorasan
- County: Chenaran
- District: Central
- Rural District: Boq Mej

Population (2016)
  - Total: 206
- Time zone: UTC+3:30 (IRST)

Gash (Persian: گاش) (Note: Also romanized as Gāsh; also known as Gās, Gush, and Qāsh) is a village in Boq Mej Rural District of the Central District in Chenaran County, Razavi Khorasan province, Iran.

== Demographics ==
=== Population ===
At the time of the 2006 National Census, the village's population was 418 in 99 households. The following census in 2011 counted 339 people in 92 households. The 2016 census measured the population of the village as 206 people in 64 households.
