= Baqmach =

Village in Razavi Khorasan province, Iran

Baqmach Persian: بقمچ
- Village
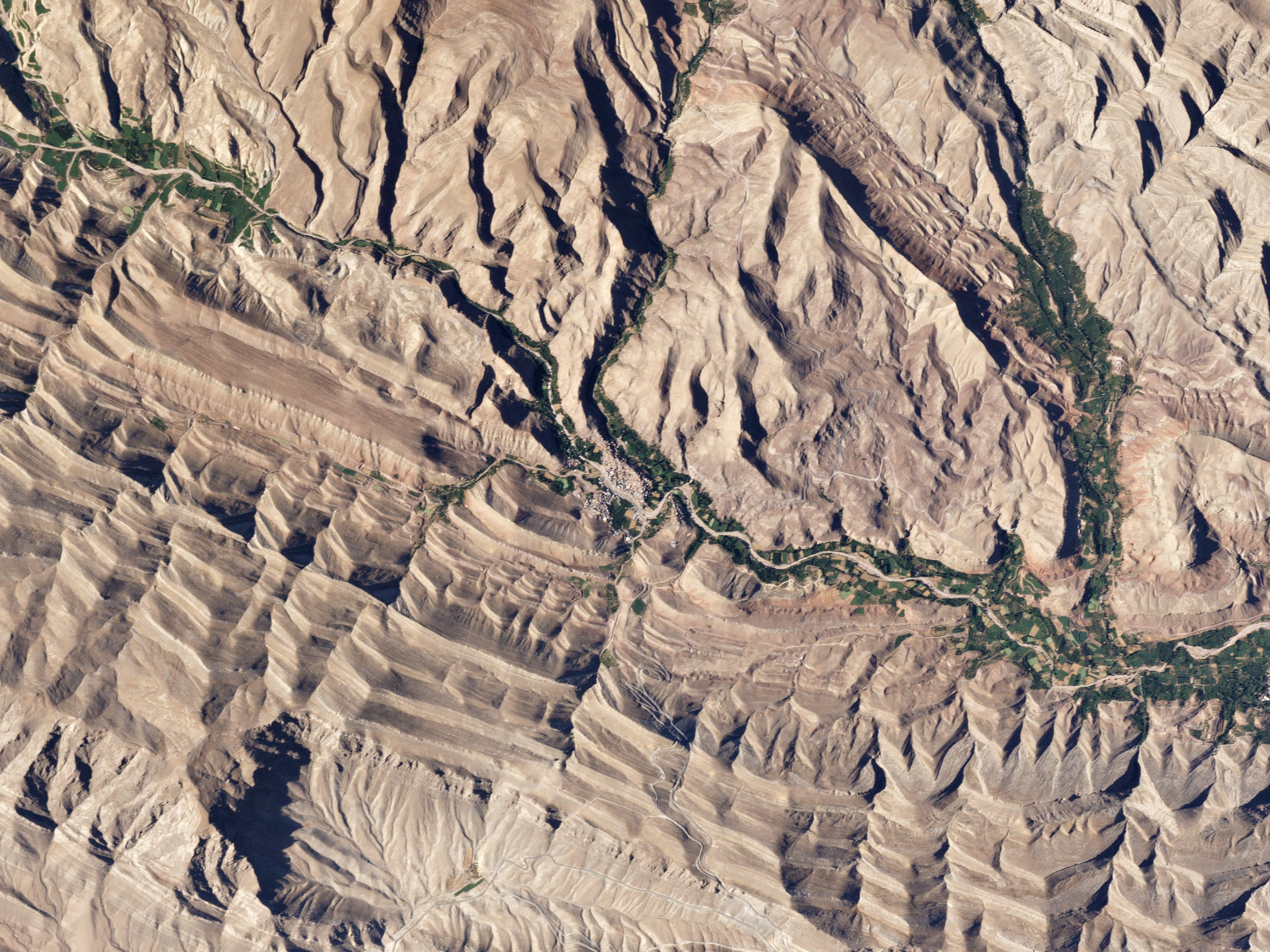
- Satellite image of Baqmach

- Location within Iran
- Coordinates: 36°50′55″N 59°14′45″E
- Country: Iran
- Province: Razavi Khorasan
- County: Chenaran
- District: Central
- Rural District: Boq Mej

Population (2016)
  - Total: 1,777
- Time zone: UTC+3:30 (IRST)

Baqmach (Persian: بقمچ) (Note: Also romanized as Boqmech; also known as Boghmech, Boqmej, Bughmish, Būqmaj, Būqmech, Būqmīch, and Būqmīsh) is a village in, and the capital of, Boq Mej Rural District in the Central District of Chenaran County, Razavi Khorasan province, Iran.

One of the attractions of the village is the alleys in the form of stone corridors that connect different areas of the village.

== Demographics ==
=== Population ===
At the time of the 2006 National Census, the village's population was 1,902 in 478 households. The following census in 2011 counted 1,544 people in 431 households. The 2016 census measured the population of the village as 1,777 people in 529 households, the most populous in its rural district.
