= Anjeshesh =

Village in Razavi Khorasan province, Iran

Anjeshesh Persian: انجشش
- Village
- Location within Iran
- Coordinates: 36°53′02″N 59°16′04″E
- Country: Iran
- Province: Razavi Khorasan
- County: Chenaran
- District: Central
- Rural District: Boq Mej

Population (2016)
  - Total: 902
- Time zone: UTC+3:30 (IRST)

Anjeshesh (Persian: انجشش) (Note: Also romanized as Anjesash, Anjesesh, and Anjshesh; also known as Anjīshesh) is a village in Boq Mej Rural District of the Central District in Chenaran County, Razavi Khorasan province, Iran.

== Demographics ==
=== Population ===
At the time of the 2006 National Census, the village's population was 1,089 in 223 households. The following census in 2011 counted 923 people in 223 households. The 2016 census measured the population of the village as 902 people in 267 households.
