= Sol Music Center =

Performing arts center dedicated to classical music

SOL Music Center
- Founder: Bahman Mehabadi
- Established: 1983
- President: Bahman Mehabadi
- Website: sol-philharmonic.com

SOL Music Center is a performing arts center dedicated to Classical Music. First founded in 1983 by Bahman Mehabadi in Tabriz, Iran, it was moved to Tehran, Iran, after several years of activity. Today it is home to SOL Philharmonic and SOL Music Educational Institute. SOL Philharmonic itself is organized into SOL Music Research and SOL Music Ensemble. SOL Music has performed in many concerts, published 19 Classical Music Albums, and presented over 100 issued articles about art and music.

== SOL Philharmonic ==
=== SOL Music Ensemble ===
==== 1996 - 1999 ====
SOL Music Ensemble, founded in 1996 by Bahman Mehabadi, dedicated its continuous activity to performing Classical Music. Bahman Mehabadi, who was a full-time violinist of the Tehran Symphonic Orchestra at the time, invited Mohammad Reza Sharifi, another violinist of the Tehran Symphonic Orchestra, and Susan Zandi, cellist and a graduate of the Tehran Conservatory of Music. So, Sol Music Ensemble was formed as a trio. They published their first album in 1997 (“Summer”) by Iran Seda publishing company and had their first performance in Niavaran Cultural Center. The trio continued its work and published two more albums in the next two years; “Fall” (1998, by Iran Seda publishing company) and “Winter” (1999, by Hamavaz Ahang publishing company). The trio performed mostly Baroque music and a few Modern pieces, all recorded live in their three albums.

==== 2000 - 2004 ====
Two members left Sol Music Ensemble and Mehabadi invited two students of SOL Music Educational Institute (Houman Behzadi & Pouria Keshavarz) to join the Ensemble and to form a violin trio. They performed and recorded SOL’s 4th album (“Gaiety”) in 2000 (by Hamavaz Ahang publishing company). Gaiety's cover was designed by Hida Behzadi using the picture of a painting by Bahman Mehabadi. In these years, the Ensemble's public relations was voluntarily and actively done by Homa Sadr Arhami, a music lover who always devotedly supported SOL Music Ensemble with her activities. Soon Houman Behzadi left the Ensemble to continue his music studies in the University of Western Ontario. So two other students of SOL Music Educational Institute (Nahid Abtahi (guitar) and Hooman Akhtari (violin)) were invited and the Ensemble’s form was changed to three violins and a guitar.

Nahid Abtahi, during the years of her presence in SOL Music, also took the role of designing covers for all the albums in which she played, often using the paintings of Bahman Mehabadi. Meanwhile, Mehabadi decided to establish SOL publishing company in order to publish its own albums. Ensemble, with its new members, performed in many occasions. Such as programs for Universities Music Festival, for Mahak Charity's benefit, and for Pajoohesh Week in Tehran University and published two other albums in 2003. “Benedictus” and “Creation” were the first albums published by SOL publishing company. SOL Music Ensemble donated part of the Benedictus sales to the earthquake victims of Bam in December 2003. The 7th album (“Miniature”) consisted of several pieces of Azerbaijan music. In December 2004, SOL Music Ensemble performed impressively in Craiova Centenar Music Festival (Romania), which made them more popular and more respected. They performed the program in Tehran’s Farhang Hall (Fajr Festival) too and recorded it as their next album (“Laudation”).

==== 2005 - 2008 ====
In order to extend the Ensemble, two new members were invited to join the group: Amar Dadizadeh (violin) and Zohreh HassanNia (piano). SOL Music owes its extension as an independent center to the professional insights of Helen Marx to this date. To celebrate “Mozart 250th Anniversary”, SOL Music Ensemble fully dedicated its 9th album to Wolfgang Amadeus Mozart and Henry Purcell works. In 2007 it was published as “Empyrean”. After recording the 10th album (“Song of Peace”), Amar Dadizadeh, Zohreh HassanNia, and Hooman Akhtari left the Ensemble to continue their studies. "Song of Peace" was published in 2009 and was dedicated to Professor Zaven Yedigharians (Father to SOL Music Ensemble, the first teacher of Bahman Mehabadi, and the teacher of many other great Iranian Violinists). Meanwhile, many concerts were performed by SOL Music Ensemble in different places in Tehran, such as in Germany Cultural Center, in Niavaran Cultural Center for the first Festival of Artistic Production, and in Vahdat Hall, and in a few Europe tours.

In January 2006, SOL publishing company participated in 40th Midem Music Exhibition, Cannes, France. Later, Nahal Mohebbi (violin) replaced Nahid Abtahi (guitar) to change the form of the Ensemble to violin trio one more time. The trio held a performance in Tabriz Cultural Center, being honored to have Professor Zaven Yedigharians in the audience.

==== 2009 - 2021 ====
Still wishing to extend the Ensemble, Mehabadi invited new members: Arghavan Sabahi (viola), Sara Abdollahzadeh (piano), Paranshid Shokoohi (piano), and Siamak Soltanalizadeh (viola). Maryam Tajik, Babak Nazari and Shahab Abtahi were also supportively present alongside other members. At this time, SOL Music Ensemble held seasonal concerts in its own place. They published new albums such as: “The Beyond” (Bahman Mehabadi, Pouria Keshavarz, Arghavan Sabahi and Sara Abdollahzadeh) in 2010, “The Apple” (Bahman Mehabadi, Nahal Mohebbi and Sara Abdollahzadeh) in 2011, “The Strawberry” (Bahman Mehabadi, Pouria Keshavarz, Arghavan Sabahi and Paranshid Shokoohi) in 2012, “Bloom of Colors” (Bahman Mehabadi, Nahal Mohebbi and Sara Abdollahzadeh) in 2013, “Aura” (Bahman Mehabadi, Nahal Mohebbi, Arghavan Sabahi, Siamak Soltanalizadeh, Sara Abdollahzadeh and Paranshid Shokoohi, by SOL Music in Germany) in 2015, and “Liebesleid” (Bahman Mehabadi and Paranshid Shokoohi, by SOL Music in Germany) in 2018. Except two albums (“The Beyond” and “The Apple") whose covers were designed by Maryam Abtahi, the design of all the next album covers was done by Bahman Mehabadi and performed by Shahab Abtahi and Siamak Soltanalizadeh. Since 2012, with growing popularity, they have performed regular concerts in Iran House of Music, the Institute of Art and Culture, and Iranian Artists Forum’s Shahnaz Hall.

Along the regular activities of the Ensemble, Bahman Mehabadi’s live performance of Bach Sonatas and Partitas was decided to be published by SOL Music in Germany. Shahab Abtahi and Siamak Soltanalizadeh were in charge of preparing the live records for publishing. The album was recognized as one of the best Bach performances in 2015. The latest albums released by SOL Music are “Recital” (2020, Germany), which is the live recording of violin and piano recital by Bahman Mehabadi and Wolf Iysenger, and "My Guitar Favourites" (guitar by Bahman Mehabadi, 2021, Germany).

== Discography ==
1. "Summer" (1997)
2. "Fall" (1998)
3. "Winter" (1999)
4. "Gaiety" (2000)
5. "Benedictus" (2003)
6. "Creation" (2003)
7. "Miniature" (2004)
8. "Laudation" (2005)
9. "Empyrean" (Sol Ensemble's manifesto in commemoration of Mozart 250th Anniversary, 2007)
10. "Song of Peace" (2009)
11. "The Beyond" (2010)
12. "The Apple" (2011)
13. "The Strawberry" (2012)
14. "Bloom of Colors" (2013)
15. "Mehabadi & Bach" (Sonatas and Partitas, 2014)
16. "Aura" (2015)
17. "Liebesleid" (2018)
18. "Recital" (2020)
19. "My Guitar Favourites" (2021)
