= Dahaneh-ye Akhlamad =

Village in Razavi Khorasan province, Iran

Dahaneh-ye Akhlamad Persian: دهنه اخلمد
- Village
- Location within Iran
- Coordinates: 36°39′51″N 58°58′15″E
- Country: Iran
- Province: Razavi Khorasan
- County: Chenaran
- District: Central
- Rural District: Chenaran

Population (2016)
  - Total: 722
- Time zone: UTC+3:30 (IRST)

Dahaneh-ye Akhlamad (Persian: دهنه اخلمد) (Note: Also known as Akhlamad, Akhtamand, Dahanehé Akhlemad, and Dahaneh-ye Akhlūmad) is a village in Chenaran Rural District of the Central District in Chenaran County, Razavi Khorasan province, Iran.

== Demographics ==
=== Population ===
At the time of the 2006 National Census, the village's population was 565 in 153 households. The following census in 2011 counted 514 people in 160 households. The 2016 census measured the population of the village as 722 people in 218 households.
