= Gaveh-ye Kalateh =

Village in Razavi Khorasan province, Iran

Gaveh-ye Kalateh Persian: گوه كلاته
- Village
- Country: Iran
- Province: Razavi Khorasan
- County: Chenaran
- District: Central
- Rural District: Chenaran

Population (2016)
  - Total: 27
- Time zone: UTC+3:30 (IRST)

Gaveh-ye Kalateh (Persian: گوه كلاته) (Note: Also romanized as Gaveh-ye Kalāteh) is a village in Chenaran Rural District of the Central District in Chenaran County, Razavi Khorasan province, Iran.

== Demographics ==
=== Population ===
At the time of the 2006 National Census, the village's population was 35 in eight households. The following census in 2011 counted 52 people in 11 households. The 2016 census measured the population of the village as 27 people in eight households.
