= Gah, Iran =

Village in Razavi Khorasan province, Iran

Gah Persian: گاه
- Village
- Location within Iran
- Coordinates: 36°50′03″N 59°17′59″E
- Country: Iran
- Province: Razavi Khorasan
- County: Chenaran
- District: Central
- Rural District: Boq Mej

Population (2016)
  - Total: 329
- Time zone: UTC+3:30 (IRST)

Gah (Persian: گاه) (Note: Also romanized as Gāh) is a village in Boq Mej Rural District of the Central District in Chenaran County, Razavi Khorasan province, Iran.

== Demographics ==
=== Population ===
At the time of the 2006 National Census, the village's population was 447 in 100 households. The following census in 2011 counted 288 people in 82 households. The 2016 census measured the population of the village as 329 people in 101 households.
