= Hakimabad Rural District (Chenaran County) =

Rural district in Razavi Khorasan province, Iran

Hakimabad Rural District Persian: دهستان حکیم‌آباد
- Rural District
- Location within Iran
- Coordinates: 36°52′N 58°53′E
- Country: Iran
- Province: Razavi Khorasan
- County: Chenaran
- District: Seyyedabad
- Established: 2020
- Capital: Hakimabad
- Time zone: UTC+3:30 (IRST)

Hakimabad Rural District (Persian: دهستان حکیم‌آباد) is in Seyyedabad District of Chenaran County, Razavi Khorasan province, Iran. Its capital is the village of Hakimabad, whose population at the time of the 2016 National Census was 771 people in 234 households.

== History ==
In 2020, Seyyedabad District was formed and Hakimabad Rural District was created in the new district.

== Other villages in the rural district ==
- Abgahi
- Aliabad-e Bahman Jan
- Bahman Jan-e Olya
- Bahman Jan-e Sofla
- Beyram Shah
- Cham Gard
- Govareshkan
- Hajjiabad
- Kalateh-ye Jafar
- Muchenan
- Qezel Kan
- Sowhan
