= Gaveh-ye Khaleseh =

Village in Razavi Khorasan province, Iran

Gaveh-ye Khaleseh Persian: گوه خالصه
- Village
- Location within Iran
- Coordinates: 36°39′01″N 59°05′30″E
- Country: Iran
- Province: Razavi Khorasan
- County: Chenaran
- District: Central
- Rural District: Chenaran

Population (2016)
  - Total: 505
- Time zone: UTC+3:30 (IRST)

Gaveh-ye Khaleseh (Persian: گوه خالصه) (Note: Also romanized as Gaveh-ye Khāleṣeh, Gaveh-ye Khalseh, and Gaveh-ye Khālṣeh; also known as Gaveh) is a village in Chenaran Rural District of the Central District in Chenaran County, Razavi Khorasan province, Iran.

== Demographics ==
=== Population ===
At the time of the 2006 National Census, the village's population was 441 in 104 households. The following census in 2011 counted 537 people in 147 households. The 2016 census measured the population of the village as 505 people in 152 households.
