= Boq Mej Rural District =

Rural district in Razavi Khorasan province, Iran

Boq Mej Rural District Persian: دهستان بق مج
- Rural District
- Location within Iran
- Coordinates: 36°52′N 59°15′E
- Country: Iran
- Province: Razavi Khorasan
- County: Chenaran
- District: Central
- Established: 1993
- Capital: Baqmach

Population (2016)
  - Total: 3,270
- Time zone: UTC+3:30 (IRST)

Boq Mej Rural District (Persian: دهستان بق مج) is in the Central District of Chenaran County, Razavi Khorasan province, Iran. Its capital is the village of Baqmach.

== Demographics ==
=== Population ===
At the time of the 2006 National Census, the rural district's population was 3,945 in 917 households. There were 3,142 inhabitants in 841 households at the following census of 2011. The 2016 census measured the population of the rural district as 3,270 in 980 households. The most populous of its five villages was Baqmach, with 1,777 people.

=== Other villages in the rural district ===
- Anjeshesh
- Gah
- Gash
- Kalateh-ye Gah
