= Gah =

Gah may refer to:

- Gah, Iran, a village in Razavi Khorasan Province
- Gah, Pakistan, a village in Chakwal District
- Gāh, a period of time in Zoroastrianism
- the ISO 639-3 code for the Alekano language, also known as Gahuku, spoken in the Eastern Highlands Province of Papua New Guinea
- Gayndah Airport, IATA code
- Guanine deaminase, an enzyme
