= Bahman Koohestani =

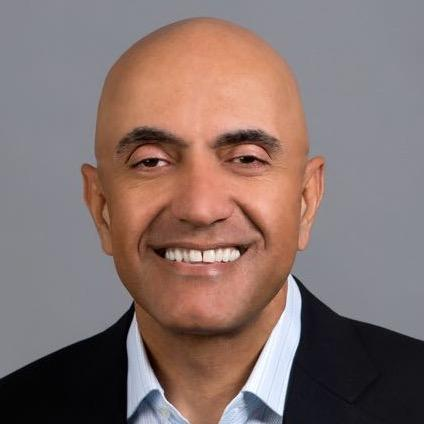
- Koohestani image in 2016
- Born: 1962 (age 63–64); Canada
- Education: York University (B.Sc. Computer Science)
- Occupation: Business executive
- Years active: 1990–present
- Known for: Netscape Communications, Delano Technology, LendingClub, ACV Auctions
- Title: Chief Technology Officer, ACV Auctions Inc.
- Children: 2

Bahman Koohestani is a Canadian business executive in the technology sector known for his roles at Netscape Communications Corporation, Delano Technology Corporation, LendingClub, and ACV Auctions. He was the founder of Delano and has experience in software engineering, fintech, and large-scale digital marketplaces.

== Early life and education ==
Koohestani was Born in Canada to parents of Iranian heritage. He earned a Bachelor of Science degree in Computer Science from York University in Toronto, Canada.

== Career ==
He began his career at Delrina Corporation in Toronto, serving as Director of Forms and Enterprise Software from around 1990 to 1993.

In 1995, Koohestani joined Netscape Communications Corporation, where he worked in the messaging and servers division during the commercial web browser’s early development.

In 1998, Koohestani co-founded Delano Technology Corporation, an enterprise software company providing e-business integration and automation tools. He served as Executive Vice President and Chief Technology Officer, expanding the firm from about 7 employees to over 600 before taking it public on NASDAQ. Delano Technology was later acquired by Divine, Inc. in 2002.

Koohestani became Chief Information Officer of Orbitz Worldwide Inc. in 2004, leading global technology delivery for its travel platforms. He subsequently held senior technology and product leadership positions at NexTag Inc., PayPal Inc., and Thomson Reuters Corporation.

In April 2018, Koohestani was appointed Chief Technology Officer of LendingClub Corporation, overseeing product engineering, design, and data science.

On 9 September 2021, he joined ACV Auctions Inc. as Chief Technology Officer, where he led technology, product, and data strategy for the automotive marketplace.

== Personal life ==
Koohestani is based in the San Francisco Bay Area and enjoys aviation, golf, and European history.
