= Deh Now-ye Bahman =

Deh Now-ye Bahman دهنوبهمن
- Village
- Location within Iran
- Coordinates: 30°08′03″N 51°41′50″E
- Country: Iran
- Province: Fars
- County: Mamasani
- Bakhsh: Central
- Rural District: Javid-e Mahuri

Population (2006)
  - Total: 93
- Time zone: UTC+3:30 (IRST)
  - Summer (DST): UTC+4:30 (IRDT)

Deh Now-ye Bahman (Persian: دهنوبهمن, also Romanized as Dehnow Bahman; also known as Dehnow) is a village in Javid-e Mahuri Rural District, in the Central District of Mamasani County, Fars province, Iran. At the 2006 census, its population was 93, in 21 families.
