= Bahman, Iran =

Bahman بهمن / بهمان
- Village
- Location within Iran
- Coordinates: 36°08′46″N 58°48′35″E
- Country: Iran
- Province: Razavi Khorasan
- County: Nishapur
- Bakhsh: Central
- Rural District: Darbqazi

Population (2006)
  - Total: 189
- Time zone: UTC+3:30 (IRST)
  - Summer (DST): UTC+4:30 (IRDT)

Bahman (Persian: بهمن or بهمان, also Romanized as Bahmān) is a village in Darbqazi Rural District, in the Central District of Nishapur County, Razavi Khorasan Province, Iran. At the 2006 census, its population was 189, in 48 families.

== etymology ==
In modern Persian "Bahman" literally means "Snow Avalanche". But Bahman is also thought to be a derivative modern form of Vohu Manah. Vôhü Manö consists of two parts: VÔHÜ coming from the root vah, from Proto-Indo-European *ves 'to revere, stand in awe of', and MAN meaning 'passion, determination, spirit, mind power'. Vohu Manah is also a concept in Zoroastrianism meaning "pure mind/spirit" or "absolute consciousness".

== See also ==
- List of cities, towns and villages in Razavi Khorasan Province
