= Bahmani, Fasa =

Bahmani بهمني
- Village
- Location within Iran
- Coordinates: 29°04′37″N 53°27′59″E
- Country: Iran
- Province: Fars
- County: Fasa
- Bakhsh: Central
- Rural District: Jangal

Population (2006)
  - Total: 39
- Time zone: UTC+3:30 (IRST)
  - Summer (DST): UTC+4:30 (IRDT)

Bahmani (Persian: بهمني, also Romanized as Bahmanī) is a village in Jangal Rural District, in the Central District of Fasa County, Fars province, Iran. At the 2006 census, its population was 39, in 9 families.
