= Qaleh-ye Bahman, Fars =

Qaleh-ye Bahman قلعه بهمن
- Village
- Location within Iran
- Coordinates: 29°18′32″N 54°10′29″E
- Country: Iran
- Province: Fars
- County: Neyriz
- Bakhsh: Central
- Rural District: Rostaq

Population (2006)
  - Total: 349
- Time zone: UTC+3:30 (IRST)
  - Summer (DST): UTC+4:30 (IRDT)

Qaleh-ye Bahman (Persian: قلعه بهمن, also Romanized as Qal‘eh-ye Bahman and Qal‘eh Bahman) is a village in Rostaq Rural District, in the Central District of Neyriz County, Fars province, Iran. At the 2006 census, its population was 349, in 89 families.
