= Bahman Cultural Center =

Coordinates: 35°38′43″N 51°23′50″E

The Bahman Cultural Center (Bahman Farhangsara) is municipally created public space for cultural advancement in Tehran. The largest and first of its kind in the city, it was followed by the creation of 8 similar large complexes and about 50 smaller neighborhood centers. Its campus-like premises include exhibition halls, theatres, concert halls, restaurants, cafes, classrooms, a library, a gymnasium, a swimming pool, and a skating rink.

Opened in 1991 through the efforts of Gholamhossein Karbaschi and other politicians, the Bahman Cultural Center used to be a slaughterhouse in the slums of southern Tehran. The presence of the slaughterhouse created problems of pollution which spread trash, animal remains, and bad smells into the surrounding areas. This in turn caused property values to decrease, which attracted a very low-income population. Plagued by such sanitation maladies, the areas surrounding the slaughterhouse become a cesspool of crime, violence, and prostitution.

The Bahman Cultural Center has had a significant impact on the process of social change in Iran. Cultural enrichment awakened women to their rights and gave them the confidence to stand up for those rights.

The Bahman Cultural Center also enriched the lives of youth in the area. It exposed youngsters to English, computers, music, and musical instruments. It provides the youth with invaluable tools they will need in a modern and dynamic world Iran is becoming. Furthermore, another important feature of the Bahman Cultural Center was that in diminished the cultural duality between northern and southern Tehran. Northern Tehran has always been the intellectual and cultural hub of Tehran. The creation of the Bahman Cultural Center somewhat shifts that balance.
