= Bahmani, Sepidan =

Bahmani بهمني
- Village
- Location within Iran
- Coordinates: 30°03′51″N 52°27′13″E
- Country: Iran
- Province: Fars
- County: Sepidan
- Bakhsh: Beyza
- Rural District: Banesh

Population (2006)
  - Total: 167
- Time zone: UTC+3:30 (IRST)
  - Summer (DST): UTC+4:30 (IRDT)

Bahmani (Persian: بهمني, also Romanized as Bahmanī; also known as Bahmé, Bahmeh’ī, and Bahme’ī) is a village in Banesh Rural District, Beyza District, Sepidan County, Fars province, Iran. At the 2006 census, its population was 167, in 35 families.
