= Benny Rebel =

Iranian-German photographer

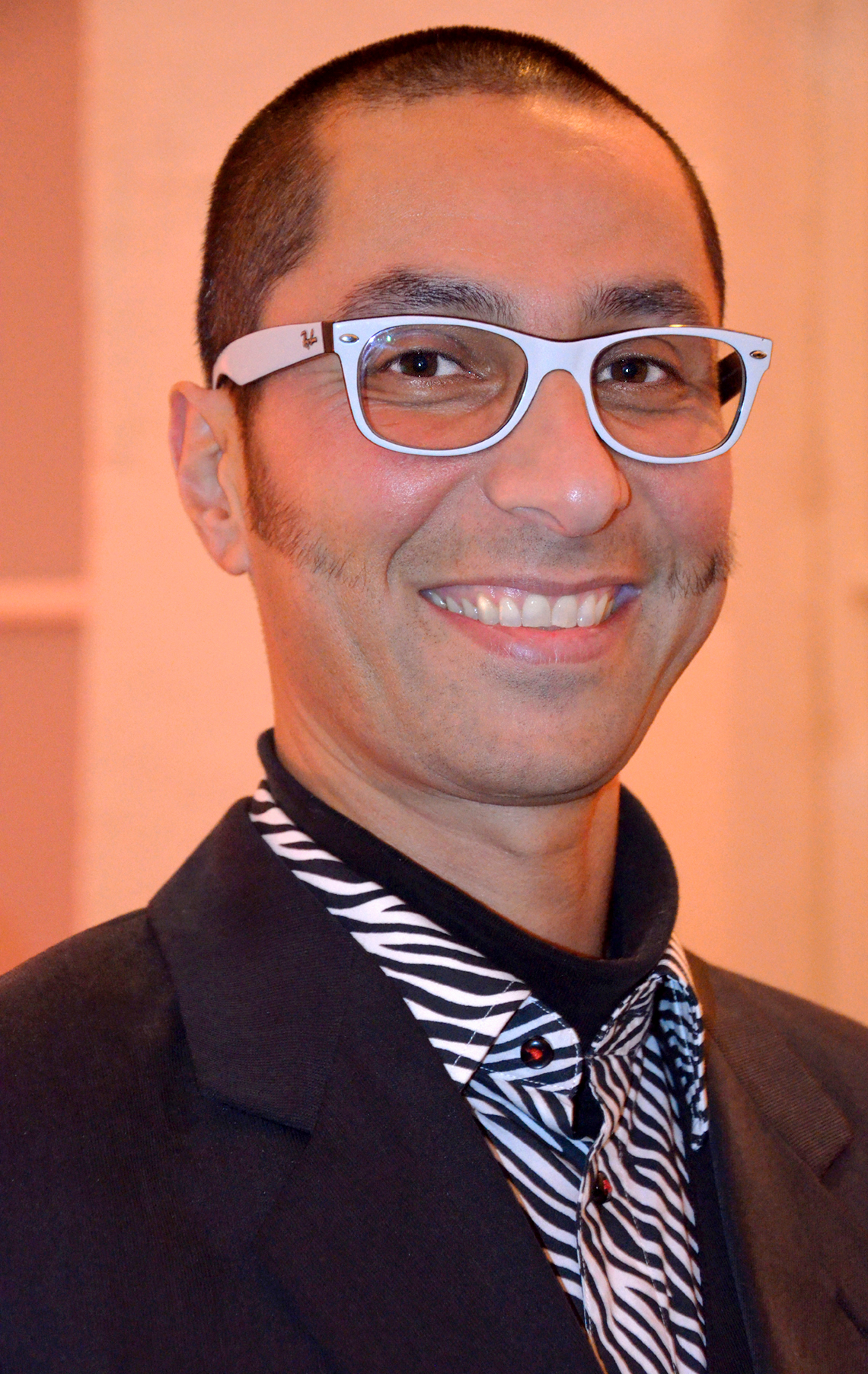
- Born: Bahman Vafaeinejad (بهمن وفائی‌نژاد); August 13, 1968 (age 57); Arak, Imperial State of Iran
- Citizenship: German
- Occupation: photographer
- Known for: extreme close-up photographing of wildlife
- Awards: Trierenberg Super Circuit, two gold medals
- Website: www.benny-rebel.de (German) www.benny-rebel.de/en/ (English)

Benny Rebel, born Bahman Vafaeinejad (Persian: بهمن وفائی‌نژاد; born August 13, 1968, in Arak, Iran), is an Iranian-German photographer known for his extreme close-up portraits of dangerous wildlife of Africa by approaching within feet of the animals.

In 1987, Rebel immigrated to Hannover, Germany. His interest in wildlife conservation led to his involvement with the environmental advocacy group Greenpeace.

He has taken adventures in many countries, including South Africa, Namibia, Zimbabwe, Zambia, Rwanda, Kenya and Uganda, as well as Iran, Turkey, India, Sri Lanka, Mexico, Costa Rica, the Galápagos Islands, Ecuador, the Dominican Republic, the United States and some European countries.

Benny Rebel was awarded two gold medals by Trierenberg Super Circuit of Austria in 2002 and 2003.

== Works ==
=== Exhibitions ===
- Zu schön um zu sterben [Too Beautiful to Die] (2000), in Hannover; comprising images of threatened wildlife he encountered mostly in South Africa.
- Bedrohte afrikanische Schönheiten [Endangered African Beauties] (2003), at Galerie im Keller in Hannover

=== TV shows ===
He has appeared in many TV shows of NDR, ARD, Arte, BR, MDR, RBB, RTL, Sat.1, SWR, WDR, ZDF, as well as Iranian channels IR 2 and IRIB Aftab.

=== Documentary films ===
- In Search of the King Cheetah (2006): a 60-minute documentation produced by NDR about Benny Rebel's work in South Africa.
- Wild Iran (2007): in 2006, Benny Rebel returned to Iran and produced this documentary about the wildlife of Iran.
- In 2007, Benny Rebel produced a documentary film about the extinction of the Bengal tiger in India
- In 2012, the German TV chains "ZDF / ARTE" produced two 45-minutes documentary films with Benny Rebel in Iran. This was a coproduction with following TV channels: WDR, BR, ORF and ARD.

=== Books ===
- Ungezähmt [Untamed] (2006), Munich: Herbig, ISBN 3776624841: a book of his images from Africa and the Galápagos Islands; preface of the book is written by Heinz Sielmann.
- Die Tiere Afrikas in 3-D [Wildlife of Africa in 3D] (2007), Terra Magica, ISBN 3724310013: featured images of African animals captured by using three-dimensional photographic technology.
- Mein Abenteuer Wildnis: Erlebnisse eines Tierfotografen [My Wilderness Adventure: Experiences of a Wildlife Photographer] (2010), Terra Magica, ISBN 3724310277, 240 pages
- Bild-Design [Image Design] (2010), ISBN 9783000330421: a book of photography tips in 80 pages with 145 photos.

== Awards ==
- 2002 Trierenberg Super Circuit, Austria, gold medal, Nature category
- 2003 Trierenberg Super Circuit, Austria, gold medal, Nature category
