= Bahman Amiri Moghaddam =

Iranian politician (born 1962)

Sardar معروف به بهمن قالپاق Bahman Amiri Moghaddam
- Born: 1962 (age 63–64); Kermanshah, Iran
- Allegiance: Iran
- Branch: Islamic Revolutionary Guard Corps Law Enforcement Command of the Islamic Republic of Iran
- Rank: Second brigadier general
- Conflicts: Iran–Iraq War

Governor-general of Kermanshah
- In office 5 January 2022 – 21 December 2022
- President: Ebrahim Raisi
- Preceded by: Hoshang Bazvand
- Succeeded by: Mohammad-Tayyeb Sahraee

Bahman Amiri Moghadam (born in 1962) is an Iranian soldier and former governor of Kermanshah province in the 13th government. He was appointed as the governor of Kermanshah province on 5 January 2022 after receiving the vote of confidence from the Board of Ministers. He was born in Kermanshah.
