= Abraham Zinger =

Russian-Jewish author, feuilletonist and translator

- אברהם זינגער
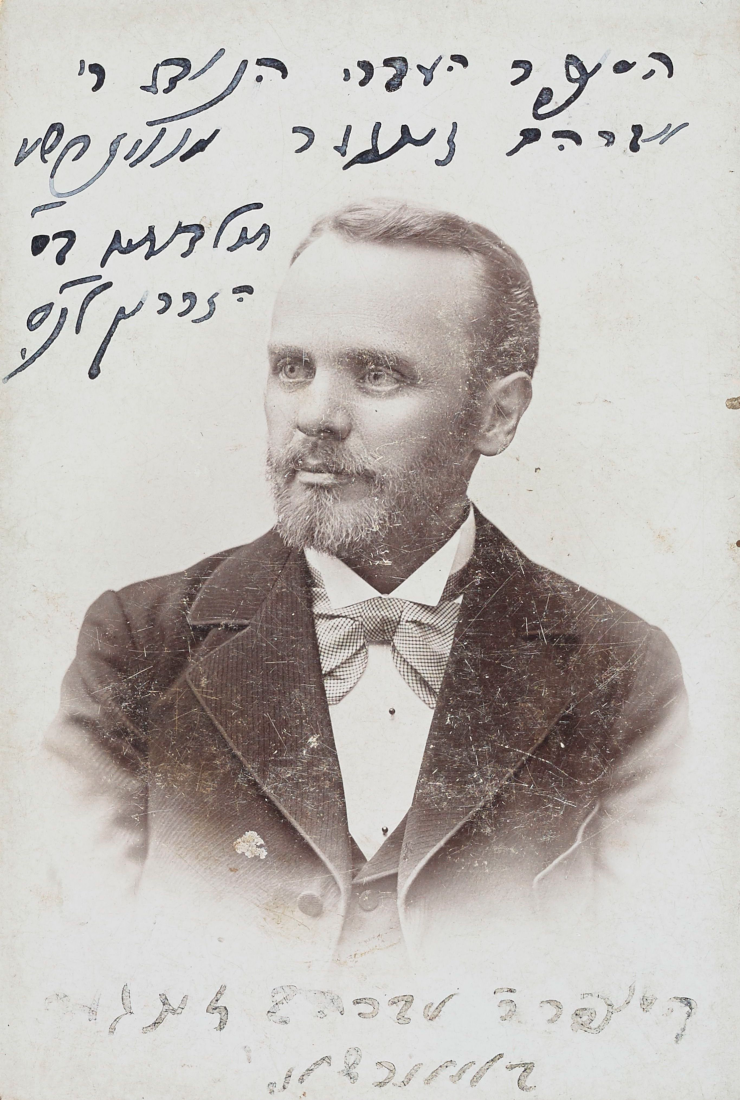
- Portrait of Zinger by W. Twardzicki
- Born: 1864; Kapulye, Minsk Governorate, Russian Empire
- Died: 1920 (aged 55–56); Babroysk, Minsk Governorate, Russian Empire
- Spouse: Penina (Paulina) Lowenthal (m. 1895)
- Writing career
- Language: Hebrew, Yiddish

Abraham Zinger (Hebrew: אברהם זינגער; 1864, Kapulye – 1920, Babroysk) was a Russian-Jewish author, feuilletonist, and translator.

== Biography ==
Zinger was born in Kapulye, Minsk Governorate. Orphaned at the age of 10, he studied at Minsk, Slutsk, Pinsk, Nesvizh, and Mir, meanwhile encountering Haskalah literature.

He worked as a Hebrew teacher in Warsaw from 1888, but fled to his hometown during the Russian withdrawal from Poland in 1915. Amid the pogroms following Operation Minsk, he attempted in 1920 to return to Warsaw, but contracted typhus on the way there. He succumbed to the disease in Bobruisk.

== Work ==
In about 1885, Zinger began writing stories and articles for Hebrew periodicals like Ha-Melitz, Ha-Asif, and Knesset Israel. As a literary critic, he reviewed the Hebrew poetry of I. L. Peretz, among other writers. He later also contributed to the Yiddish journals Der Yud, Der Tog, and Unzer Leben.

Under the title Ohel Tom, he published in 1896 a Hebrew translation of Harriet Beecher Stowe's Uncle Tom's Cabin; or, Life Among the Lowly. David Ben-Gurion would later cite Zinger's translation as influential on his ideological development.

=== Partial bibliography ===
- "Masekhat kala" [A Bride's Mask]. Ha-Melitz (in Hebrew). 20 (91). Saint Petersburg: 2–3. December 1884.
- "Gever lo yitzlaḥ" [A Man That Will Not Prosper]. Aḥiasaf (in Hebrew). 6. Warsaw: Defus Shuldberg ve-shutafo: 85–103. 1887.
- "Ye'ush she-lo mida'at" [Despair Without Awareness]. Aḥiasaf (in Hebrew). 6. Warsaw: Defus Shuldberg ve-shutafo: 20–45. 1888.
- "ʿAl em ha-derekh" [At the Crossroads]. Ha-Asif (in Hebrew). 5. Warsaw: Defus R. Me'ir Yeḥiel Halter: 65–102. 1889.
- "Tzarat ha-bat" [The Daughter's Woes]. Ha-Melitz (in Hebrew). 29 (41, 43–4, 46–7, 50–1, 55, 58, 60, 62, 65–6, 68–72, 74, 80, 86–7, 89). Saint Petersburg. March–May 1889.
- "Nefashot porḥot" [Blossoming Souls]. Ha-Melitz (in Hebrew). 29 (107, 109, 112, 116, 119–20). Saint Petersburg. May–June 1889.
- Mishut ba-aretz [Wandering Around the Earth] (in Hebrew). Warsaw: Defus Levinski. 1890.
- "Met mitzvah. Zikhron le-David holekh ve-lo yashuv od" [An Abandoned Corpse]. Keneset Ha-gedolah. 2 (3). Warsaw: Defus R. Me'ir Yeḥiel Halter: 36–50. 1890.
- "Ḥag ha-aviv" [The Festival of Spring]. Ha-Melitz (in Hebrew). 31 (84–5). April 1891.
- Korban ha-yom: tsiyur me-ḥaye bene ʻamenu ba-yamim ha-aḥaronim [Sacrifice of the Day: A Portrait of the Lives of Our People in the Days of Past] (in Hebrew). Warsaw: Defus ha-aḥim Shuldberg. 1893.
- Devar kol ḥazon [The Word of Every Prophecy] (in Hebrew). Saint Petersburg: Defus Berman ve-Rabinovitz. 1894.
- "Teshuva le-dorot" [Repentance for the Generations]. Talpiot (in Hebrew) (6). Berdichev: Defus shel Ḥayyim Ya'akov Sheptil: 50–57. 1895.
- "ʿAl lev Yerushalayim" [On the Heart of Jerusalem]. Talpiot (in Hebrew) (11). Berdichev: Defus shel Ḥayyim Ya'akov Sheptil: 1–5. 1895.
- Stowe, Harriet Beecher (1896). Ohel Tom, o, ha-ḥayim ben ʻavde ʻolam [Uncle Tom's Cabin; or, Life Among the Lowly] (in Hebrew). Translated by Zinger, Abraham. Warsaw: L. Zuckermann.
- "Yesurin shel ahava" [Sufferings of Love]. Ha-Zman (in Hebrew). Warsaw: Defus E. Boymritter: 91–100. 1896.
- "Tzitz novel" [A Withered Flower]. Ha-Shiloaḥ (in Hebrew). 3. Berlin: Defus Tzvi Hirsch ben R. Yitzḥak Itzkovski: 253–262. 1898.
- "Tsvey sdorim" [Two Siddurs]. Der Yud (in Yiddish). 3 (14–15). Krakaw: 23–26. 3 April 1901.
- Beli tekumah: sipur me-ḥaye bene Yisraʼel bi-shenot ha-shemonim [Without Resistance] (in Hebrew). Saint Petersburg: Defus Ha-Melitz. 1902.
