= Seyyedabad Rural District =

Rural district in Razavi Khorasan province, Iran

Seyyedabad Rural District Persian: دهستان سیدآباد
- Rural District
- Location within Iran
- Coordinates: 36°41′N 58°53′E
- Country: Iran
- Province: Razavi Khorasan
- County: Chenaran
- District: Seyyedabad
- Established: 2020
- Capital: Chahar Mahan
- Time zone: UTC+3:30 (IRST)

Seyyedabad Rural District (Persian: دهستان سیدآباد) is in Seyyedabad District of Chenaran County, Razavi Khorasan province, Iran. Its capital is the village of Chahar Mahan, whose population at the time of the 2016 National Census was 370 people in 111 households.

== History ==
In 2020, Seyyedabad District was formed and Seyyedabad Rural District was created in the new district.

== Other villages in the rural district ==
- Mohammadabad
- Sheykh Kanlu
