= Bahman Mehabadi =

Iranian violinist, music teacher, and composer

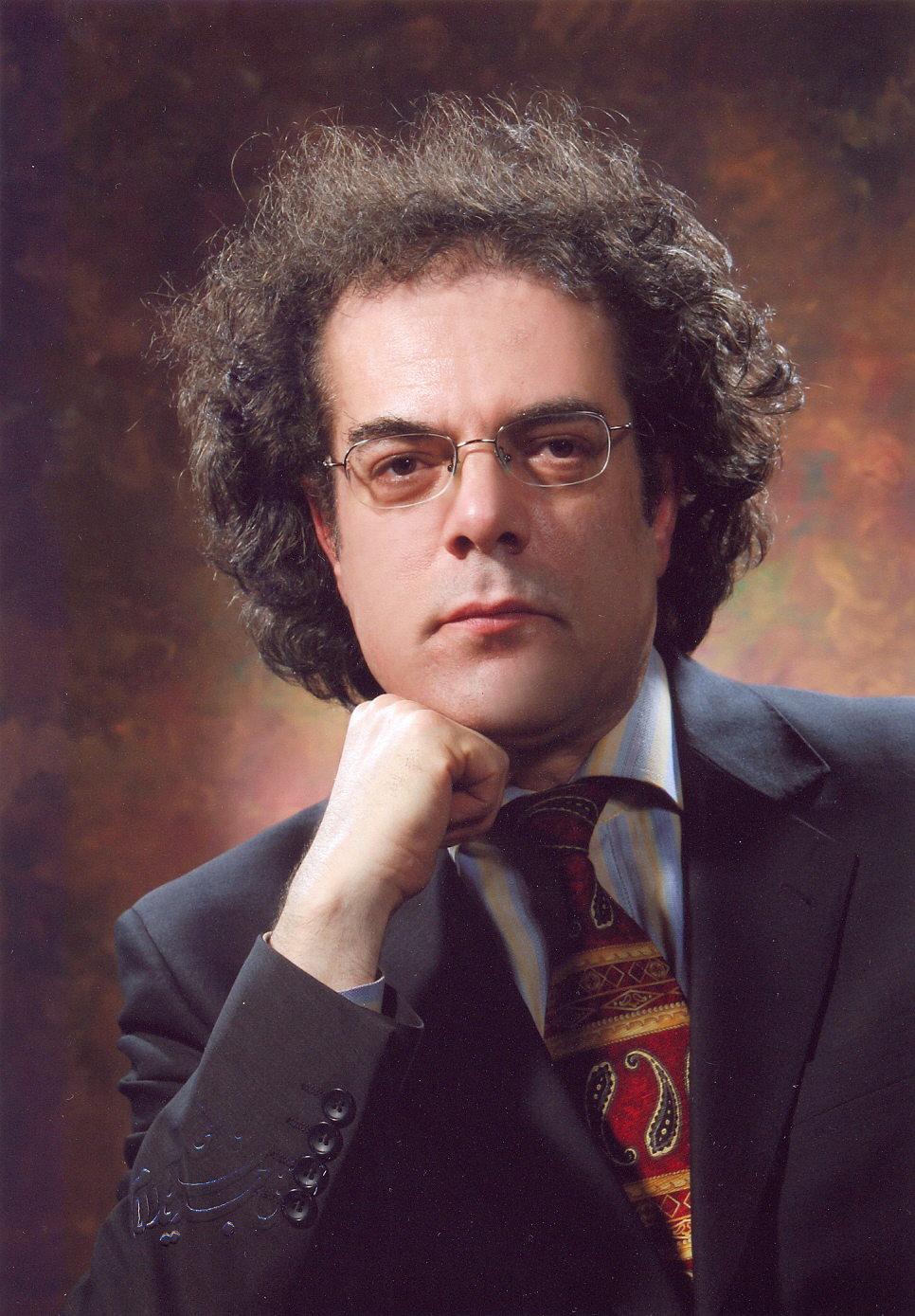

Background information
- Born: Tabriz, Iran
- Genres: Classical
- Occupation: Musician · Professor
- Instruments: Violin
- Website: sol-philharmonic.com

Bahman Mehabadi is an Iranian violinist, music teacher, and composer. He is the founder and the director of SOL Music Center and has devoted his life to classical music. He can be regarded as one of the most versatile violinists of his generation. He has enjoyed great success in SOL Music Ensemble with which he has toured to many of the world's major music centers. He has performed regularly in Europe, North America, and Asia, both as a recitalist and with SOL Music Ensemble. He also performs regularly with orchestras around the world.

== Career ==
Bahman Mehabadi was born in Tabriz, Iran, to a family who deeply loved music, art, and literature. After showing passion for music, 8-year-old Bahman was encouraged by his father and started learning music with his mother, an amateur violinist. He began to study violin at Tabriz Music Art School and continued at Conservatory of Azerbaijan with Professor Zavin Yedigharians. Then he left Iran for higher education in music performance. In a short return to Iran in 1980, he began performing with SOL Quartet which he founded. In another short stay, in 1983, he founded SOL Music Center in Tabriz, which was moved to Tehran after several years of activity. He has often talked about his determination to promote the importance of academic music by establishing SOL Music as a center focusing on classical music education, performing concerts, producing recordings, and publishing articles on the history of classical music and its most influential figures, as well as its literature and concepts; in order to encourage people to listen to different periods of music and to see the music as a science and a philosophy for which long years of persistent practice, experience, and training is required for mastery. In these times, Mehabadi made his debut in Tehran. At the same time, he was the permanent member of Tehran Symphony Orchestra as a violinist, as well as the member of Roudaki Chamber Music Orchestra. Since his debut, Bahman Mehabadi has passionately played throughout all his life and in many countries. In 2004, SOL Music Ensemble was invited to the International Music Festival of Centenar in Oltenia Craiova of Romania, Bahman Mehabadi playing as the soloist of the ensemble. In January 2006, Mehabadi participated in MIDEM (Cannes, France) both as a violinist and as a publisher of classical music recordings. Later in 2006, Bahman Mehabadi was invited to World Philharmonic Orchestra in Paris, an international orchestra consisting of the top musicians from 82 countries and conducted by Yutaka Sado, to mark the first time of Iran being invited to such event. He has worked as violinist, violist, and guitarist and also as a professor at SOL Music Educational Institute and other music schools and academies. He gave masterclasses of introduction to musical elements, forms, and stylistic periods in Iran House of Music once in June 2019 and the other time in September 2023 . He has expanded SOL Music Center continuously to the extent that today it is known as one of the best-established music centers in Iran dedicated to classical music. He has always supported young musicians by instructing and introducing them into SOL Music Ensemble and other music centers of the world. Today, many of his students are performing in different music centers of the world. Mehabadi has recorded more than 19 albums as a soloist and with SOL Music Ensemble. The albums contain pieces from different periods of music. He devotes himself not only to chamber music but with the same success to the solo repertoires. The album named “Mehabadi and J. S.Bach” is the live recording of his performing Bach’s Sonatas and Partitas. A few years later, it was followed by "Recital", the live recording of violin and piano recital by Bahman Mehabadi and Wolf Iysenger, released by SOL Music in Germany in 2020. During the COVID-19 pandemic limitations Mehabadi returned to his solo repertoire, this time for guitar. He arranged, played and recorded some of the best guitar pieces into his latest album, "My Guitar Favourites", which was released by SOL Music in Germany in 2021.

== Discography ==
1. "Summer" (1997) C 2329 Iran, Registration No. of National Library of Iran 5456702
2. "Fall" (1998) C 3232 Iran, Registration No. of National Library of Iran 5456706
3. "Winter" (1999) C 3529 Iran, Registration No. of National Library of Iran 5456708
4. "Gaiety" (2000) C 3530 Iran, Registration No. of National Library of Iran 5456712
5. "Benedictus" (2003) C 3945 Iran, Registration No. of National Library of Iran 3063668
6. "Creation" (2003) C 4097 Iran, Registration No. of National Library of Iran 3050010
7. "Miniature" (2004) C 4409 Iran, Registration No. of National Library of Iran 2961876
8. "Laudation" (2005) C 4826 Iran, Registration No. of National Library of Iran 2961881
9. "Empyrean" (SOL Ensemble's manifesto in commemoration of Mozart 250th Anniversary, 2007) C 5252 Iran, Registration No. of National Library of Iran 2961541
10. "Song of Peace" (2009) C 6054 Iran, Registration No. of National Library of Iran 2961538
11. "The Beyond" (2010) C 6513 Iran, Registration No. of National Library of Iran 2974462
12. "The Apple" (2011) C 6967 Iran, Registration No. of National Library of Iran 2961583
13. "The Strawberry" (2012) C 7351 Iran, Registration No. of National Library of Iran 3183011
14. "Bloom of Colors" (2013) C 91-7686 Iran, Registration No. of National Library of Iran 5412398
15. "Mehabadi & Bach" (Sonatas and Partitas, 2014) C 0-5138-331/2/19/14 Germany, Registration No. of National Library of Iran 5412148
16. "Aura" (2015) C 0-5138-332/10/26/14 Germany, Registration No. of National Library of Iran 5412421
17. "Liebesleid" (2018) C 0-5138-333/1/5/18 Germany, Registration No. of National Library of Iran 5412370
18. "Recital" (2020) C 0-5138-334/23/12/19 Germany
19. "My Guitar Favourites" (2021) C 0-5138-335/20/2/21 Germany

== Books ==
Mehabadi has always been concerned about being up-to-date with the latest and the most efficient music teaching methods. He has written three books for violin, viola, and guitar; each serves as a method for beginners, in order to get the students and the music teachers ready for the approach of The Royal Conservatory of Music's Program:

- Violin Series: Beginners (Violin School), PAu 4-192-372, Registration No. of National Library of Iran 5412793
- Viola Series: Beginners (Viola School), PAu 4-192-344, Registration No. of National Library of Iran 5413033
- Guitar Series: Beginners (Guitar School), PAu 4-192-341, Registration No. of National Library of Iran 5412700

For this sake, he also transcribed necessary concertos and sonatas for viola with his own style of fingerings:

- Viola Series: Viola Concertos & Sonatas (Viola School), PAu 4-180-078, Registration No. of National Library of Iran 5413065

And wrote a Scales Book from Introductory Grade to the 9th (according to the Royal Conservatory of Music's Program), in his own method and fingerings:

- The Complete Viola Technique Book: Viola Series, technical requirements: Intro - 9 (Viola School), PAu 4-174-013, Registration No. of National Library of Iran 5412675

== Articles ==
Mehabadi has written more than 100 articles about art and music, most of which are published in different specialized magazines. From 1990 to 2000, he was the editor of the classical music section of The Art Quarterly magazine (Faslnamye Honar). Many of his articles were published in this magazine; such as:

- Mehabadi, Bahman. "نیکلو پاگانینی [Niccolo Paganini]". فصلنامه هنر [Art Quarterly]. 1989 (17): 212–221. (The Latest Edition)
- Mehabadi, Bahman. "ردلف کریتزر [Rodolphe Kreutzer]". فصلنامه هنر [Art Quarterly]. 1990 (19): 126–133. (The Latest Edition)
- Mehabadi, Bahman. "جیووانی باتیستا ویوتی [Giovanni Battista Viotti]". فصلنامه هنر [Art Quarterly]. 1991 (20): 110–117. (The Latest Edition)
- Mehabadi, Bahman. "پیترو راوللی [Pietro Rovelli]". فصلنامه هنر [Art Quarterly]. Winter & Spring 1992 (21): 64–67. (The Latest Edition)
- Mehabadi, Bahman. "جوزپه تارتینی [Giuseppe Tartini]". فصلنامه هنر [Art Quarterly]. Summer & Autumn 1992 (22): 81–88. شماره کتابشناسی ملی 377-72. (The Latest Edition)
- Mehabadi, Bahman. "آرکانجلو کورلی [Arcangelo Corelli]". فصلنامه هنر [Art Quarterly]. Autumn 1993 (23): 87–96. (The Latest Edition)
- Mehabadi, Bahman. "سویت [Suite]". فصلنامه هنر [Art Quarterly]. Autumn 1993 (23): 97–100. (The Latest Edition)
- Mehabadi, Bahman. "موسیقی آذربایجان به روایت استاد علی سلیمی [Music in Azerbaijan narrated by Ali Salimi]". فصلنامه هنر [Art Quarterly]. Autumn 1993 (23): 101–112. شماره کتابشناسی ملی 14951-72. (The Latest Edition)
- Mehabadi, Bahman. "آنتونیو ویوالدی [Antonio Vivaldi]". فصلنامه هنر [Art Quarterly]. Winter & Spring 1994 (24): 111–123. (The Latest Edition)
- Mehabadi, Bahman. "رهبران بزرگ موسیقی جهان [The Great Conductors of the World]". فصلنامه هنر [Art Quarterly]. Winter & Spring 1994 (24): 124–136.
- Mehabadi, Bahman. "ساز، سبک و فرم‌های موسیقی در ایتالیای کهن [Musical Instrument, Style, and Form in Ancient Italy]". فصلنامه هنر [Art Quarterly]. Winter & Spring 1994 (24): 145–151. (The Latest Edition)
- Mehabadi, Bahman. "پست مدرن و موسیقی [Post-modernism and Music]". فصلنامه هنر [Art Quarterly]. Summer 1994 (25): 107–136. شماره کتابشناسی ملی 6139-73. (The Latest Edition)
  - Mehabadi, Bahman. "پست مدرن و موسیقی [Post-modernism and Music]" (PDF). فصلنامه خانه موسیقی ایران [Iran House of Music Quarterly]. Autumn 2023 (51): 24.
- Mehabadi, Bahman. "زندگی و آثار امین‌الله حسین [Aminoullah (Andre) Hossein]". فصلنامه هنر [Art Quarterly]. Summer 1994 (25): 161–166. شماره کتابشناسی ملی 6142-73. (The Latest Edition)
- Mehabadi, Bahman. "مارک‌های ویولن [Violin Brands]". فصلنامه هنر [Art Quarterly]. Summer 1994 (25): 167–172. (The Latest Edition)
- Mehabadi, Bahman. "ویولن‌های مشهور دنیا [Famous Violins of the World]". فصلنامه هنر [Art Quarterly]. Summer 1994 (25): 173–180. (The Latest Edition)
- Mehabadi, Bahman. "موسیقی مذهبی و فرم‌های رایج آن [Sacred Music and its Most Common Forms]". فصلنامه هنر [Art Quarterly]. Fall 1994 (26): 179–204. شماره کتابشناسی ملی 14979-73. (Part 1: The Latest Edition), (Part 2: The Latest Edition), (Part 3: The Latest Edition), (Part 4: The Latest Edition), (Part 5: The Latest Edition)
- Mehabadi, Bahman. "رکوییم موزار در رِ مینور [Requiem Mass in d minor by Mozart]". فصلنامه هنر [Art Quarterly]. Fall 1994 (26): 233–270. شماره کتابشناسی ملی 14982-73. (The Latest Edition)
- Mehabadi, Bahman. "رئالیسم و اپرای کوراغلو [Realism and Koroglu Opera]". فصلنامه هنر [Art Quarterly]. Winter 1995 (27): 139–162. (The Latest Edition)
- Mehabadi, Bahman. "اکسپرسیونیسم در موسیقی [Expressionism and Music]". فصلنامه هنر [Art Quarterly]. Summer & Fall 1995 (29): 335–349. شماره کتابشناسی ملی 1430-75. (The Latest Edition)
- Mehabadi, Bahman. "آلبان بِرگ و وتسک [Alban Berg Wozzeck]". فصلنامه هنر [Art Quarterly]. Summer & Fall 1995 (29): 350–357. شماره کتابشناسی ملی 1431-75. (The Latest Edition)
- Mehabadi, Bahman. "آنتون وبرن [Anton Webern]". فصلنامه هنر [Art Quarterly]. Summer & Fall 1995 (29): 358–366. شماره کتابشناسی ملی 1432-75. (The Latest Edition)
- Mehabadi, Bahman. "موسیقی ایران، تامل عاشقانه [A Passionate Look at Music in Iran]". فصلنامه هنر [Art Quarterly]. Winter & Spring 1996 (30): 263–284. شماره کتابشناسی ملی 13273-75. (The Latest Edition)
- Mehabadi, Bahman. "برنامه جهانی موسیقی [Music Educational Program]". فصلنامه هنر [Art Quarterly]. Winter & Spring 1996 (30): 305–314. شماره کتابشناسی ملی 13274-75. (The Latest Edition)
- Mehabadi, Bahman. "شگفتی‌های ویولن [Marvels of Violin]". فصلنامه هنر [Art Quarterly]. Winter & Spring 1996 (30): 315–327. شماره کتابشناسی ملی 13275-75. (The Latest Edition)
- Mehabadi, Bahman (October 1375). "موسیقی در تئاتر [Music and Theater]". فصلنامه هنر [Art Quarterly]. Winter & Spring 1997 (32): 346–351. شماره کتابشناسی ملی 6793-76.

During the lifetime of Ahang Music Quarterly, he was the editor of its classical music section. Moreover, he has a few articles about music and theater, including the reviews on “Three Sisters” from Anton Chekhov, “An Enemy of the People” from Henrik Ibsen, etc., all published in Theatre (Namayesh) Monthly Review:

- Mehabadi, Bahman (15 September 1367). "خواهران زشت و زیبای چخوف [The Ugly and Beautiful Sisters of Chekhov]". ماهنامه نمایش [Theatre Monthly Review]. December 1988 (14): 35–39.
- Mehabadi, Bahman (August 1368). "هنریک یوهان ایبسن و دشمن مردم [Henrik Johan Ibsen and An Enemy of the People]". ماهنامه نمایش [Theatre Monthly Review]. November 1989 (25): 30–39.

== Compositions ==
Mehabadi has composed many pieces in different forms for ensemble, which are often played in his concerts with SOL Music Ensemble and other music groups; including “Love of Freedom” , “Sonata in a minor: Nostalgia” (recorded in "Summer", the 1st album), “Lirico”, “Three Movements for Sorrow” , “San Fantasy”, “Romance in G" (recorded in "Liebesleid", the 17th album), “Andre Gide Sonata” (recorded in "Fall", the 2nd album), and “Letter” for piano and string ensemble. Beside his own compositions, he has also arranged many of classical pieces for his ensemble.

== Personal life ==
Poetry and painting are Mehabadi's two main leisure activities. Since a teenager, he has been interested in poetry, like his father who was fond of philosophy and literature, and showed a good talent in this field. This was a beginning for him to write his thoughts into poems throughout his life. Now he has several poetry books of his own in which his life philosophy could be perceived. In 1985 Bahman Mehabadi and Ahad Manteqi collected and published a selection of the poems of their contemporary Iranian poets, in the book "The Voice of the Contemporary Poetry" (Sedaye She're Emrooz):

- Mehabadi, Bahman; Manteqi, Ahad (1985). صدای شعر امروز [The Voice of the Contemporary Poetry]. Tabriz: Talash. ISBN 964-5750-32-6.

At Tabriz Music Art School, Bahman Mehabadi used to take painting classes of Professor Ibrahim Moqbeli. Since then he still paints in Oil Color and Water Color. Today he has around 50 paintings. It was with such a background that he decided to design the cover of many of the SOL Music albums. SOL Music's logo is one of his graphic designs as well.

== See More ==
- About Bahman Mehabadi, his Albums, and Articles' Full Texts
