= Radkan Rural District =

Rural district in Razavi Khorasan province, Iran

Radkan Rural District Persian: دهستان رادكان
- Rural District
- Location within Iran
- Coordinates: 36°55′N 59°05′E
- Country: Iran
- Province: Razavi Khorasan
- County: Chenaran
- District: Radkan
- Established: 1986
- Capital: Marichgan

Population (2016)
  - Total: 14,486
- Time zone: UTC+3:30 (IRST)

Radkan Rural District (Persian: دهستان رادكان) is in Radkan District of Chenaran County, Razavi Khorasan province, Iran. Its capital is the village of Marichgan. The previous capital of the rural district was the village of Radkan.

== Demographics ==
=== Population ===
At the time of the 2006 National Census, the rural district's population was (as a part of the Central District) was 11,188 in 2,780 households. There were 14,908 inhabitants in 3,342 households at the following census of 2011. The 2016 census measured the population of the rural district as 14,486 in 3,320 households. The most populous of its 47 villages was Qezel Hesar (now in Ghiasabad Rural District), with 3,570 people.

In 2020, the rural district was separated from the district in the formation of Radkan District.

=== Other villages in the rural district ===
- Baru
- Dalameh-ye Olya
- Emamzadeh Ebrahim
- Goruh
- Kalateh-ye Sadu
- Kharij
- Moghan
- Qadirabad
- Qoroq
- Radkan
