= Seyyedabad District =

District in Razavi Khorasan province, Iran

Seyyedabad District Persian: بخش سیدآباد
- District
- Location within Iran
- Coordinates: 36°47′N 58°56′E
- Country: Iran
- Province: Razavi Khorasan
- County: Chenaran
- Established: 2020
- Capital: Seyyedabad
- Time zone: UTC+3:30 (IRST)

Seyyedabad District (Persian: بخش سیدآباد) is in Chenaran County, Razavi Khorasan province, Iran. Its capital is the city of Seyyedabad, whose population at the time of the 2016 National Census was 5,312 in 1,564 households.

== History ==
In 2020, Seyyedabad District was formed and divided into the new Hakimabad and Seyyedabad Rural Districts. The village of Seyyedabad was converted to a city in the same year.

== Demographics ==
=== Administrative divisions ===
Seyyedabad District
Administrative Divisions
Hakimabad RD
Seyyedabad RD
Seyyedabad (city) (Note: Became a city after the 2016 census)
RD = Rural District
