= Chenaran Rural District =

Rural district in Razavi Khorasan province, Iran

Chenaran Rural District Persian: دهستان چناران
- Rural District
- Location within Iran
- Coordinates: 36°41′N 59°03′E
- Country: Iran
- Province: Razavi Khorasan
- County: Chenaran
- District: Central
- Established: 1986
- Capital: Kheyrabad

Population (2016)
  - Total: 16,946
- Time zone: UTC+3:30 (IRST)

Chenaran Rural District (Persian: دهستان چناران) is in the Central District of Chenaran County, Razavi Khorasan province, Iran. Its capital is the village of Kheyrabad.

== Demographics ==
=== Population ===
At the time of the 2006 National Census, the rural district's population was 17,109 in 4,261 households. There were 18,153 inhabitants in 5,007 households at the following census of 2011. The 2016 census measured the population of the rural district as 16,946 in 5,005 households. The most populous of its 107 villages was Seyyedabad (now a city in, and the capital of, Seyyedabad District), with 5,312 people.

=== Other villages in the rural district ===
- Dahaneh-ye Akhlamad
- Gaveh-ye Kalateh
- Gaveh-ye Khaleseh
- Khorramabad
- Melli
- Sark
