= Radkan District =

District in Razavi Khorasan province, Iran

Radkan District Persian: بخش رادكان
- District
- Location within Iran
- Coordinates: 36°55′N 59°05′E
- Country: Iran
- Province: Razavi Khorasan
- County: Chenaran
- Established: 2020
- Capital: Radkan
- Time zone: UTC+3:30 (IRST)

Radkan District (Persian: بخش رادكان) is in Chenaran County, Razavi Khorasan province, Iran. Its capital is the village of Radkan, whose population at the time of the 2016 National Census was 2,609 people in 784 households.

== History ==
In 2020, Radkan Rural District was separated from the Central District in the formation of Radkan District.

== Demographics ==
=== Administrative divisions ===
Radkan District
Administrative Divisions
Ghiasabad RD
Radkan RD
RD = Rural District
