= Central District (Chenaran County) =

District in Razavi Khorasan province, Iran

Central District (Chenaran County) Persian: بخش مرکزی شهرستان چناران
- District
- Location within Iran
- Coordinates: 36°41′N 59°05′E
- Country: Iran
- Province: Razavi Khorasan
- County: Chenaran
- Established: 1990
- Capital: Chenaran

Population (2016)
  - Total: 88,581
- Time zone: UTC+3:30 (IRST)

The Central District of Chenaran County (Persian: بخش مرکزی شهرستان چناران) is in Razavi Khorasan province, Iran. Its capital is the city of Chenaran.

== History ==
In 2020, Radkan Rural District was separated from the district in the formation of Radkan District.

== Demographics ==
=== Population ===
At the time of the 2006 National Census, the district's population was 73,977 in 18,137 households. The following census in 2011 counted 84,770 people in 22,527 households. The 2016 census measured the population of the district as 88,581 inhabitants in 24,914 households.

=== Administrative divisions ===
Central District (Chenaran County) Population
Administrative Divisions	2006	2011	2016
Boq Mej RD	3,945	3,142	3,270
Chenaran RD	17,109	18,153	16,946
Radkan RD (Note: Transferred to Radkan District after the 2016 census)	11,188	14,908	14,486
Chenaran (city)	41,735	48,567	53,879
Total	73,977	84,770	88,581
RD = Rural District
