= Binalud =

Binalud (Persian: بينالود) may refer to:

- Binalud, Iran, a new city in Razavi Khorasan province
- Binalud County, the former name of Torqabeh and Shandiz County, Iran
- Binalud Mountains, a mountain range in Iran
- Binalud Rural District, an administrative division of Nishapur County, Iran
- Mount Binalud, a mountain in Iran
