= Golboqra =

Golboqra گل بقرا
- Village
- Location within Iran
- Coordinates: 35°52′31″N 59°25′08″E
- Country: Iran
- Province: Razavi Khorasan
- County: Mashhad
- Bakhsh: Ahmadabad
- Rural District: Piveh Zhan

Population (2006)
  - Total: 338
- Time zone: UTC+3:30 (IRST)
  - Summer (DST): UTC+4:30 (IRDT)

Golboqra (Persian: گل بقرا, also Romanized as Golboqrā and Gol Boghrā) is a village in Piveh Zhan Rural District, Ahmadabad District, Mashhad County, Razavi Khorasan Province, Iran. At the 2006 census, its population was 338, in 82 families.
