= Gownjuk =

Gownjuk or Gavanjuk (Persian: گون جوك) may refer to:

- Gownjuk-e Olya
- Gownjuk-e Sofla
