= Bas Saruq =

Bas Saruq بس ساروق
- Village
- Location within Iran
- Coordinates: 36°09′39″N 59°37′04″E
- Country: Iran
- Province: Razavi Khorasan
- County: Mashhad
- Bakhsh: Ahmadabad
- Rural District: Sarjam

Population (2006)
  - Total: 168
- Time zone: UTC+3:30 (IRST)
  - Summer (DST): UTC+4:30 (IRDT)

Bas Saruq (Persian: بس ساروق, also Romanized as Bās Sārūq; also known as Bas Sārū, Bāsh Sārūq, and Sārūj) is a village in Sarjam Rural District, Ahmadabad District, Mashhad County, Razavi Khorasan Province, Iran. At the 2006 census, its population was 168, in 45 families.
