= Delbaran, Razavi Khorasan =

Delbaran دلبران
- Village
- Location within Iran
- Coordinates: 35°58′50″N 59°28′43″E
- Country: Iran
- Province: Razavi Khorasan
- County: Mashhad
- Bakhsh: Ahmadabad
- Rural District: Piveh Zhan

Population (2006)
  - Total: 52
- Time zone: UTC+3:30 (IRST)
  - Summer (DST): UTC+4:30 (IRDT)

Delbaran (Persian: دلبران, also Romanized as Delbarān) is a village in Piveh Zhan Rural District, Ahmadabad District, Mashhad County, Razavi Khorasan Province, Iran. At the 2006 census, its population was 52, in 17 families.
