= Deh-e Gheybi =

Village in Razavi Khorasan province, Iran

Deh-e Gheybi Persian: ده غيبي
- Village
- Location within Iran
- Coordinates: 36°10′26″N 59°36′23″E
- Country: Iran
- Province: Razavi Khorasan
- County: Mashhad
- District: Ahmadabad
- Rural District: Sarjam

Population (2016)
  - Total: 1,855
- Time zone: UTC+3:30 (IRST)

Deh-e Gheybi (Persian: ده غيبي) (Note: Also romanized as Deh Gheybī and Deh-e Gheybī) is a village in Sarjam Rural District of Ahmadabad District in Mashhad County, Razavi Khorasan province, Iran.

== Demographics ==
=== Population ===
At the time of the 2006 National Census, the village's population was 1,007 in 267 households. The following census in 2011 counted 1,360 people in 384 households. The 2016 census measured the population of the village as 1,855 people in 539 households, the most populous in its rural district.
