= Dizbad-e Sofla =

Village in Razavi Khorasan province, Iran

Dizbad-e Sofla Persian: ديزبادسفلي
- Village
- Location within Iran
- Coordinates: 35°57′33″N 59°12′55″E
- Country: Iran
- Province: Razavi Khorasan
- County: Mashhad
- District: Ahmadabad
- Rural District: Piveh Zhan

Population (2016)
  - Total: 1,254
- Time zone: UTC+3:30 (IRST)

Dizbad-e Sofla (Persian: ديزبادسفلي) (Note: Also romanized as Dīzbād-e Soflá; also known as Dīzābād Pā’īn, Dīzābād-e Pā’īn, Dizbād, Dīzbād-e Pā’īn, Dizbād-i-Pāīn, and Dozdāb-e Pā’īn) is a village in Piveh Zhan Rural District of Ahmadabad District in Mashhad County, Razavi Khorasan province, Iran.

== Demographics ==
=== Population ===
At the time of the 2006 National Census, the village's population was 2,963 in 747 households. The following census in 2011 counted 2,739 people in 782 households. The 2016 census measured the population of the village as 3,254 people in 1,006 households.
