= Hasanabad, Ahmadabad =

Village in Razavi Khorasan province, Iran

Hasanabad Persian: حسن اباد
- Village
- Location within Iran
- Coordinates: 35°55′26″N 59°31′16″E
- Country: Iran
- Province: Razavi Khorasan
- County: Mashhad
- District: Ahmadabad
- Rural District: Sarjam

Population (2016)
  - Total: 713
- Time zone: UTC+3:30 (IRST)

Hasanabad (Persian: حسن اباد) (Note: Also romanized as Ḩasanābād; also known as Ḩasanābād-e Sarjām) is a village in Sarjam Rural District of Ahmadabad District in Mashhad County, Razavi Khorasan province, Iran.

== Demographics ==
=== Population ===
At the time of the 2006 National Census, the village's population was 867 in 235 households. The following census in 2011 counted 359 people in 117 households. The 2016 census measured the population of the village as 713 people in 226 households.
