= Abrash =

Abrash ابرش
- Village
- Location within Iran
- Coordinates: 36°01′18″N 59°24′24″E
- Country: Iran
- Province: Razavi Khorasan
- County: Mashhad
- Bakhsh: Ahmadabad
- Rural District: Piveh Zhan

Population (2016)
  - Total: 398
- Time zone: UTC+3:30 (IRST)
  - Summer (DST): UTC+4:30 (IRDT)

Abrash (Persian: ابرش; also known as Abrashk (Persian: ابرشک), Āvāreshk, and Qal‘eh Amrish) is a village in Piveh Zhan Rural District, Ahmadabad District, Mashhad County, Razavi Khorasan Province, Iran. At the 2006 census, its population was 499, in 139 families.

== See also ==
- List of cities, towns and villages in Razavi Khorasan Province
