= Razun =

Razun (Persian: رزون or رازون) may refer to:

- Razun, Mazandaran (رزون - Razūn)
- Razun, Razavi Khorasan (رازون - Rāzūn)
