= Gownjuk-e Sofla =

Village in Razavi Khorasan, Iran

Gownjuk-e Sofla گون جوك سفلي
- Village
- Location within Iran
- Coordinates: 35°49′57″N 59°13′55″E
- Country: Iran
- Province: Razavi Khorasan
- County: Mashhad
- Bakhsh: Ahmadabad
- Rural District: Piveh Zhan

Population (2006)
  - Total: 71
- Time zone: UTC+3:30 (IRST)
  - Summer (DST): UTC+4:30 (IRDT)

Gownjuk-e Sofla (Persian: گون جوك سفلي, also Romanized as Gownjūk-e Soflá; also known as Dar Ganjak, Dar Ganjak-e Pā’īn, Dar Gonjak-i-Pāīn, Dar Goujak, Gavanjūk-e Pā’īn, and Gavanjūk Soflá) is a village in Piveh Zhan Rural District, Ahmadabad District, Mashhad County, Razavi Khorasan Province, Iran. At the 2006 census, its population was 71, in 21 families.
