= Razun, Razavi Khorasan =

Razun رازون
- Village
- Location within Iran
- Coordinates: 35°56′52″N 59°17′19″E
- Country: Iran
- Province: Razavi Khorasan
- County: Mashhad
- Bakhsh: Ahmadabad
- Rural District: Piveh Zhan

Population (2006)
  - Total: 289
- Time zone: UTC+3:30 (IRST)
  - Summer (DST): UTC+4:30 (IRDT)

Razun (Persian: رازون, also Romanized as Rāzūn; also known as Rāzān) is a village in Piveh Zhan Rural District, Ahmadabad District, Mashhad County, Razavi Khorasan Province, Iran. At the 2006 census, its population was 289, in 73 families.
