= Robat Sefid =

Village in Razavi Khorasan province, Iran

Robat Sefid Persian: رباطسفيد
- Village
- Location within Iran
- Coordinates: 35°46′56″N 59°23′20″E
- Country: Iran
- Province: Razavi Khorasan
- County: Mashhad
- District: Ahmadabad
- Rural District: Piveh Zhan

Population (2016)
  - Total: 2,068
- Time zone: UTC+3:30 (IRST)

Robat Sefid (Persian: رباطسفيد) (Note: Also romanized as Robāţ Sefīd and Robāţ-e Sefīd; also known as Gardaneh-ye Robāţ Sefīd, Ribāt-i-Sefīd, and Robāţ-e Khākestarī) is a village in Piveh Zhan Rural District of Ahmadabad District in Mashhad County, Razavi Khorasan province, Iran.

== Demographics ==
=== Population ===
At the time of the 2006 National Census, the village's population was 1,234 in 329 households. The following census in 2011 counted 1,547 people in 447 households. The 2016 census measured the population of the village as 2,068 people in 639 households.
