= Hoseynabad, Ahmadabad =

Village in Razavi Khorasan province, Iran

Hoseynabad Persian: حسين اباد
- Village
- Location within Iran
- Coordinates: 35°56′58″N 59°18′44″E
- Country: Iran
- Province: Razavi Khorasan
- County: Mashhad
- District: Ahmadabad
- Rural District: Piveh Zhan

Population (2016)
  - Total: 525
- Time zone: UTC+3:30 (IRST)

Hoseynabad (Persian: حسين اباد) (Note: Also romanized as Ḩoseynābād) is a village in Piveh Zhan Rural District of Ahmadabad District in Mashhad County, Razavi Khorasan province, Iran.

== Demographics ==
=== Population ===
At the time of the 2006 National Census, the village's population was 456 in 124 households. The following census in 2011 counted 487 people in 147 households. The 2016 census measured the population of the village as 525 people in 165 households.
