= Bazeh Hur =

Village in Razavi Khorasan province, Iran

Bazeh Hur Persian: بازه حور
- Village
- Location within Iran
- Coordinates: 35°47′23″N 59°22′16″E
- Country: Iran
- Province: Razavi Khorasan
- County: Mashhad
- District: Ahmadabad
- Rural District: Piveh Zhan

Population (2016)
  - Total: 1,279
- Time zone: UTC+3:30 (IRST)

Bazeh Hur (Persian: بازه حور) (Note: Also romanized as Bazeh Hoor and Bāzeh Ḩūr; also known as Bāzeh Khūr, Bāzhū, and Bāz-i-Hūr) is a village in Piveh Zhan Rural District of Ahmadabad District in Mashhad County, Razavi Khorasan province, Iran.

== Demographics ==
=== Population ===
At the time of the 2006 National Census, the village's population was 1,358 in 415 households. The following census in 2011 counted 1,371 people in 463 households. The 2016 census measured the population of the village as 1,279 people in 452 households.
