= Owlang-e Amanabad =

Village in Razavi Khorasan province, Iran

Owlang-e Amanabad Persian: النگ امان اباد
- Village
- Location within Iran
- Coordinates: 36°00′58″N 59°37′50″E
- Country: Iran
- Province: Razavi Khorasan
- County: Mashhad
- District: Ahmadabad
- Rural District: Sarjam

Population (2016)
  - Total: 976
- Time zone: UTC+3:30 (IRST)

Owlang-e Amanabad (Persian: النگ امان اباد) (Note: Also romanized as Owlang-e Amānābād; also known as Owlang) is a village in Sarjam Rural District of Ahmadabad District in Mashhad County, Razavi Khorasan province, Iran.

== Demographics ==
=== Population ===
At the time of the 2006 National Census, the village's population was 707 in 192 households. The following census in 2011 counted 907 people in 252 households. The 2016 census measured the population of the village as 976 people in 278 households.
