= Gownjuk-e Olya =

Gownjuk-e Olya گون جوك عليا
- Village
- Location within Iran
- Coordinates: 35°49′20″N 59°14′31″E
- Country: Iran
- Province: Razavi Khorasan
- County: Mashhad
- Bakhsh: Ahmadabad
- Rural District: Piveh Zhan

Population (2006)
  - Total: 586
- Time zone: UTC+3:30 (IRST)
  - Summer (DST): UTC+4:30 (IRDT)

Gownjuk-e Olya (Persian: گون جوك عليا, also Romanized as Gownjūk-e ‘Olyā; also known as Gavanjūk-e Bālā) is a village in Piveh Zhan Rural District, Ahmadabad District, Mashhad County, Razavi Khorasan Province, Iran. As of the 2006 census, its population was 586, with 147 families.
