= Sar Ghayeh =

Village in Razavi Khorasan province, Iran

Sar Ghayeh Persian: سرغايه
- Village
- Location within Iran
- Coordinates: 35°50′59″N 59°30′45″E
- Country: Iran
- Province: Razavi Khorasan
- County: Mashhad
- District: Ahmadabad
- Rural District: Sarjam

Population (2016)
  - Total: 1,245
- Time zone: UTC+3:30 (IRST)

Sar Ghayeh (Persian: سرغايه) (Note: Also romanized as Sar Ghāyeh; also known as Sar Qāyeh) is a village in Sarjam Rural District of Ahmadabad District in Mashhad County, Razavi Khorasan province, Iran.

== Demographics ==
=== Population ===
At the time of the 2006 National Census, the village's population was 1,231 in 321 households. The following census in 2011 counted 1,086 people in 361 households. The 2016 census measured the population of the village as 1,245 people in 389 households.
