= Emam Taqi =

Village in Razavi Khorasan province, Iran

Emam Taqi Persian: امام تقي
- Village
- Location within Iran
- Coordinates: 35°57′48″N 59°26′27″E
- Country: Iran
- Province: Razavi Khorasan
- County: Mashhad
- District: Ahmadabad
- Rural District: Piveh Zhan

Population (2016)
  - Total: 924
- Time zone: UTC+3:30 (IRST)

Emam Taqi (Persian: امام تقي) (Note: Also romanized as Emām Taqī; also known as Shāh Takī,Shāh Taqī, and Shāh Taqī-ye Pīveh Zhan) is a village in, and the capital of, Piveh Zhan Rural District in Ahmadabad District of Mashhad County, Razavi Khorasan province, Iran.

== Demographics ==
=== Population ===
At the time of the 2006 National Census, the village's population was 675 in 192 households. The following census in 2011 counted 618 people in 188 households. The 2016 census measured the population of the village as 924 people in 199 households.
