= Deh Sorkh, Ahmadabad =

Village in Razavi Khorasan province, Iran

Deh Sorkh Persian: ده سرخ
- Village
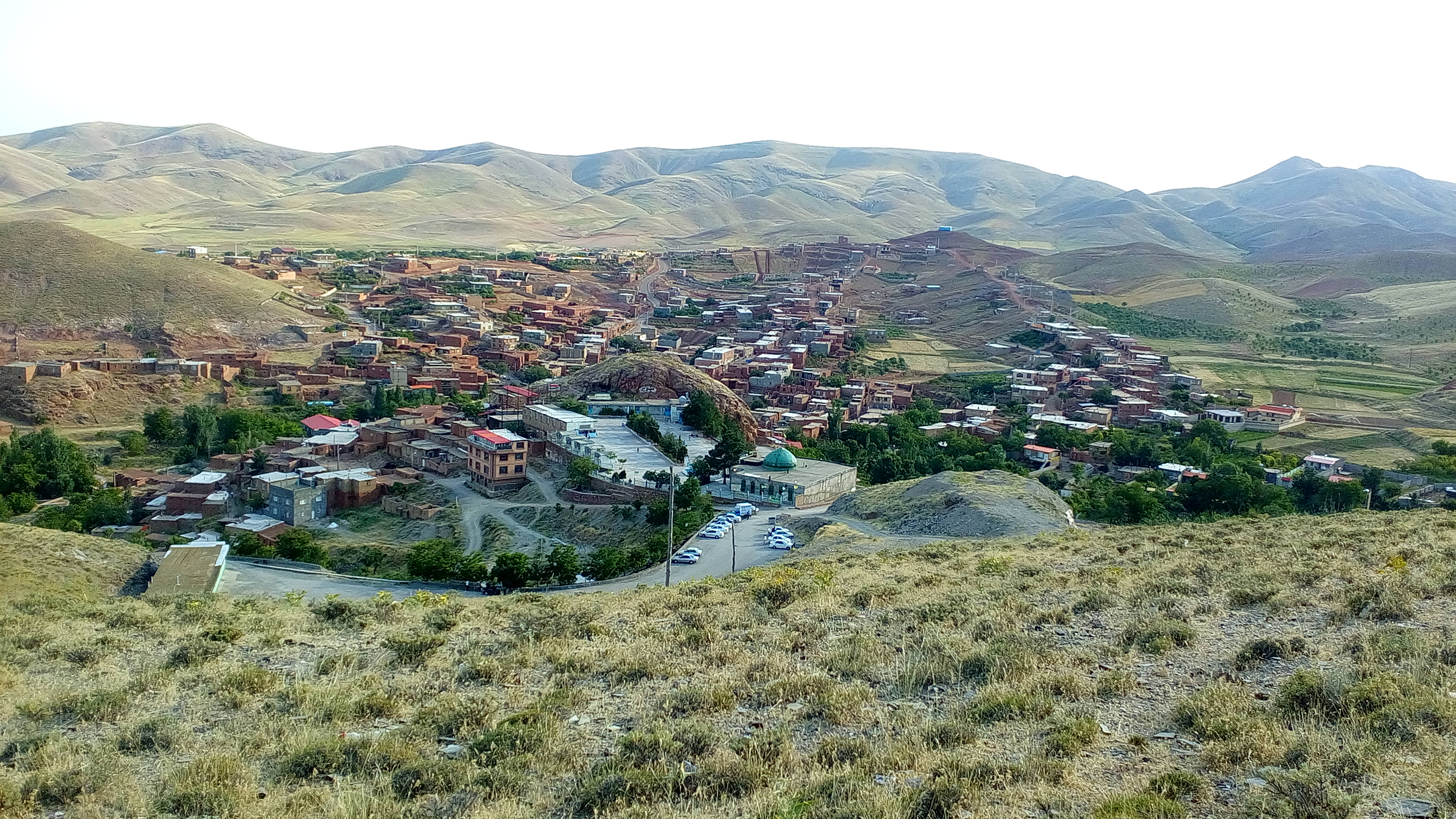
- The village of Deh Sorkh

- Location within Iran
- Coordinates: 36°02′46″N 59°27′32″E
- Country: Iran
- Province: Razavi Khorasan
- County: Mashhad
- District: Ahmadabad
- Rural District: Sarjam

Population (2016)
  - Total: 408
- Time zone: UTC+3:30 (IRST)

Deh Sorkh (Persian: ده سرخ) (Note: Also known as Deh Sork) is a village in Sarjam Rural District of Ahmadabad District in Mashhad County, Razavi Khorasan province, Iran.

== Demographics ==
=== Population ===
At the time of the 2006 National Census, the village's population was 570 in 162 households. The following census in 2011 counted 453 people in 156 households. The 2016 census measured the population of the village as 408 people in 138 households.

== Imam Reza's visit ==
Imam Reza stopped at Deh Sorkh during his travel from Medina to Khorasan. Shaykh al-Ṣadūq recounts the story of Imam's arrival in the village as follows: "The caravan entered the village. It was said to him, It is noon; will you perform the prayer? The Imam dismounted and said, Bring me some water. They replied: O son of the Messenger of God, we have no water with us. The Imam then touched the ground with his hand, and water appeared. He and his companions performed ablution with it, and they prayed on a raised spot beside it."

Today, this very location is a pilgrimage site. It is considered the main place of visitation in Deh Sorkh, as it is rare for visitors to enter the village without heading toward this shrine. This spring has also been noted in other travel accounts. Among them is the travelogue of Nāṣer al-Dīn Shah Qajar, who wrote that "this spring, known as the Spring of Reza, irrigates eight pairs of farmlands. Its water is warm in both winter and summer. Every year, people offer sacrifices there, and anyone afflicted with illness is healed through the blessing of Imam Reza". At the time of Imam Reza's visit, the village had twenty households, and its lands comprised eight pairs of estates.
