= Abrash (disambiguation) =

Abrash is a village in Mashhad County, Razavi Khorasan Province, Iran.

Abrash or Al-Abrash may also refer to:

- Jadhima al-Abrash, 3rd-century Arab king of the Tanûkhids
- Mahmoud al-Abrash (born 1944), Syrian politician
- Michael Abrash, American programmer and technical writer who worked at id Software and Oculus VR
- al-Abrash river, near Tell Kazel, Tartus Governorate, Syria
- Abrash, color variations in the dyed wool of Oriental rugs

== See also ==
- Al-Atrash, a Druze clan in southwestern Syria
