= Piveh Zhan =

Village in Razavi Khorasan province, Iran

Piveh Zhan Persian: پيوه ژن
- Village
- Location within Iran
- Coordinates: 36°03′23″N 59°20′55″E
- Country: Iran
- Province: Razavi Khorasan
- County: Mashhad
- District: Ahmadabad
- Rural District: Piveh Zhan

Population (2016)
  - Total: 733
- Time zone: UTC+3:30 (IRST)

Piveh Zhan (Persian: پيوه ژن) (Note: Also romanized as Pīveh Zhan; also known as Bivāzhān) is a village in Piveh Zhan Rural District of Ahmadabad District in Mashhad County, Razavi Khorasan province, Iran.

== Demographics ==
=== Population ===
At the time of the 2006 National Census, the village's population was 891 in 315 households. The following census in 2011 counted 668 people in 255 households. The 2016 census measured the population of the village as 733 people in 287 households.
