= Avareshk =

Village in Razavi Khorasan province, Iran

Avareshk Persian: اوارشك
- Village
- Location within Iran
- Coordinates: 35°58′28″N 59°22′10″E
- Country: Iran
- Province: Razavi Khorasan
- County: Mashhad
- District: Ahmadabad
- Rural District: Piveh Zhan

Population (2016)
  - Total: 4,262
- Time zone: UTC+3:30 (IRST)

Avareshk (Persian: اوارشك) (Note: Also romanized as Āvāreshk; also known as Sherkat-e Omran Shahr-e Jadid-e Binalud (شرکت عمران شهر جديد بينالود) (English: Binalud New City Development Company)) is a village in Piveh Zhan Rural District of Ahmadabad District in Mashhad County, Razavi Khorasan province, Iran.

== Demographics ==
=== Population ===
At the time of the 2006 National Census, the village's population, as Avareshk, was 1,810 in 501 households. The following census in 2011 counted 2,535 people in 802 households. The 2016 census measured the population of the village as 4,262 people in 1,312 households, when it was listed as Sherkat-e Omran Shahr-e Jadid-e Binalud. It was the most populous in its rural district.

== See also ==
- Binalud
