= Seydabad, Ahmadabad =

Village in Razavi Khorasan province, Iran

Seydabad Persian: صيداباد
- Village
- Location within Iran
- Coordinates: 35°56′39″N 59°21′37″E
- Country: Iran
- Province: Razavi Khorasan
- County: Mashhad
- District: Ahmadabad
- Rural District: Piveh Zhan

Population (2016)
  - Total: 770
- Time zone: UTC+3:30 (IRST)

Seydabad (Persian: صيداباد) (Note: Also romanized as Seydābād, Seyyedabad, and Seyyedābād) is a village in Piveh Zhan Rural District of Ahmadabad District in Mashhad County, Razavi Khorasan province, Iran.

== Demographics ==
=== Population ===
At the time of the 2006 National Census, the village's population was 776 in 192 households. The following census in 2011 counted 871 people in 251 households. The 2016 census measured the population of the village as 770 people in 231 households.
