= Arfi =

Arfi or ARFI may refer to:

- Acoustic radiation force impulse imaging, a type of ultrasound elastography
- Arfi Lamba, an Indian-born actor, producer, entertainer, philosopher, and humanist
- Said Arfi, a Tanzanian politician
- Orfi, a village in Iran that is also known as Arfi
