= Kaj Olang =

Village in Razavi Khorasan province, Iran

Kaj Olang Persian: كج النگ
- Village
- Location within Iran
- Coordinates: 35°45′45″N 59°26′29″E
- Country: Iran
- Province: Razavi Khorasan
- County: Mashhad
- District: Ahmadabad
- Rural District: Piveh Zhan

Population (2016)
  - Total: 615
- Time zone: UTC+3:30 (IRST)

Kaj Olang (Persian: كج النگ) (Note: Also romanized as Kaj Alang) is a village in Piveh Zhan Rural District of Ahmadabad District in Mashhad County, Razavi Khorasan province, Iran.

== Demographics ==
=== Population ===
At the time of the 2006 National Census, the village's population was 629 in 150 households. The following census in 2011 counted 577 people in 169 households. The 2016 census measured the population of the village as 615 people in 177 households.
