= Janid (disambiguation) =

Janid (Janid Ortiz) is a Puerto Rican singer, songwriter, actress and reality TV star.

Janid may also refer to:

- Janid dynasty, of the Khanate of Bukhara in the 17th and 18th centuries
- Janid Deraz, a village in Sarjam Rural District, Iran
