= Soltanabad-e Namak =

Village in Razavi Khorasan province, Iran

Soltanabad-e Namak Persian: سلطان ابادنمك
- Village
- Location within Iran
- Coordinates: 35°54′29″N 59°17′22″E
- Country: Iran
- Province: Razavi Khorasan
- County: Mashhad
- District: Ahmadabad
- Rural District: Piveh Zhan

Population (2016)
  - Total: 2,112
- Time zone: UTC+3:30 (IRST)

Soltanabad-e Namak (Persian: سلطان ابادنمك) (Note: Also romanized as Solţānābād-e Namaḵ; also known as Solţānābād and Sultanābād) is a village in Piveh Zhan Rural District of Ahmadabad District in Mashhad County, Razavi Khorasan province, Iran.

== Demographics ==
=== Population ===
At the time of the 2006 National Census, the village's population was 1,778 in 427 households. The following census in 2011 counted 1,867 people in 511 households. The 2016 census measured the population of the village as 2,112 people in 602 households.
