= Binalud, Iran =

City in Razavi Khorasan province, Iran

Binalud Persian: بینالود
- City
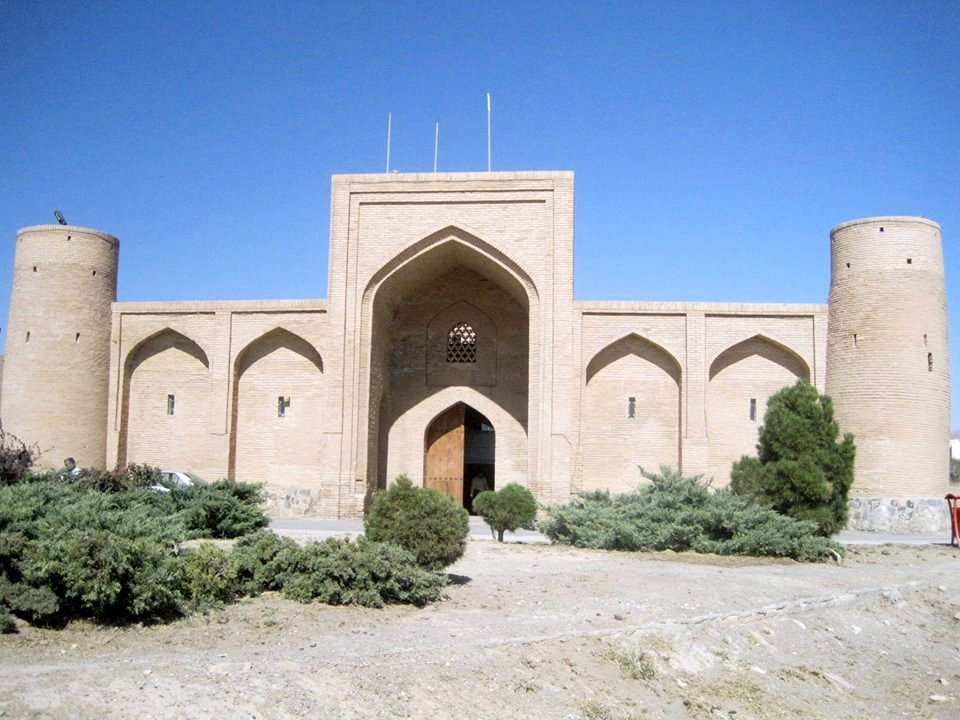
- Fakh-e Davud Caravanserai in Binalud

- Location within Iran
- Coordinates: 35°58′55″N 59°21′55″E
- Country: Iran
- Province: Razavi Khorasan
- County: Mashhad
- District: Ahmadabad
- Elevation: 1,370 to 1,530 m (4,490 to 5,020 ft)
- Time zone: UTC+3:30 (IRST)

Binalud (Persian: بینالود) (Note: Also romanized as Binalood) is a city in Ahmadabad District of Mashhad County, Razavi Khorasan province, Iran. Along with Golbahar, Binalud is one of the two planned cities of the province.

== Etymology ==
The city is named after Mount Binalud.

== History ==
The Binalud New City Development Company (شرکت عمران شهر جديد بينالود), as a state-owned company and a subsidiary of the Ministry of Roads and Urban Development, took over the design and construction of the new city on 24 February 1992 as the executor of the city. The master plan for the new city of Binalud was approved by the Supreme Council of Architecture and Urban Development (شورای ‌عالی‌ معماری‌ و شهرسازی) of the country on 19 March 2003, and was notified for implementation in 2006 by the then Minister of Housing and Urban Development. The Binalud New City Development Company is in charge of the construction of this industrial and residential city using "the latest achievements and new technology in urban planning and architecture, and utilizing experienced engineers and consultants."

== Geography ==
It has an area of about 3,300 hectares (8,200 acres), of which 1,100 hectares (2,700 acres) are residential. The city of Binalud is situated near the south-eastern foot of Binalud Mountain Range. The city is located 66.5 kilometres (41.3 mi) away from the city of Nishapur, the third largest city of the Eastern Provinces of Iran and 66 kilometres (41 mi) away from Mashhad, the second largest city of the country.

== Economy ==
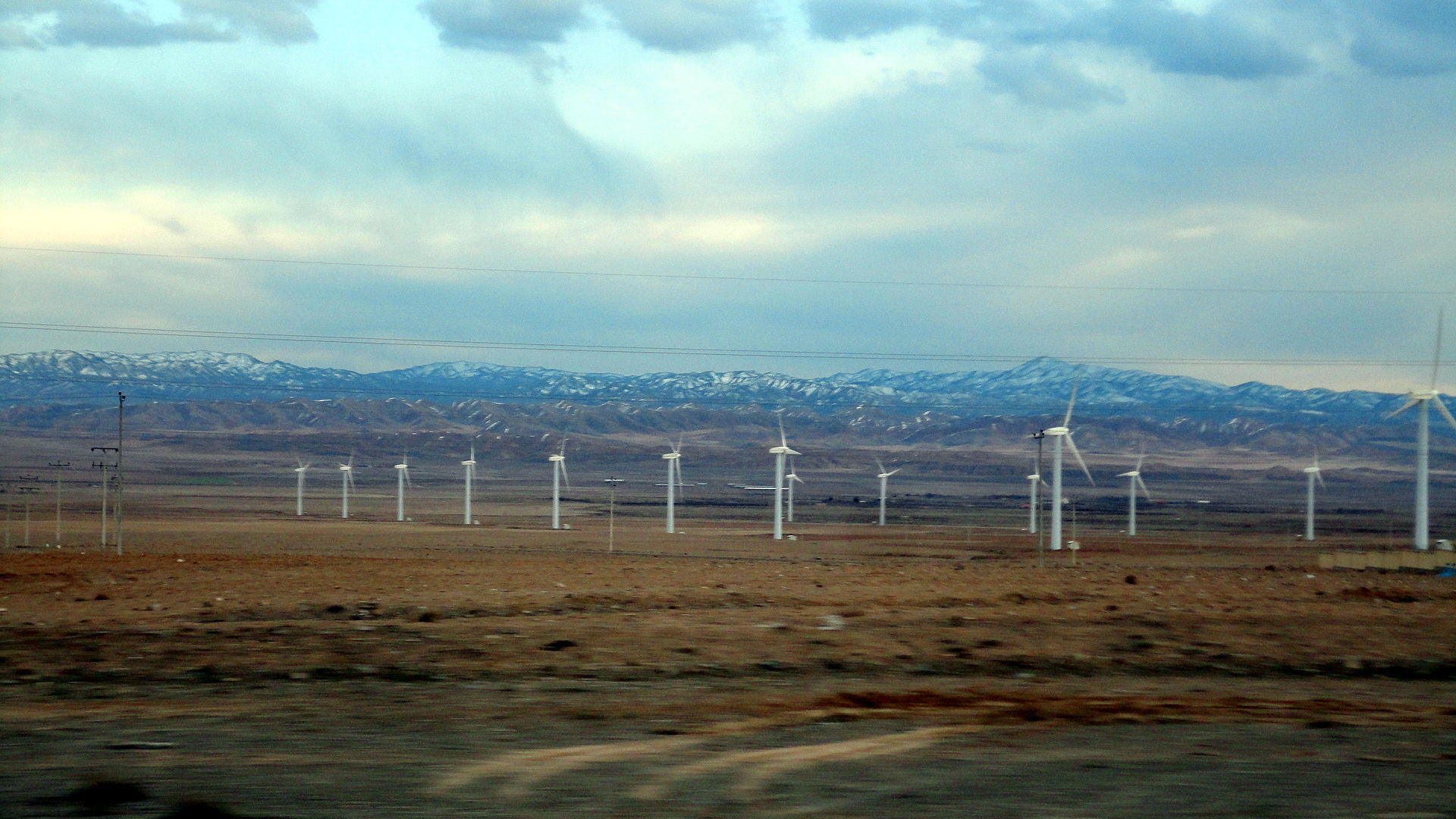
Binalud Wind Farm

The city's economy is dependent on Binalood Wind Farm and IKCO Kohrasan.

== Transportation ==
With the help of Road 44, this city is located near the intersection of this road with two main national roads of 97 and 95. The two bigger cities of Mashhad and Nishapur are also the closest vital cities of the country to this city. This city is also connected to the Iran's train network.

== See also ==
- Avareshk
- Mashhad
- Nishapur
