= Malekabad, Mashhad =

City in Razavi Khorasan province, Iran

Molkabad Persian: ملك آباد
- City
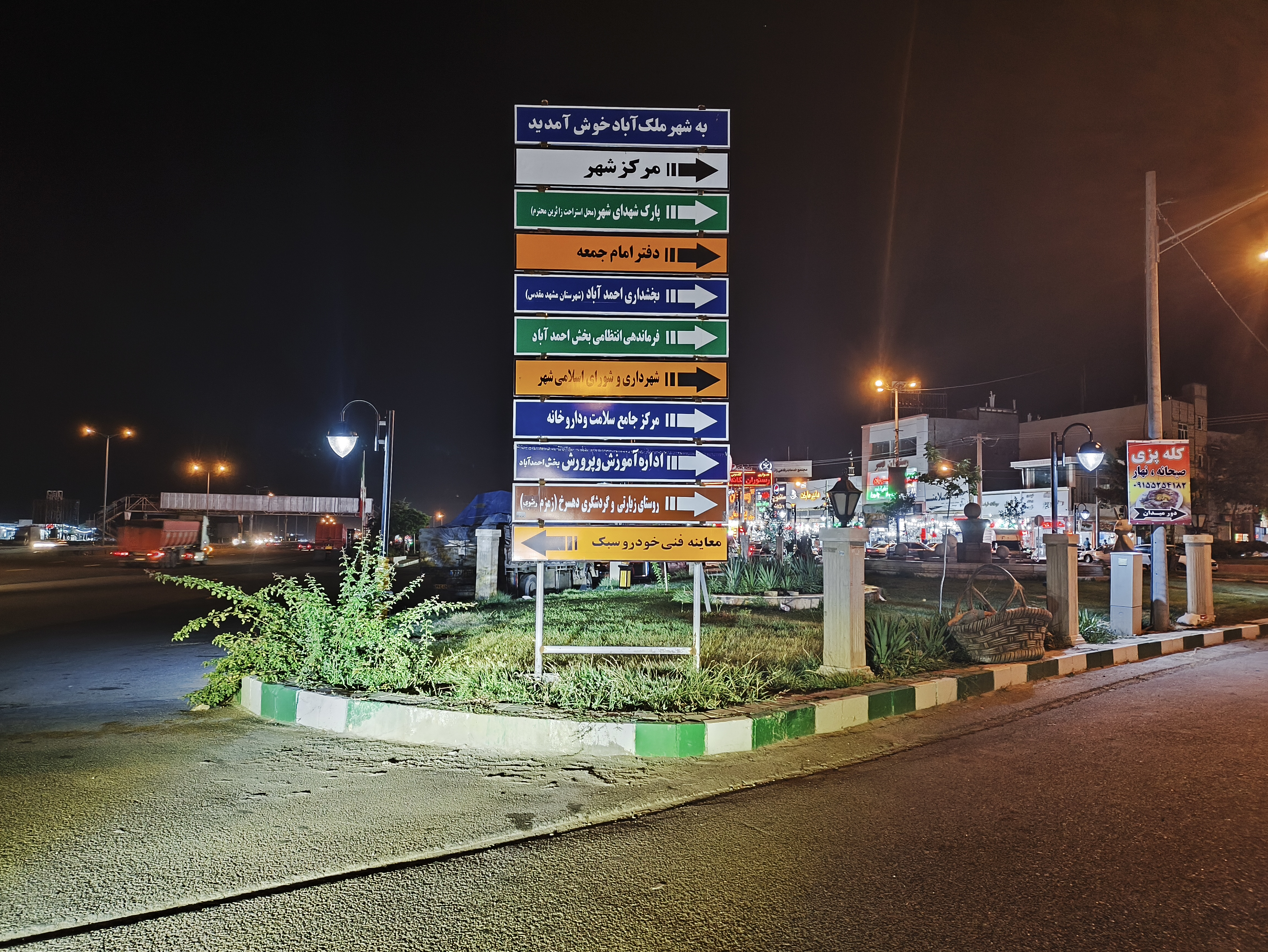
- A square in the city of Malekabad

- Location within Iran
- Coordinates: 35°59′56″N 59°35′33″E
- Country: Iran
- Province: Razavi Khorasan
- County: Mashhad
- District: Ahmadabad

Population (2016)
  - Total: 2,056
- Time zone: UTC+3:30 (IRST)

Malekabad (Persian: ملك آباد) (Note: Also romanized as Malekābād, Molkabad, and Molkābād) is a city in, and the capital of, Ahmadabad District in Mashhad County, Razavi Khorasan province, Iran. It also serves as the administrative center for Sarjam Rural District.

== Demographics ==
=== Population ===
At the time of the 2006 National Census, the city's population was 1,161 in 302 households. The following census in 2011 counted 1,487 people in 406 households. The 2016 census measured the population of the city as 2,056 people in 620 households.
