= Janid Deraz =

Village in Razavi Khorasan province, Iran

Janid Deraz Persian: جنيد دراز
- Village
- Location within Iran
- Coordinates: 36°00′36″N 59°31′50″E
- Country: Iran
- Province: Razavi Khorasan
- County: Mashhad
- District: Ahmadabad
- Rural District: Sarjam

Population (2016)
  - Total: 454
- Time zone: UTC+3:30 (IRST)

Janid Deraz (Persian: جنيد دراز) (Note: Also romanized as Janīd Derāz; also known as Gonbad Derāz (گنبددراز) and Gonbad-e Derāz) is a village in Sarjam Rural District of Ahmadabad District in Mashhad County, Razavi Khorasan province, Iran.

== Demographics ==
=== Population ===
At the time of the 2006 National Census, the village's population was 355 in 94 households. The following census in 2011 counted 803 people in 236 households. The 2016 census measured the population of the village as 454 people in 135 households.
