= Orfi, Mashhad =

Village in Razavi Khorasan province, Iran

Orfi Persian: عارفي
- Village
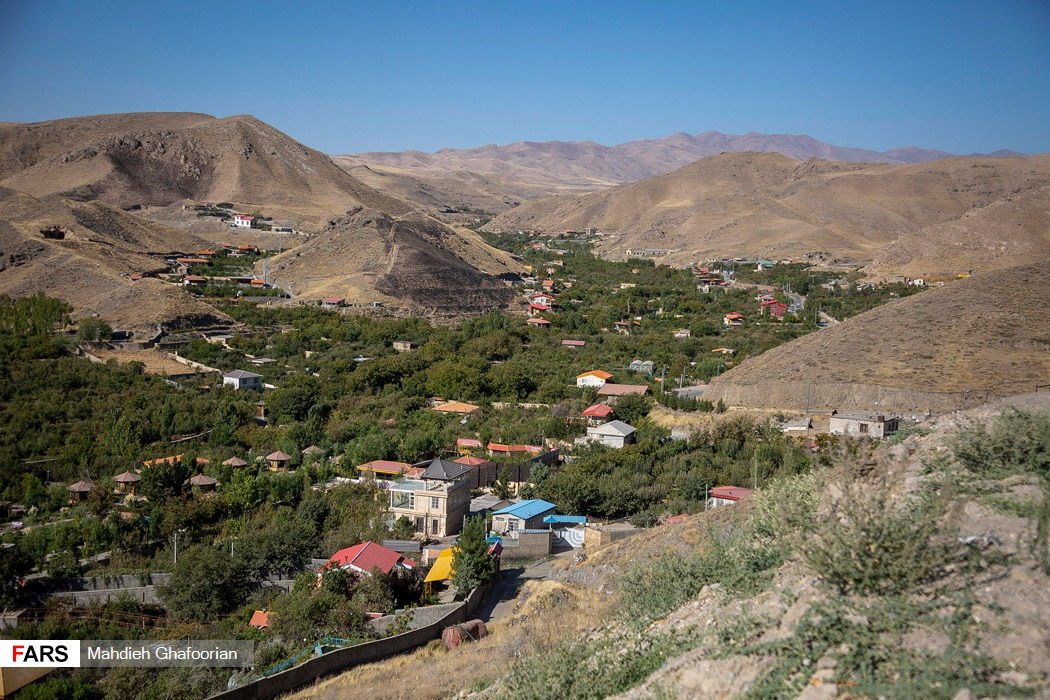
- The village of Orfi

- Location within Iran
- Coordinates: 36°07′44″N 59°31′22″E
- Country: Iran
- Province: Razavi Khorasan
- County: Mashhad
- District: Ahmadabad
- Rural District: Sarjam

Population (2016)
  - Total: 442
- Time zone: UTC+3:30 (IRST)

Orfi (Persian: عارفي) (Note: Also romanized as ‘Orfī; also known as ‘Alafī and Arfī (ارفي)) is a village in Sarjam Rural District of Ahmadabad District in Mashhad County, Razavi Khorasan province, Iran.

== Demographics ==
=== Population ===
At the time of the 2006 National Census, the village's population was 381 in 99 households. The following census in 2011 counted 403 people in 112 households. The 2016 census measured the population of the village as 442 people in 131 households.
