= Binalud Mountains =

Mountain range In Iran

Binalud Mountain Range
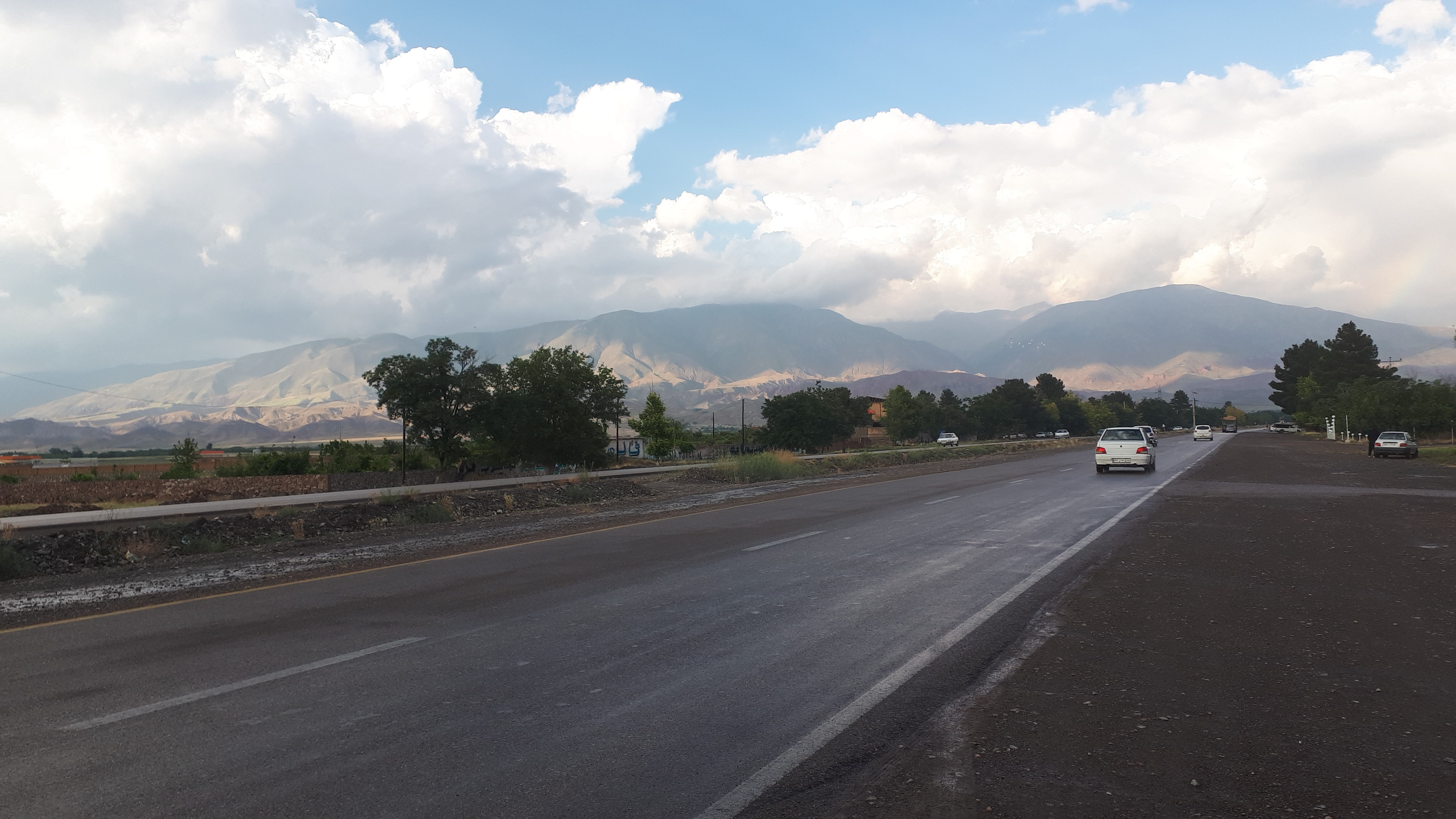
- View of Binalud Mountain Range from Baghrud Road of Neyshabur (January 2019)

Highest point
- Peak: Mount Binalud
- Elevation: 3,211 m (10,535 ft)
- Coordinates: 36°18′N 59°00′E

Naming
- Native name: رشته کوه بینالود (Persian)

Geography
- Location within Iran
- Location: A natural border between the cities of Nishapur and Mashhad

The Binalud (Persian: بینالود, pronounced [ˌbiːnɒːˈluːd]) is a mountain range that runs in a northwest-southeast direction between the Nishapur and Mashhad regions in Razavi Khorasan Province in northeastern Iran, to the southeast of the Caspian Sea. Although far from the Aladagh Mountains, which lie to the northwest in the Province of North Khorasan, the Binalud Mountains are located in such a way that both the Aladagh Mountains and the Binalud Range lie approximately in the same arc, curving from the northwest to the southeast. The city of Mashhad is located in the northeastern part of the Binalud Range, and the city of Nishapur or Neyshabur lies on the southwestern section of the range. Situated somewhat to the west of the Binalud Range proper, and with an elevation of 3,211 metres, Mount Binalud is the highest point both of the Binalud Mountains and of Razavi Khorasan Province as a whole.

== Geology ==
Map of Iran with Kopet Dag in northeast

The mountain range was formed mainly in the Miocene and the Pliocene during the Alpine orogeny and is made predominantly of Triassic and Jurassic rocks, with chiefly Jurassic rocks in the northwestern part and a smaller portion of Paleozoic rocks in the western section. On the southern margin of the range and along the same northwest-southeast direction, there is a strip of Eocene rocks. On the northwestern side of this strip, there is another section of Eocene rocks that are volcanic in origin. The well-known Nishabur turquoise comes from the weathered and broken trachytes and andesites of the Eocene volcanic rocks of this part of the mountain range. The main turquoise mines are situated about 50 kilometres northwest of the city of Nishapur in the vicinity of a village called Madan.

The mountains form part of the faulting resulting from the collision of the Arabian Plate with the Eurasian Plate. The range takes up the motion of Central Iran on the Arabian plate at the rate of 4.0 ± 1.3 mm (0.157 ± 0.051 in) per year.

== Gallery of the southern foothill ==
=== Images ===
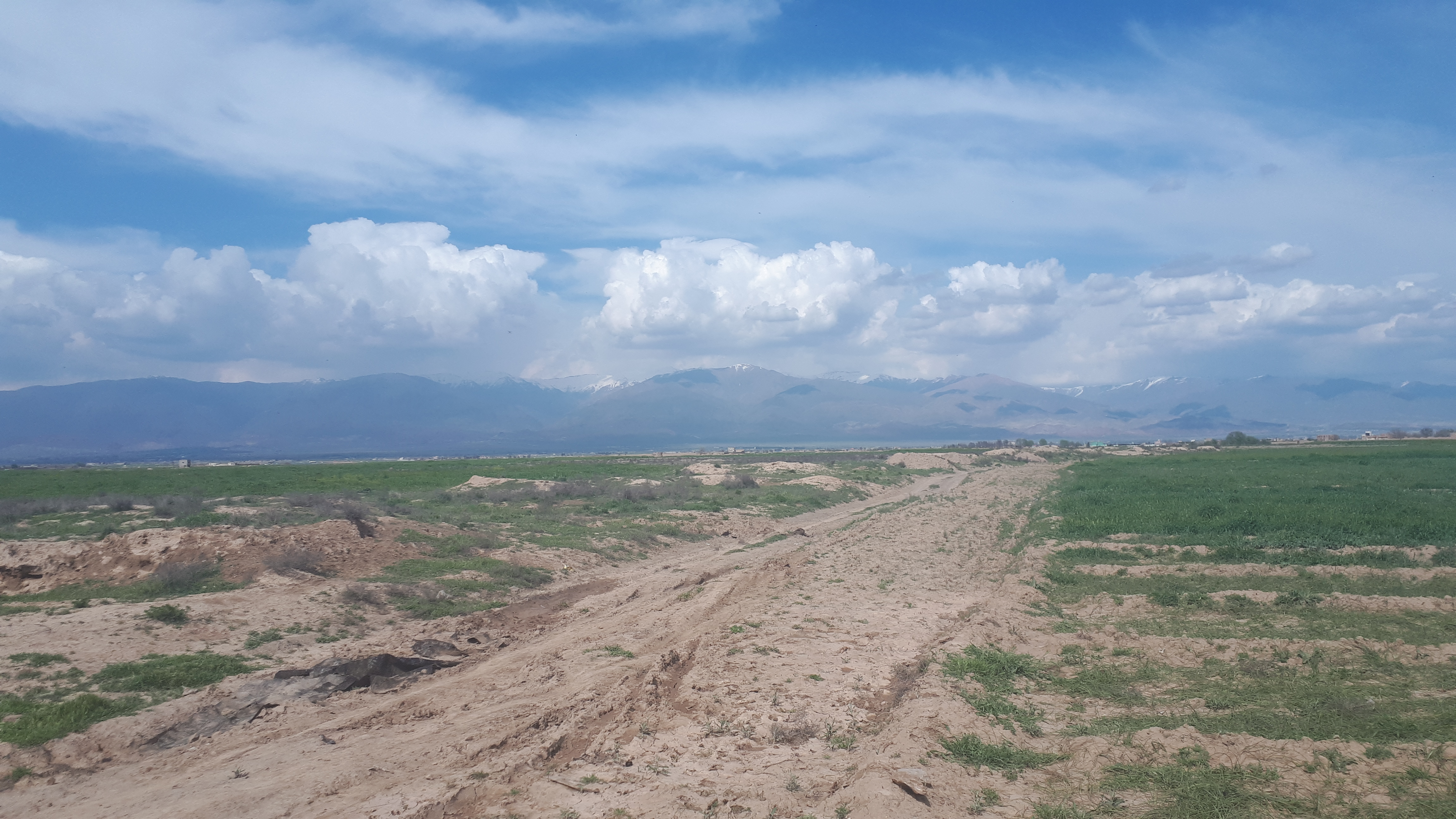
A view of Binalud Mountain Range from the southern plain of the city of Neyshabur, April 2020

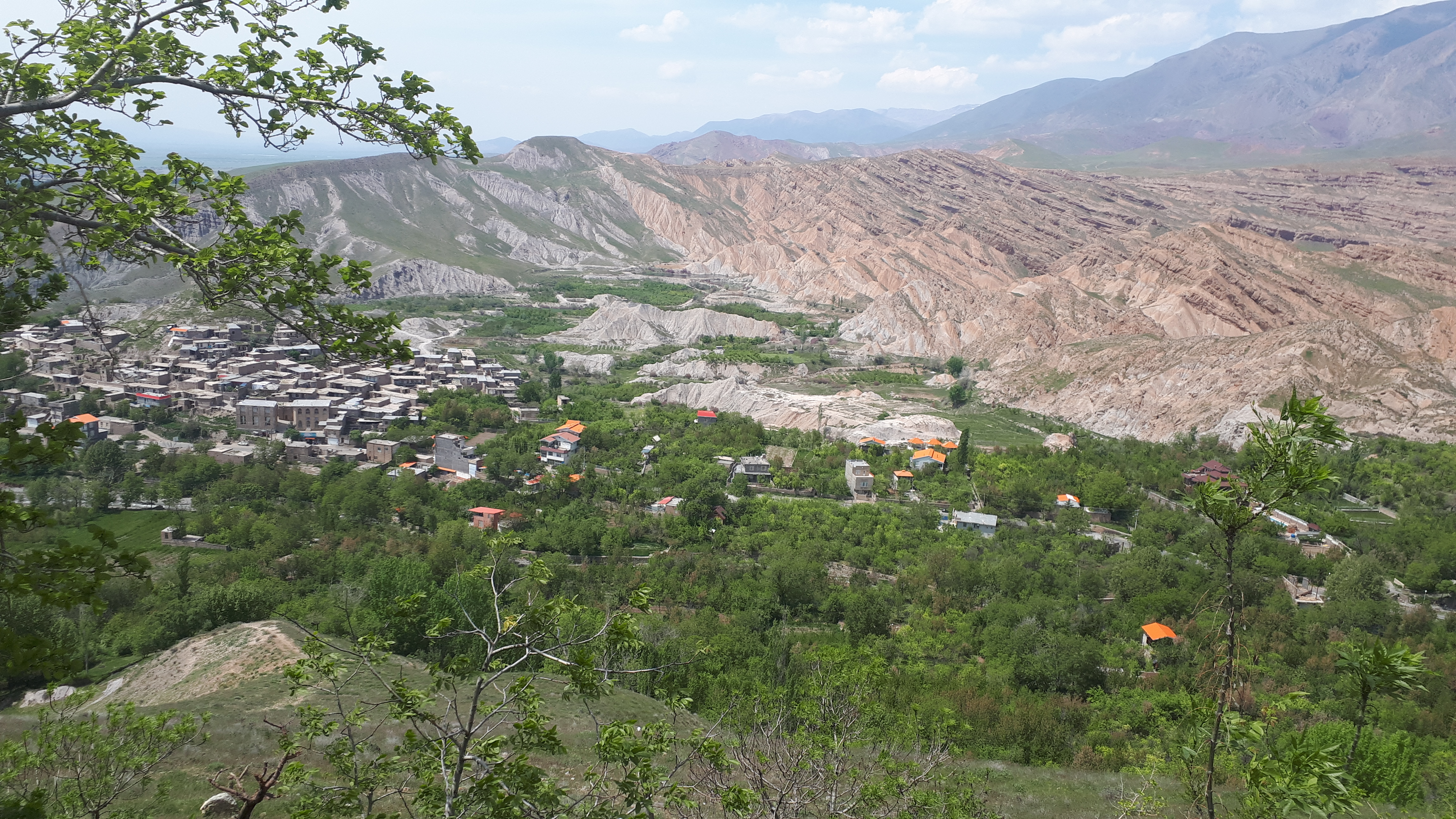
Village of Buzhan, Neyshabur (April 2019). This village is situated on the southern foothill of this mountain range.

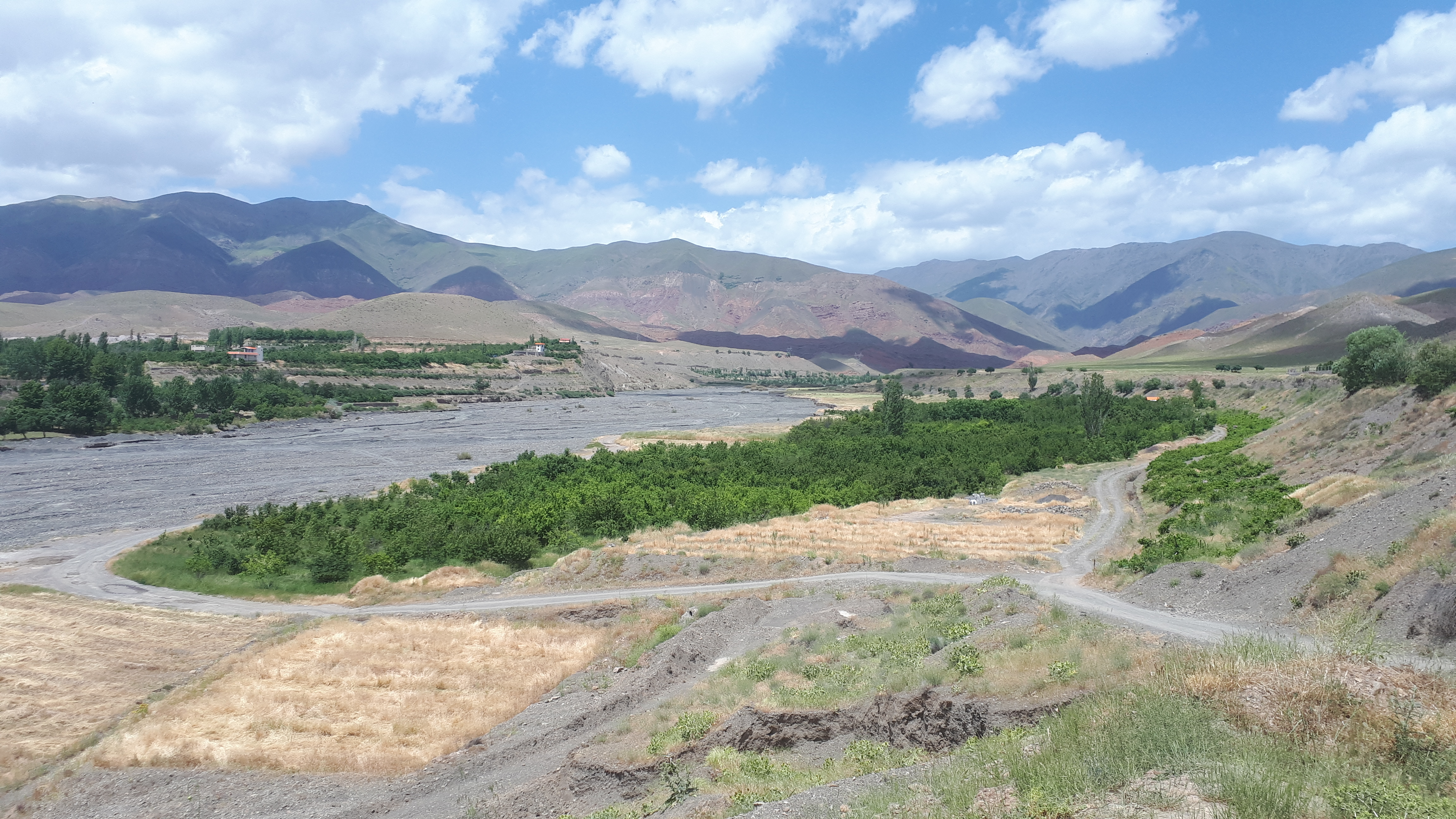
Village of Eyshabad, Neyshabur (May 2019). This village is situated on the southern foothill of this mountain range.

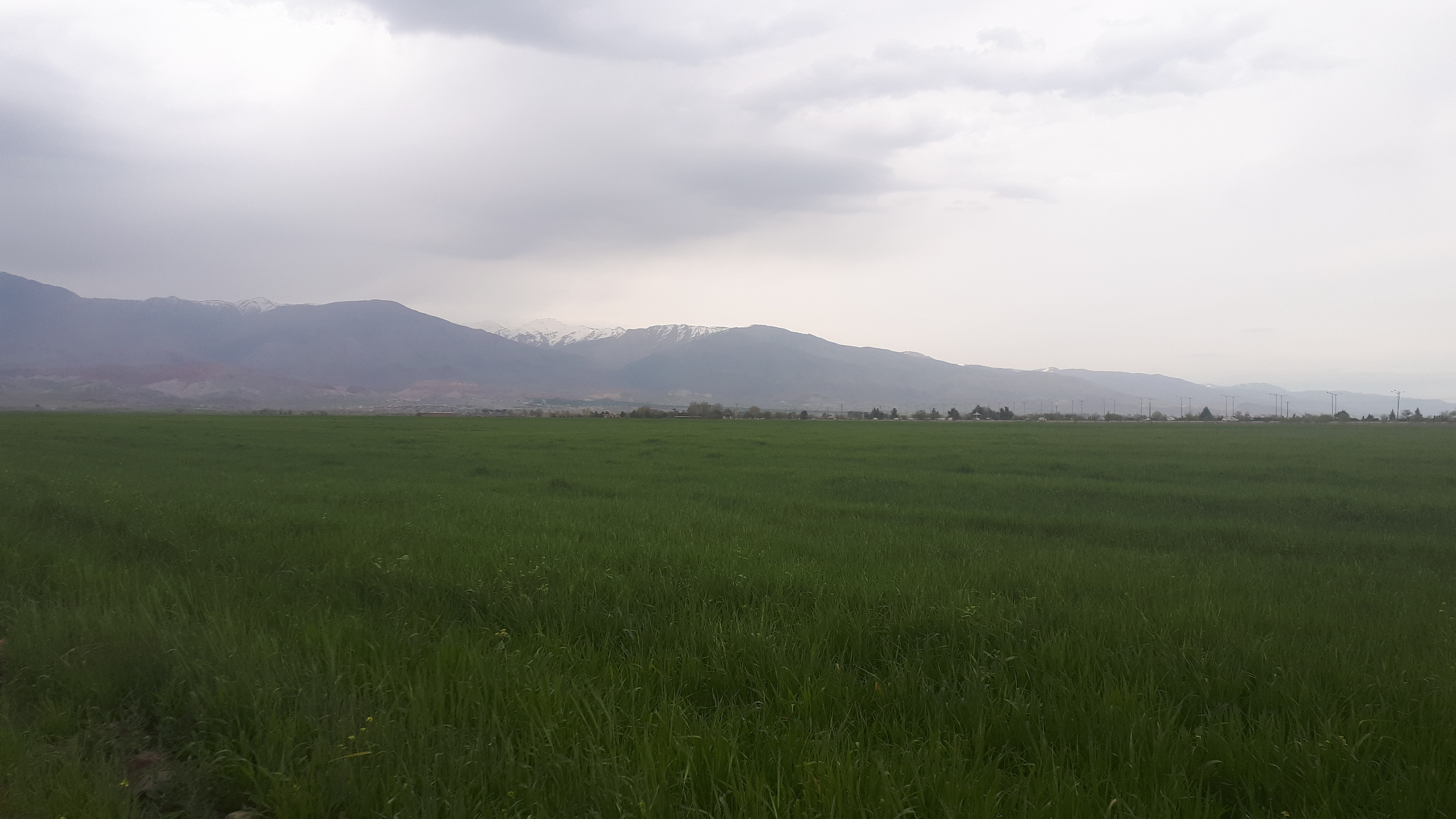
View of Binalud Mountain Range & Baghrud Road (zone) of Neyshabur from the district 1 of the city. (April 2020)

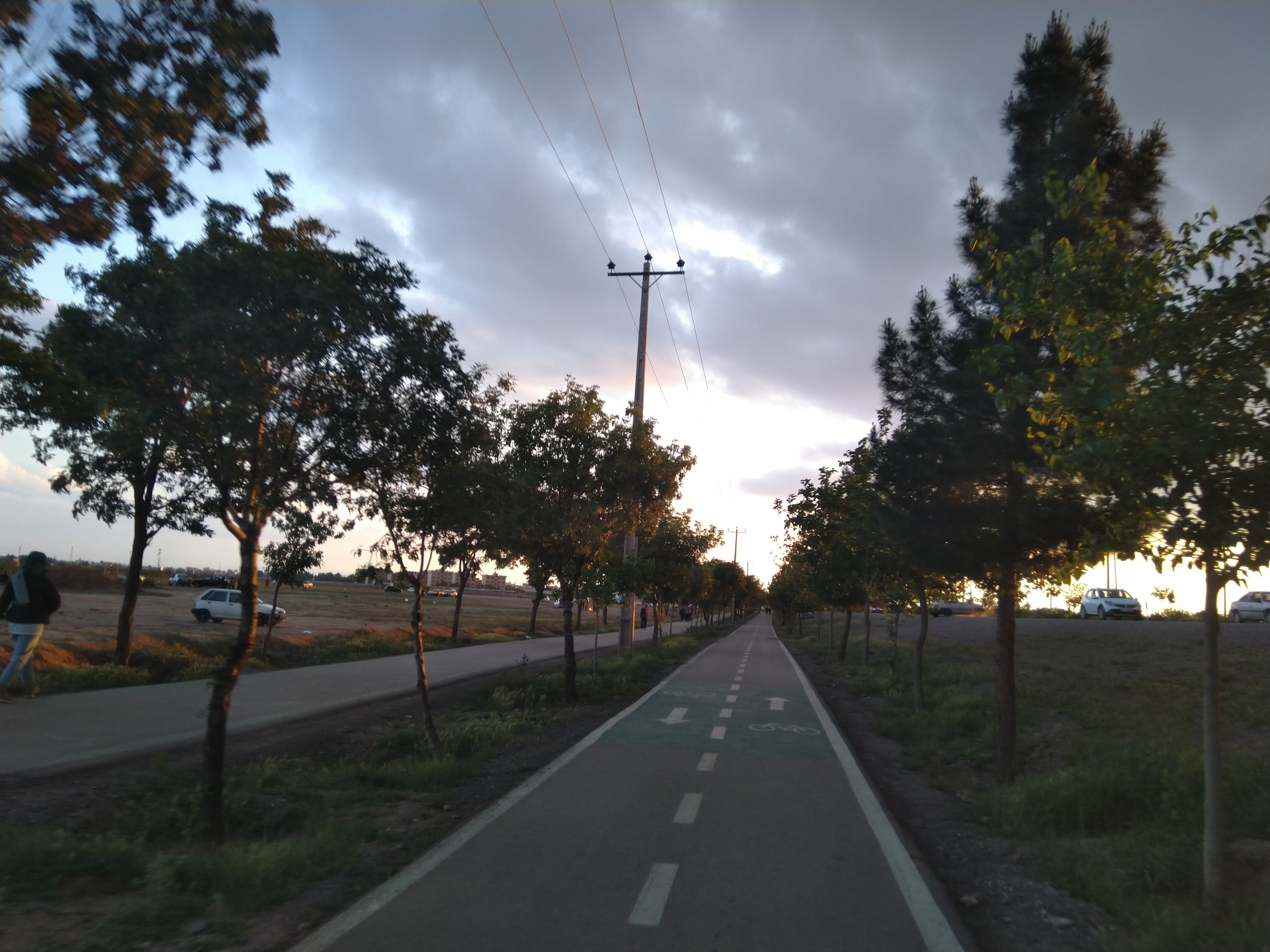
A bicycle lane on the southern foothill of the Binalud Mountain Range (Bagrud Road of Neyshabur, May 2022)

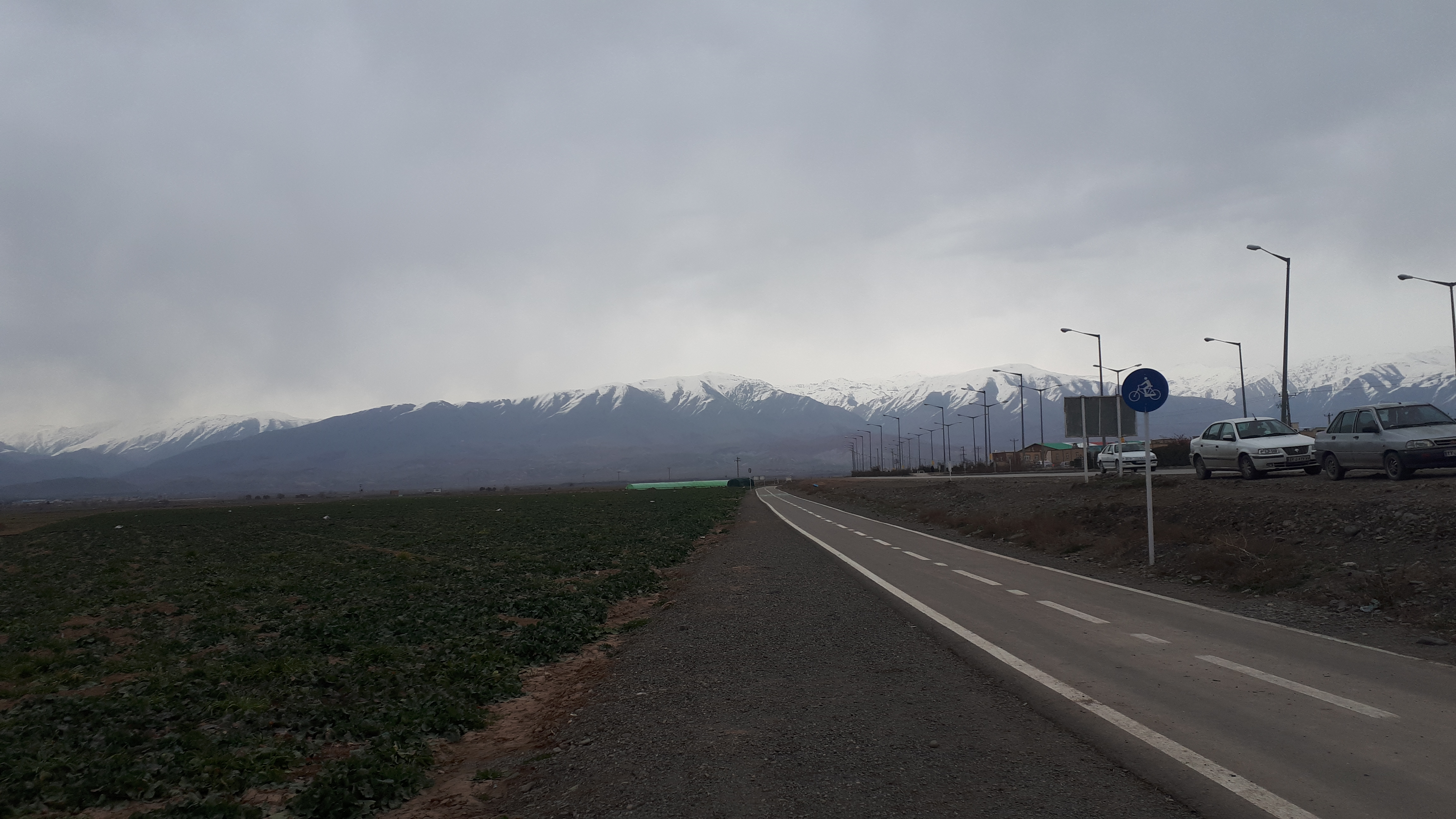
A view of Binalud Mountain Range from near the Hakim Hospital of Neyshabur (February 2019)

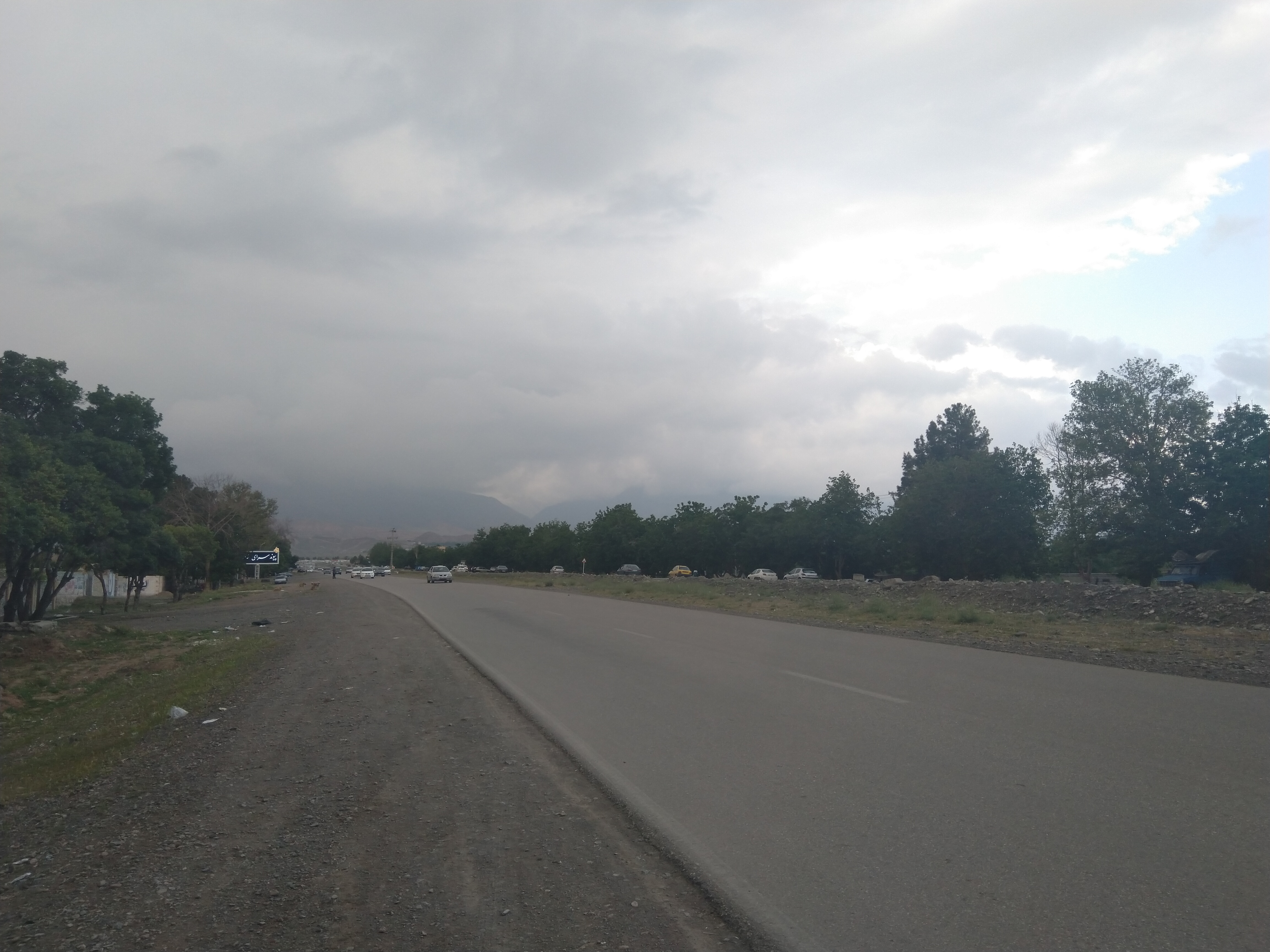
A view of Binalud Mountain Range from Baghrud Road (zone) of Neyshabur, May 2022

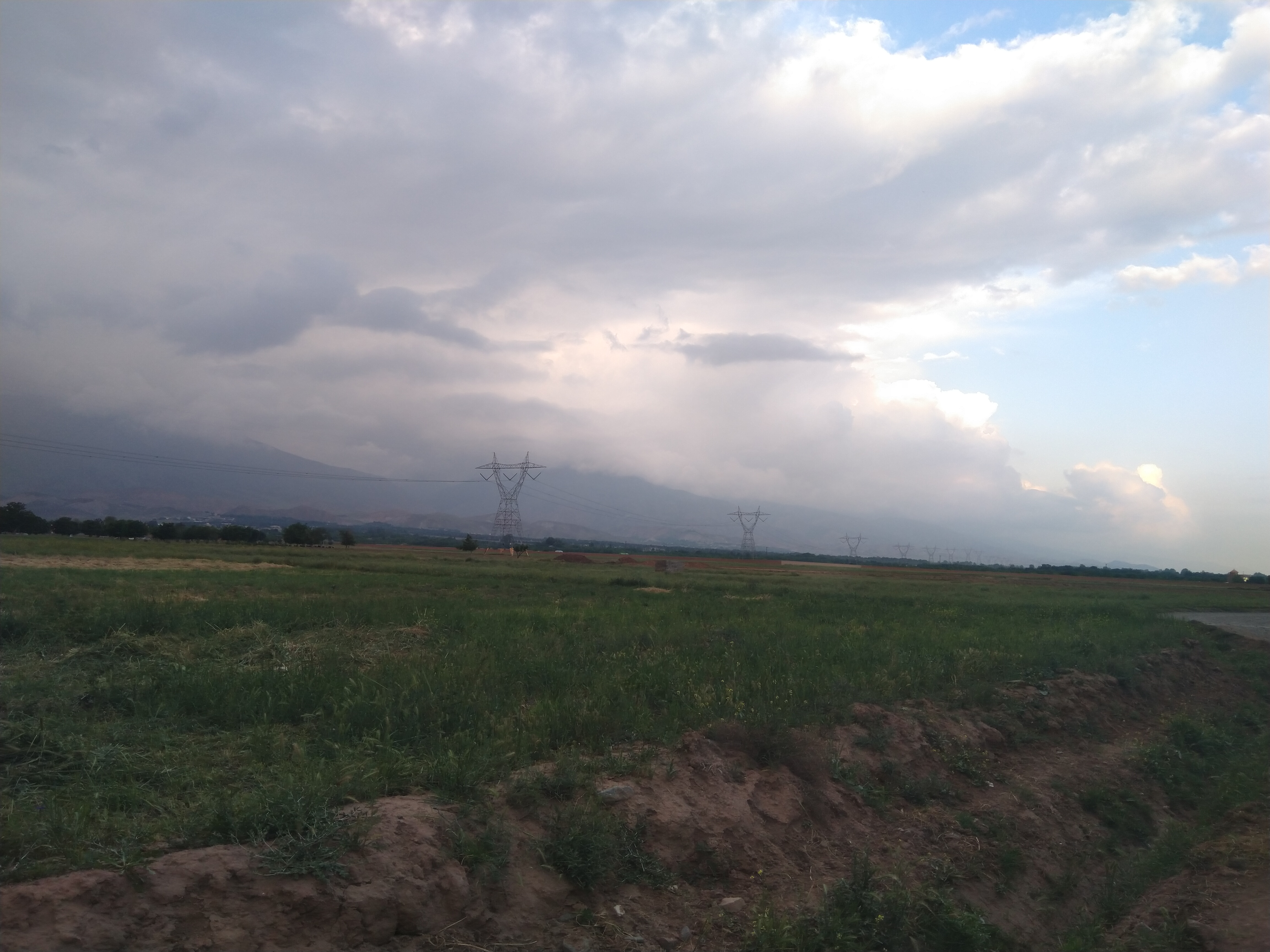
A view of Binalud Mountain Range from Baghrud Road (zone) of Neyshabur, May 2022

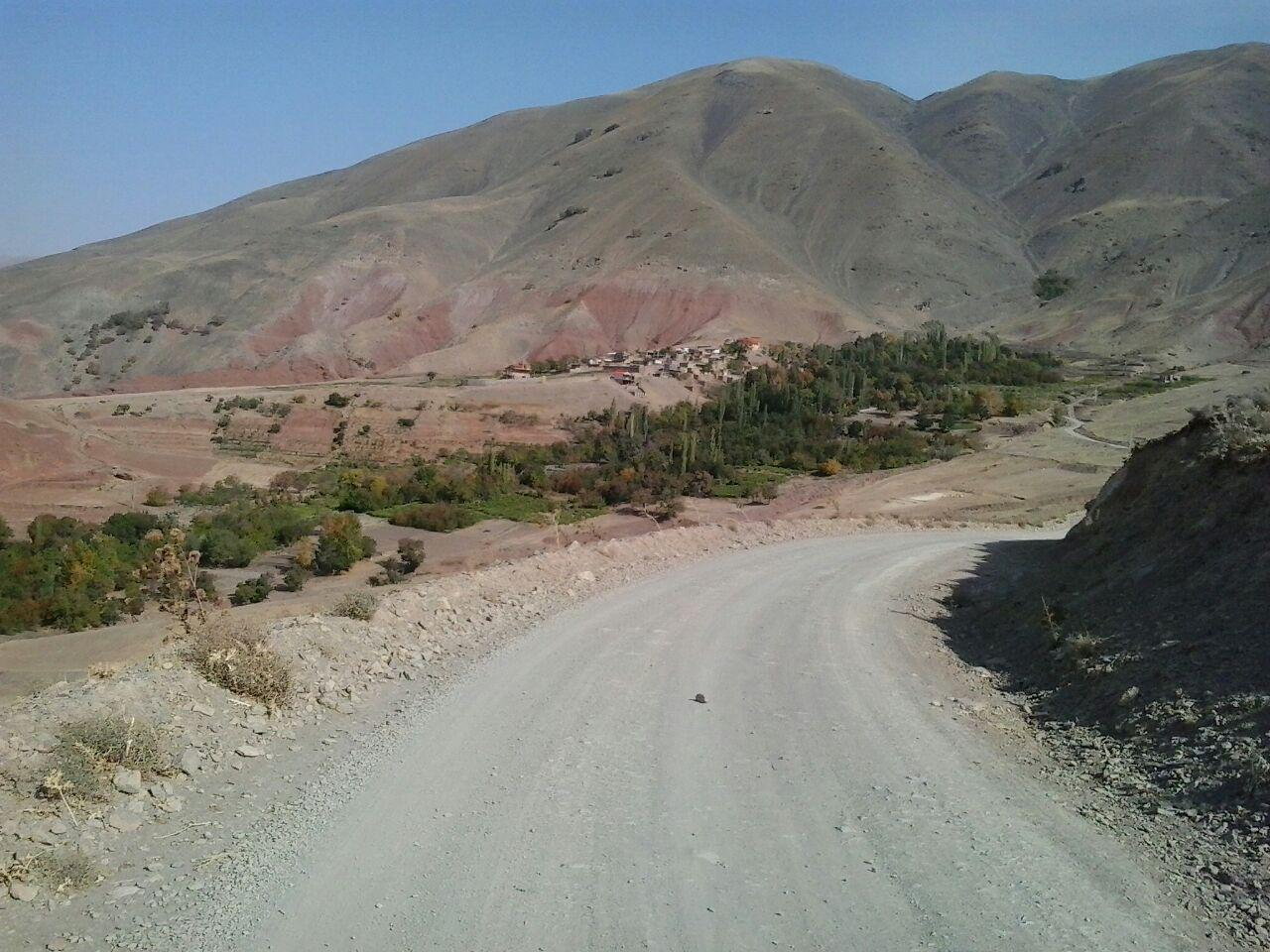
Village of Barf Riz, Neyshabur (summer of 2015). This village is situated on the southern foothill of this mountain range.

=== Panorama ===
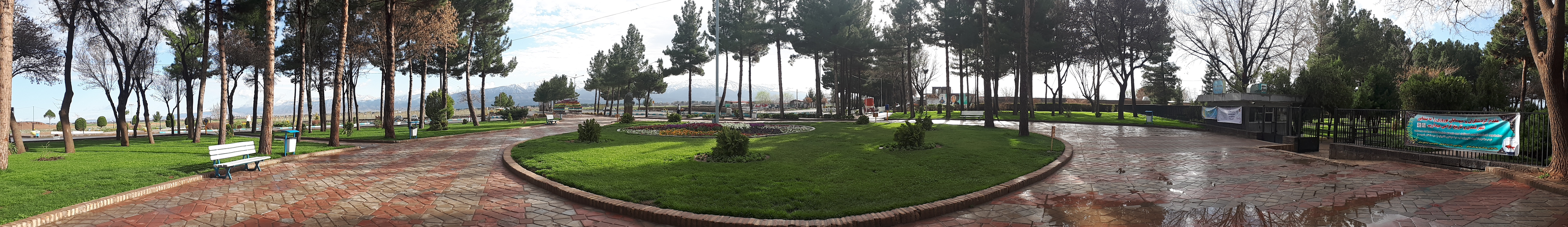
A panorama of the Binalud Mountain Range, south of the city of Nishapur (click to view in full size)
