= Barf Riz =

Barf Riz برف ريز
- village
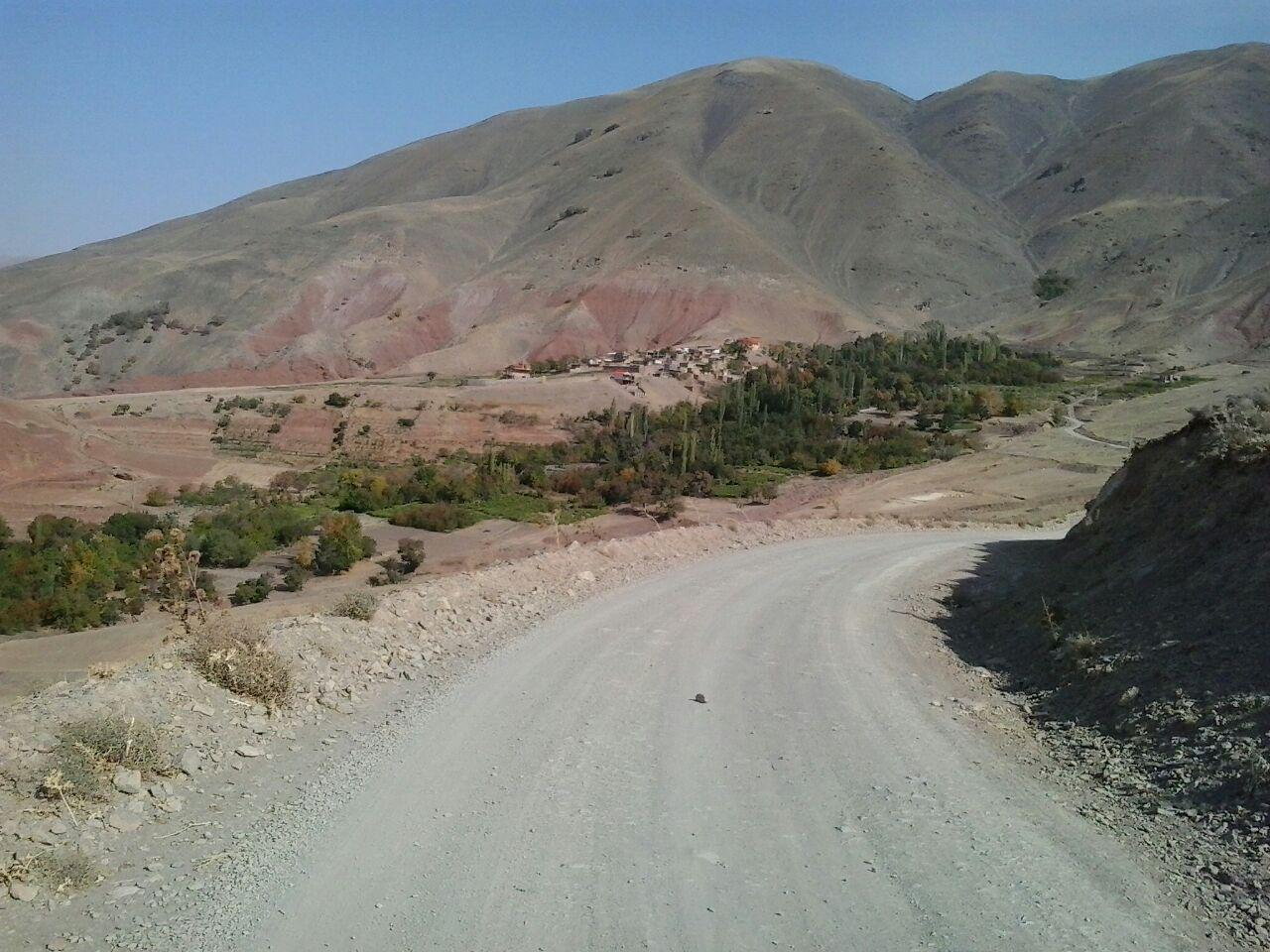
- Village of Barf Riz in the summer of 2015

- Location within Iran
- Coordinates: 36°18′06″N 58°54′01″E
- Country: Iran
- Province: Razavi Khorasan
- County: Nishapur
- Bakhsh: Central
- Rural District: Fazl

Population (2006)
  - Total: 26
- Time zone: UTC+3:30 (IRST)
  - Summer (DST): UTC+4:30 (IRDT)
- Area code: 051

Barf Riz (Persian: برف ريز, also Romanized as Barf Rīz) is a village in Fazl Rural District, in the Central District of Nishapur County, Razavi Khorasan Province, Iran. At the 2006 census, the population was 26, in 13 families.

== See also ==
- List of cities, towns and villages in Razavi Khorasan Province
