= Sarjam Rural District =

Rural district in Razavi Khorasan province, Iran

Sarjam Rural District Persian: دهستان سرجام
- Rural District
- Location within Iran
- Coordinates: 36°01′N 59°32′E
- Country: Iran
- Province: Razavi Khorasan
- County: Mashhad
- District: Ahmadabad
- Established: 1986
- Capital: Malekabad

Population (2016)
  - Total: 10,343
- Time zone: UTC+3:30 (IRST)

Sarjam Rural District (Persian: دهستان سرجام) is in Ahmadabad District of Mashhad County, Razavi Khorasan province, Iran. It is administered from the city of Malekabad.

== Demographics ==
=== Population ===
At the time of the 2006 National Census, the rural district's population was 32,844 in 8,402 households. There were 8,863 inhabitants in 2,657 households at the following census of 2011. The 2016 census measured the population of the rural district as 10,343 in 3,138 households. The most populous of its 51 villages was Deh-e Gheybi, with 1,855 people.

=== Other villages in the rural district ===
- Baghcheh
- Deh Sorkh
- Hasanabad
- Janid Deraz
- Orfi
- Owlang-e Amanabad
- Sar Ghayeh
