= Mount Binalud =

Mountain in Iran

Binalud
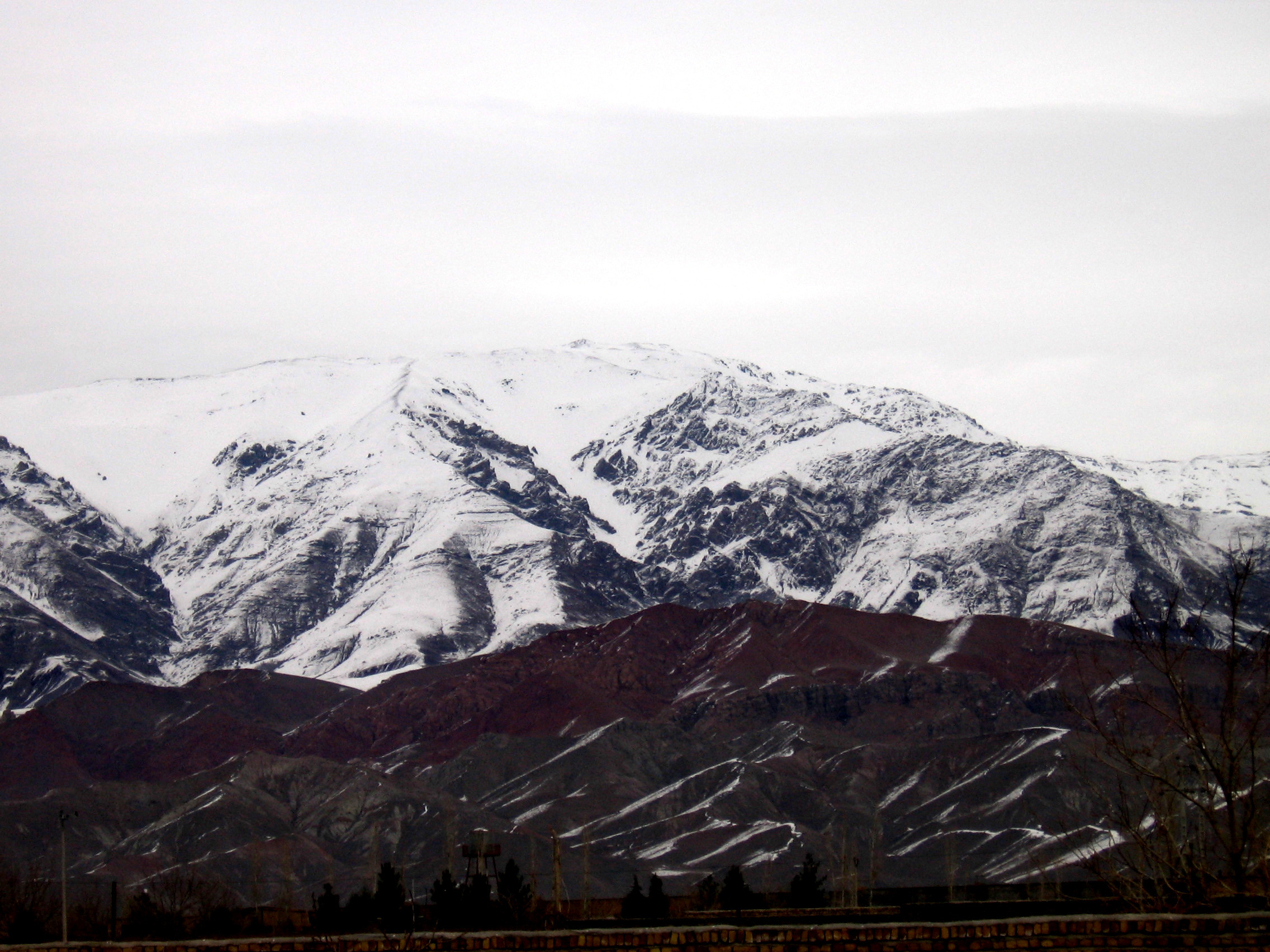
- Mt. Binalud view in winter from Bāghrud Road (south of the mountain).

Highest point
- Elevation: 3,220 m (10,560 ft)
- Listing: Mountains of Iran
- Coordinates: 36°25′35″N 58°50′57″E

Geography
- Location within Iran
- Country: Iran
- Province: Razavi Khorasan
- Cities: Nishapur and Mashhad
- Parent range: Binalud Mountains

Mount Binālud (Persian: بینالود) is a peak in Razavi Khorasan province in Iran. It is also known as the Roof of Khorasan.
