= Piveh Zhan Rural District =

Rural district in Razavi Khorasan province, Iran

Piveh Zhan Rural District Persian: دهستان پيوه ژن
- Rural District
- Location within Iran
- Coordinates: 35°55′N 59°17′E
- Country: Iran
- Province: Razavi Khorasan
- County: Mashhad
- District: Ahmadabad
- Established: 1986
- Capital: Emam Taqi

Population (2016)
  - Total: 20,589
- Time zone: UTC+3:30 (IRST)

Piveh Zhan Rural District (Persian: دهستان پيوه ژن) is in Ahmadabad District of Mashhad County, Razavi Khorasan province, Iran. Its capital is the village of Emam Taqi.

== Demographics ==
=== Population ===
At the time of the 2006 National Census, the rural district's population was 17,262 in 4,720 households. There were 17,768 inhabitants in 5,429 households at the following census of 2011. The 2016 census measured the population of the rural district as 20,589 in 6,433 households. The most populous of its 84 villages was Avareshk, with 4,262 people.

=== Other villages in the rural district ===
- Bazeh Hur
- Dizbad-e Sofla
- Hoseynabad
- Kaj Olang
- Piveh Zhan
- Robat Sefid
- Seydabad
- Soltanabad-e Namak
