= Ahmadabad District (Iran) =

District in Razavi Khorasan province, Iran

Ahmadabad District Persian: بخش احمدآباد
- District
- Location within Iran
- Coordinates: 35°58′N 59°23′E
- Country: Iran
- Province: Razavi Khorasan
- County: Mashhad
- Capital: Malekabad

Population (2016)
  - Total: 32,988
- Time zone: UTC+3:30 (IRST)

Ahmadabad District (Persian: بخش احمدآباد) is in Mashhad County, Razavi Khorasan province, Iran. Its capital is the city of Malekabad.

== Demographics ==
=== Population ===
At the time of the 2006 census, the district's population was 51,267 in 13,424 households. The following census in 2011 counted 28,118 people in 8,492 households. The 2016 census measured the population of the district as 32,988 inhabitants in 10,191 households.

=== Administrative divisions ===
Ahmadabad District Population
Administrative Divisions	2006	2011	2016
Piveh Zhan RD	17,262	17,768	20,589
Sarjam RD	32,844	8,863	10,343
Binalud (city)			
Malekabad (city)	1,161	1,487	2,056
Total	51,267	28,118	32,988
RD = Rural District
