= List of cities, towns and villages in Razavi Khorasan province =

A list of cities, towns and villages in Razavi Khorasan Province of north-eastern Iran:

== Alphabetical ==
Cities are in bold text; all others are villages.

=== A ===
Ab Barg | Ab Barik | Ab Barik-e Bala | Ab Barik-e Olya | Ab Barik-e Sofla | Ab Gorg | Ab Jahan | Ab Kameh | Ab Mal | Ab Mal | Ab Neyeh | Ab Niyeh-ye Sofla | Ab Qaleh | Ab Shuri | Abadi Zavarzmand Shomareh Mowtowr 52 | Abadi Zavarzmand Shomareh Mowtowr 55 | Abardeh-ye Olya | Abardeh-ye Sofla | Abaresh | Abbas Qaleh | Abbasabad | Abbasabad | Abbasabad | Abbasabad | Abbasabad | Abbasabad | Abbasabad | Abbasabad | Abbasabad-e Arab | Abbasabad-e Faramishan | Abbasabad-e Jadid | Abbasabad-e Kheyrabad | Abbasabad-e Malek | Abbasabad-e Qandi | Abd ol Majid | Abd ol Maleki | Abdabad | Abdalabad | Abdaru | Abderaz | Abdolabad | Abdolabad | Abdolabad | Abdolabad | Abdolabad | Abdollah Givi | Abdollahabad | Abdollahabad | Abdollahabad | Abeshki | Abgahi | Abgarm | Abgineh | Abirabad | Abjeqan | Abkhizeh | Abkuh | Abkuh Aliabad | Abnow | Abqad | Abqad | Abqah | Abquy | Abrash | Abravan | Abrud | Abrud | Absabad | Abu Chenari | Abu ol Khazen | Abu Sadi | Abu Torab | Abuyesan | Adelabad | Adg | Afchang | Afkan | Aghel Kamar | Aghuyeh | Aghzaghaneh | Ahang | Ahangar | Ahangaran | Ahangaran | Ahianu | Ahmadabad | Ahmadabad | Ahmadabad | Ahmadabad | Ahmadabad | Ahmadabad | Ahmadabad | Ahmadabad | Ahmadabad | Ahmadabad | Ahmadabad | Ahmadabad | Ahmadabad | Ahmadabad | Ahmadabad | Ahmadabad-e Banakdar | Ahmadabad-e Khazai | Ahmadabad-e Malek | Ahmadabad-e Moqbel | Ahmadabad-e Sheykh | Ahmadabad-e Sowlat | Ahmadiyeh | Ahovan | Ahubam | Akbarabad | Akbarabad | Akbarabad | Akbarabad | Akbarabad | Akbarabad | Akbarabad-e Now Deh | Akhangan | Akhlamad-e Sofla | Akhlamad-e-Olya | Akhtar Shah | Al | Alamdar | Alang-e Olya | Alang-e Sofla | Alaqeh | Alaqeh Janban | Albolagh | Aleyak | Alghur | Ali Abadak | Ali Beyk | Ali Mansuri | Ali Palang | Ali | Aliabad | Aliabad | Aliabad | Aliabad | Aliabad | Aliabad | Aliabad | Aliabad | Aliabad | Aliabad | Aliabad | Aliabad | Aliabad | Aliabad | Aliabad | Aliabad | Aliabad-e Alanchag | Aliabad-e Bahman Jan | Aliabad-e Bala | Aliabad-e Daman | Aliabad-e Jadid | Aliabad-e Kalkhuni | Aliabad-e Olya | Aliabad-e Seyyed Rahim | Aliabad-e Shahid | Aliabad-e Shur | Aliabad-e Shur | Aliabad-e Sofla | Aliabad-e Takeh | Aliabad-e Tarkan | Aliabad-e Vasat | Alinaqi-ye Olya | Alinaqi-ye Sofla | Aliyak | Allahabad | Allahabad | Allahabad | Allahi | Allahian | Allahjegerd | Allatman | Alm Juq | Almajeq | Almejuq-e Sofla | Altatu | Aman Magan | Amanabad | Amarghan-e Sofla | Amerghan-e Tus | Amghan | Amidi-ye Kohneh | Aminabad | Aminabad | Aminabad | Amirabad | Amirabad | Amirabad | Amirabad | Amirabad | Amirabad | Amirabad | Amirabad | Amirabad | Amrudak | Anabad | Anavi | Anbar Sara | Anbarestan | Anbarkeh | Andad | Andadeh | Andanjerd | Andar Ab | Andarzi | Anday | Andorokh | Anjeshesh | Anjidan | Annabestan | Aq Cheshmeh | Aq Dash | Aq Kamar-e Olya | Aq Kamar-e Sofla | Aq Kariz | Aq Mahdi | Aq Qayah | Aqa Bil-e Olya | Aqa Bil-e Sofla | Aqanj | Aqar-e Olya | Aqar-e Sofla | Aqdarband Coal Mine | Aqdash | Arababad | Arbab | Archang | Archangan | Ardak | Ardalan | Ardameh | Ardameh | Ardanj | Ardesman | Ardiz | Ardugah Shahid Matehri | Arefabad | Arezumandeh | Arg-e Now Juy | Arg-e Qalandar | Argha | Arghesh | Argi | Arkhud | Arreh | Arreh Kamar | Artian | Aruk | Arvand | Aryan | Aryeh | Arzancheh-ye Sofla | Arzaneh | Arzaneh | Asadabad | Asadabad | Asadabad | Asadabad-e Darband | Asadiyeh | Asadkhan | Asefabad | Asfiukh | Asgarabad | Asgarabad | Asgariyeh | Asgerd | Asheqan | Ashk-e Zari | Asi Bolagh | Askariyeh | Astayesh | Asu Jadid | Asyab Qashqa | Atarchi | Attaiyeh | Avandar | Avareshk | Avaz Mohammad Beyk | Avaz | Avazi | Avian | Azad Deh | Azad Manjir | Azadvar | Azghad | Azghand | Azimabad | Azizabad | Azizabad | Azizabad | Aziziyeh

=== B ===
Ba Sharik | Bab al Hakam | Baba Langar | Baba Qarah | Baba Ramazan | Babafaraji | Bad Ashian | Bad Khvor | Bagh Abbas | Bagh Baghu | Bagh Jahan | Bagh Kand | Bagh Kheyrat | Bagh Meyan | Bagh Sangan-e Olya | Bagh Sangan-e Sofla | Baghak | Baghak-e Sofla | Baghan | Baghat-e Dastgerdan | Baghcheh | Baghcheh | Bagh-e Asiya | Bagh-e Bakhshi | Bagh-e Farajerd | Bagh-e Jafarabad | Bagh-e Keshmir-e Olya | Bagh-e Now | Bagh-e Salar | Baghesht | Baghgah | Baghjar | Baghshan | Baghshan-e Gach | Baghunabad | Bagijan | Bahar | Bahariyeh | Bahman Jan-e Olya | Bahman Jan-e Sofla | Bahman | Bahmanabad | Bahramiyeh | Bahreh | Bahrud | Bahrudi | Bajestan | Bajgiran | Bakavol | Bakharz | Bakhtabad | Bakhtabad-e Bala | Bakhtiar | Balaju | Balendar | Baluch Khaneh | Bamchenar | Ban Qan | Band-e Ozbak | Band-e Qara | Bandeh | Bandivan | Bani Tak | Baqerabad | Baqeriyeh | Baqi | Baqi | Baqmach | Bar Rud | Bar | Barabad | Barabad | Barag Shahi | Barakuh | Barakuh | Baratabad | Barazq | Bardar | Bardaskan | Bardaskan Industrial Park | Bardeh | Bareh Khur | Barf Riz | Barg | Barghamad | Bargow | Barkad Jadid | Barqi | Barsil | Baru | Barud | Barzanun | Bas Saruq | Basfar | Bashirabad | Bashnij | Bashtin | Batu | Bayat | Bayg | Baz Howz-e Olya | Baz Howz-e Sofla | Baz Qand | Bazangan | Baz-e Heydar | Bazeh | Bazeh Hur | Bazeh Kalagh | Bazeh-ye Asheqan | Bazguy | Bazuband | Behabad | Behabad | Behdadin | Bekavol | Belashabad | Benesbard-e Sofla | Beng | Benhang | Beniabid | Berdu | Bereyli | Berzu | Besh Aghaj | Besh Darreh | Besharat | Beshkan | Besk | Besk | Besk | Beyg Nazar | Beyhud | Beynaq | Beyram Shah | Beyramabad | Beyramabad | Beyrut | Beyzakh | Bezanjerd | Bezanjerd-e Eslami | Bezanjerd-e Kordian | Bezd | Bezq | Biasabad-e Now Sazi | Biavand | Bid Khan | Bid Khvor | Bid Parsi | Bid Sukhteh | Bid | Bidak | Bidak | Bidak | Bidak | Bidestan | Bidestan | Bidokht | Bidvey | Biglar | Bijerk | Bijvard | Biku | Biland | Bimorgh | Bisqafizan | Bizeh | Bodaghabad | Bohangar | Bohlulabad | Bojdan | Bojdan | Bojnu-ye Olya | Boland Pey | Bolghur | Bolqanabad | Bolqosheh | Bon Jakh | Boneyabad | Boqchir | Boqsani | Boqsani | Borj | Borjabad | Borjak | Borjak-e Naqdali | Borjak-e Sheykhi | Borj-e Qaleh | Borj-e Qardash | Borj-e Zeydanlu | Borjmuri | Borjuk | Bormahan | Bornabad | Borqeban | Bors | Borselan | Borughan | Borzeshabad | Borzu | Borzu | Boshnu | Boshrabad | Boshruy | Bozjani | Bozmargan | Bozquchan | Bozveshk | Bunesh | Buriabad | Buteh Gaz | Buteh Gaz | Buteh Mordeh | Buzh Mehran | Buzhabad | Buzhan

=== C ===
Chah Ab | Chah Boland | Chah Chul | Chah Darreh | Chah Khaseh | Chah Matar | Chah Mazar-e Olya | Chah Mazar-e Sofla | Chah Mejeng | Chah Molla | Chah Nasar | Chah Shur | Chah Sukhteh | Chahak | Chahak | Chahar Bagh | Chahar Bast Bagh | Chahar Bid | Chahar Borj | Chahar Borji | Chahar Cheshmeh-ye Olya | Chahar Deh | Chahar Derakht | Chahar Gushli | Chahar Mahan | Chahar Rah | Chahar Suq | Chahar Takab | Chahar Takht-e Kuk | Chahar Taq | Chaharta Gav | Chahchah | Chahchaheh | Chah-e Abd ol Maleki | Chah-e Amiq Bazmi Shomareh-ye Do | Chah-e Amiq Hoseyn Jafatai Shamareh-ye Yek | Chah-e Amiq Hoseyni | Chah-e Amiq Khaneh Nowruz | Chah-e Amiq Sanat Khani | Chah-e Amiq Shomareh-ye 6 Kal Daghlan | Chah-e Amiq Shomareh-ye Chahar Kal Daghlaq Musa Joghatai | Chah-e Amiq Taheri | Chah-e Aruj Ali Joghatayi | Chah-e Dasht Mohammad Khan 1 | Chah-e Dasht Mohammad Khan 13 | Chah-e Dasht Mohammad Khan 15 | Chah-e Dasht Mohammad Khan 3 | Chah-e Dasht Mohammad Khan 6 | Chah-e Dasht Mohammad Khan 7 | Chah-e Dasht Mohammad Khan 9 | Chah-e Masha Shomareh Do Markuhak Abdi | Chah-e Masha Shomareh Yek Markuhak Safari | Chah-e Naimabad-e Yeha | Chah-e Sadiq Salar Ali Akbar | Chah-e Salar | Chah-e Shend | Chah-e Shomareh 5 Markuhak | Chah-e Shomareh-ye Do Zur | Chah-e Shomareh-ye Yek Hazarat Qoli | Chah-e Shur | Chah-e Soltan | Chah-e Talkh | Chah-e Vahab-e Pain | Chah-e Yabu | Chah-e Zul | Chaheshk | Chahuk | Chakab | Chakaneh-ye Olya | Chakhmaq | Chakudar | Chalaki | Chaleh Zard | Chalpu | Cham Gard | Chamanabad | Chamleh | Chanbar Gharbal | Chanbaran | Chang Kalagh | Changabad-e Jadid | Chapeshlu | Chaq Qarah | Chaqar | Chaqeh-ye Baluchha | Charam-e Kohneh | Charam-e Now | Charmi | Chehel Ghani | Chehel Hojreh | Chehel Morghian | Chehel Sar | Chekkeh Ab | Chekneh | Chelmen Sang-e Olya | Chelmen Sang-e Sofla | Chelqi | Chenar Bow | Chenar Sukhteh | Chenar Sukhteh | Chenar | Chenar | Chenar | Chenar | Chenar | Chenar | Chenar | Chenarak | Chenaran | Chenaran | Cheragh Chin | Cheram | Cheran | Cheru | Chesham | Cheshmeh Ali | Cheshmeh Anjir | Cheshmeh Avash | Cheshmeh Ayyub | Cheshmeh Gilas | Cheshmeh Gol | Cheshmeh Golek-e Olya | Cheshmeh Golek-e Sofla | Cheshmeh Gondeh | Cheshmeh Hadi | Cheshmeh Jalal | Cheshmeh Jowhar | Cheshmeh Khosrow | Cheshmeh Madan Siyah | Cheshmeh Mahi | Cheshmeh Mazar | Cheshmeh Munes | Cheshmeh Ney | Cheshmeh Puneh | Cheshmeh Shur | Cheshmeh Sir | Cheshmeh Teymuri | Cheshmeh Zard | Cheshmeh | Cheshmeh-e Alimva | Cheshmeh-ye Abdal Karim | Cheshmeh-ye Ali | Cheshmeh-ye Azad | Cheshmeh-ye Gol | Cheshmeh-ye Hajji Soleyman | Chezg | Chitgar | Chubin | Chulanak-e Sofla | Chuynli

=== D ===
Dadanlu | Dafi | Daghdar | Daghi | Daghi | Daghian | Dahan Qaleh | Dahaneh-ye Akhlamad | Dahaneh-ye Chahal | Dahaneh-ye Heydari | Dahaneh-ye Shur | Dalameh-ye Olya | Dalaneh | Dalbar Malek Baqar | Dam Rud | Damanjan | Damask | Damdari Dasht Livestock Center | Dandaneh | Daneh Kashefiyeh | Daq-e Bohlul | Dar Biaban | Dar os Salam | Dar Riz-e Olya | Dar Sufeh | Darab | Darabad-e Shahzadeh | Darangun | Darband | Darband-e Golriz | Darband-e Olya | Darband-e Olya | Darband-e Sofla | Darband-e Sofla | Darband-e Vosta | Darbandi | Darbehesht | Darbehesht | Darchaq | Dardavey | Dareyn | Dargahabad | Dargaz | Darqadam | Darrud | Dars Akhund | Darudbakht | Daryacheh | Darzab | Das | Dash Khaneh | Dash Khaneh | Dashkhaneh | Dashkhani | Dasht | Dasht | Dashtab | Dast Feshad | Dastgerd | Dastgerdan | Dastjerd | Dastjerd | Dastjerd-e Aqa Bozorg | Dasturan | Davariyeh | Davarzan | Davodli | Deh Bagh | Deh Bar | Deh Kushkak | Deh Menar | Deh Molla | Deh Mozaffar | Deh Now | Deh Now | Deh Now | Deh Now | Deh Now | Deh Now | Deh Now | Deh Now | Deh Now | Deh Now-e Kherabeh | Deh Now-e Lakzi | Deh Now-e Shur | Deh Now-ye Hashemabad | Deh Now-ye Kenar Gusheh | Deh Now-ye Khaleseh | Deh Rud | Deh Sang | Deh Sheykh | Deh Sorkh | Deh Sorkh | Deh-e Borzu | Deh-e Darugheh | Deh-e Gheybi | Deh-e Habbeh | Deh-e Hallaj | Deh-e Hoseyni | Deh-e Khatib Jadid | Deh-e Mian | Deh-e Now | Deh-e Now | Deh-e Pain | Deheshk | Dehesht-e Olya | Dehnow | Dehnow | Delbar | Delbaran | Delkabad | Delqand | Derakht-e Bid | Derakht-e Bid | Derakht-e Bid | Derakht-e Bid-e Olya | Derakht-e Bid-e Sofla | Derakht-e Jowz | Derakht-e Sefidar | Derakht-e Senjed | Derakht-e Senjed | Derakht-e Senjed | Derakht-e Tut | Derangabad | Deraz Ab | Deraz Ab-e Olya | Deraz Ab-e Sofla | Devin | Dezq | Dezq | Disfan | Dishdish | Divandar | Divaneh Khvoy | Divangah | Dizadiz | Dizavand | Dizbad-e Olya | Dizbad-e Sofla | Do Abi-ye Olya | Do Abi-ye Sofla | Do Chahi | Do Chahi | Do Chahi-ye Bala | Do Qaleh-ye Berashk | Do Sang | Dom-e Rubah | Dor Badam | Dorofk-e Olya | Dorofk-e Sofla | Doruk | Doruneh | Dowlat Shanlu | Dowlatabad | Dowlatabad | Dowlatabad | Dowlatabad | Dowlatabad | Dowlatabad | Dowlatabad | Dowlatabad | Dowlatabad | Dowlatabad | Dowlatkhaneh | Dowlui | Dowqarun | Dudanlu | Dughabad | Dughayi | Dugheshk | Duleh | Dulkhan | Dulu | Dunshah | Duruk-e Pain | Dust Mohammad Beyk | Dustabad | Dustabad | Dustabad

=== E ===
Ebrahim Bay | Ebrahimabad Abu Talab | Ebrahimabad | Ebrahimabad | Ebrahimabad | Ebrahimabad | Ebrahimabad | Ebrahimabad | Ebrahimabad | Ebrahimabad | Ebrahimabad | Ebrahimabad | Ebrahimabad | Ebrahimabad | Ebrahimabad | Ebrahimabad-e Bala Joveyn | Ebrahimabad-e Muri | Ebrahimi | Elyatu | Emadiyeh-ye Sofla | Emam Qaleh-ye Olya | Emam Taqi | Emamiyeh | Emamqoli | Emamzadeh Ebrahim | Emamzadeh-ye Hoseyn Asghar | Emarat | Eqbali | Eqbaliyeh | Ertinj | Esfandian | Esfiz | Eshaqabad | Eshaqabad | Eshqabad | Eshqabad | Eshqabad | Eshqabad | Eshqabad | Eshqabad-e Kohneh | Eshratabad | Eshratabad | Eshratabad | Eshratabad | Eshratabad | Eshtivan | Esjil | Eskandarabad | Eslam Qaleh | Eslam Qaleh | Eslamabad | Eslamabad | Eslamabad | Eslamabad | Eslamabad | Eslamabad | Eslamabad | Eslamabad-e Arab | Eslamabad-e Chahar Gavareh | Eslamabad-e Khalaj | Eslamabad-e Lakazi | Eslamiyeh | Eslamiyeh | Esmail Khan | Esmailabad | Esmailabad | Esmailabad | Esmailabad | Esmailabad | Esmailabad | Esmailabad-e Gorji | Esmatabad | Estaj | Estaj | Estajrud | Estakhr | Estir | Eynabad | Eyshabad | Eyshabad | Eyshabad-e Nizeh | Ezzatabad | Ezzat-e Pain

=== F ===
Fadafen | Fadak | Fadihah | Fadisheh | Fahandar | Fahneh | Fahneh | Fakh | Fakhrabad | Fakhrabad | Fakhrabad | Fakhrabad | Fakhrabad | Fakhr-e Davud | Fakhriyeh | Falizak | Fallahabad | Fang | Farahabad | Farahabad | Farahabad | Farashian | Fardaq | Farg | Farhadgerd | Fariabad | Fariman | Farimaneh | Farizi | Farkhad | Farkhak | Farkhan-e Kohneh | Farkhan-e Olya | Farkhan-e Shahrah | Farkhan-e Sofla | Farkhar | Farmanabad | Farrokhabad | Farrokhabad | Farsheh | Farsiyeh | Fasanqar | Fathabad | Fathabad | Fathabad | Fathabad | Fathabad | Fathabad | Fathabad | Fathabad | Fathabad-e Gorgha | Fathabad-e Now | Fathabad-e Yazdiha | Fayandar | Faz | Fazel Mand | Fazelabad | Fazl | Fazlabad | Fazlabad | Federd | Ferdows | Ferezneh | Ferezni | Ferezq | Ferizi | Feshanjerd | Feyzabad | Feyzabad | Feyzabad | Feyzabad | Feyzabad | Feyzabad | Feyzabad | Feyzabad | Feyzabad | Feyzabad | Feyzabad | Feyzabad | Feyzabad-e Lalaha | Feyzabad-e Mish Mast | Fiani | Filab | Filian-e Qaem Maqam | Filian-e Sofla | Filkhaneh | Filshur | Firuz Kuh | Firuzabad | Firuzabad | Firuzabad | Firuzabad | Firuzeh | Firuzeh | Firuzi | Forutqeh | Foshtanq | Fowji | Frontier Battalion | Fudenjan | Fushenjan

=== G ===
Gach | Gaduganlu | Gaft | Gaft | Gah | Gajvan | Galk | Gamizdar | Gandab | Gandabar | Gandah Khalu | Gandeh Cheshmeh | Gandom Khvab | Gandom Shad | Ganju | Gapi | Garab | Garab | Garab | Gardalud | Gardan | Garineh | Garmab | Garmab | Garmab-e Shahzadeh | Garmak | Garmeh | Garmeh | Garu | Garu | Garyab | Gash | Gav Borj | Gav Cheshmeh | Gavareshkan | Gaveh-ye Kalateh | Gaveh-ye Khalseh | Gavkosh | Gavterna | Gazargan | Gazi | Gechalik | Geda Mohammad | Gerazg | Geshn | Gevanduk | Gevey | Geysvarnusazi | Gezicheh | Gezik | Ghaffarabad | Ghaniabad | Ghar | Gharq Ab Zar | Ghazanfari | Ghezel Aghul | Ghonchi | Giami | Gol Ezqand | Gol Gonbad | Gol Khandan | Gol Khandan | Gol Khatun | Gol Mey-e Bala | Gol Mey-e Pain | Gol Mim | Gol Mokharan | Gol Qandasht | Gol Sheykh | Golarcheh-ye Olya | Golarcheh-ye Sofla | Golbin | Golboqra | Golbui-ye Bala | Golbui-ye Pain | Golestan | Golestan | Golestan | Golmakan | Golom | Golriz | Golsara | Golshan | Golshan | Golshanabad | Golshanabad | Golshanabad | Golshanabad | Golzar | Gonabad | Gonabad Industrial Park | Gonabad | Gonbad Heq | Gonbad Zia | Gonbadli | Gonbadvaz | Gonbatuk | Gorakhk | Gorazi | Gorazi | Gorji-ye Olya | Gorji-ye Sofla | Gormasi | Goruh | Govareshk | Govareshki | Gowd Chah | Gowd-e Asia | Gowjeh | Gowji | Gownjuk-e Olya | Gownjuk-e Sofla | Gozalabad | Gozar | Guganlu | Gujgi-ye Bala | Gur Band | Guri | Guri | Gurkhar | Gush Laghar | Gush

=== H ===
Hafizabad | Hafizabad | Haft Sui | Haftkhaneh | Haji Kahu | Hajj Esmaeil | Hajj Kazemi | Hajj Rajab | Hajji Beygi | Hajji Madad | Hajji Yar | Hajjiabad | Hajjiabad | Hajjiabad | Hajjiabad | Hajjiabad | Hajjiabad | Hajjiabad | Hajjiabad | Hajjiabad | Hajjiabad | Hajjiabad | Hajjiabad | Hajjiabad | Hajjiabad | Hajjiabad | Hajjiabad | Hajjiabad | Hajjiabad | Hajjiabad-e Bazzazi | Hajjiabad-e Hajji Safar | Hajjian | Hakimabad | Hakimabad | Hakimabad | Hakimabad | Halakabad | Halali | Halvai | Hamidabad | Hammam Qaleh | Hamzar | Hamzeh Kanlu | Hantabad | Haqnabad | Haqqiyeh | Haqverdi | Har Kareh | Harashi | Haravanj | Haresabad | Harimabad | Hasan Aqeh | Hasan Bolbol | Hasan Khordu | Hasan Shahab | Hasanabad | Hasanabad | Hasanabad | Hasanabad | Hasanabad | Hasanabad | Hasanabad | Hasanabad | Hasanabad | Hasanabad | Hasanabad | Hasanabad | Hasanabad | Hasanabad | Hasanabad | Hasanabad | Hasanabad | Hasanabad | Hasanabad-e Amelzadeh | Hasanabad-e Belher | Hasanabad-e Emam Jomeh | Hasanabad-e Gorji | Hasanabad-e Layen-e Now | Hasanabad-e Manqashali | Hasanabad-e Sabrow | Hasanabad-e Salar | Hasanabad-e Sar Tappeh | Hasanabad-e Sufi | Hasanak | Hasana-ye Hajjiabad-e Hajji Ebrahim | Hasan-e Aliabad | Hashemabad | Hashemabad | Hashemabad | Hashemabad-e Soltani | Hatam Qaleh | Hatiteh | Hatiteh | Havas | Hazrat-e Soltan | Hedayatabad | Helal | Helali | Hemmatabad | Hemmatabad | Hemmatabad | Hemmatabad | Hemmatabad | Hemmatabad | Hemmatabad | Hemmatabad-e Chalaki | Hemmatabad-e Zamani | Hendelabad | Hesar Jalal | Hesar Juq | Hesar Now | Hesar Now | Hesar Sorkh | Hesar | Hesar | Hesar | Hesar | Hesar | Hesar | Hesar | Hesar | Hesar | Hesar | Hesar-e Hajji Esmail | Hesar-e Khuni | Hesar-e Kushk | Hesar-e Sorkh | Hesar-e Sorkh | Hesar-e Yazdan | Heshmatabad | Heshmatabad | Heshmatiyeh | Hey Hey | Heydarabad | Heydarabad | Heydarabad | Hezarkhusheh | Hiteh Tala | Hodk | Hofman Brickworks | Hojjatabad | Hojjatabad | Hojjatabad | Hokmabad | Homai | Homai-ye Olya | Homeyreh | Honarstan-e Kashavarzi | Hoseyn Aqa Beyk | Hoseyn Naju | Hoseynabad | Hoseynabad | Hoseynabad | Hoseynabad | Hoseynabad | Hoseynabad | Hoseynabad | Hoseynabad | Hoseynabad | Hoseynabad | Hoseynabad | Hoseynabad | Hoseynabad | Hoseynabad | Hoseynabad | Hoseynabad | Hoseynabad | Hoseynabad-e Arab | Hoseynabad-e Chaghuki | Hoseynabad-e Ganji | Hoseynabad-e Gazband | Hoseynabad-e Gusheh | Hoseynabad-e Jadid | Hoseynabad-e Jangal | Hoseynabad-e Kalali | Hoseynabad-e Kamal al Malek | Hoseynabad-e Mahlar-e Sofla | Hoseynabad-e Makhtari | Hoseynabad-e Mirza Momen | Hoseynabad-e Mohlar-e Olya | Hoseynabad-e Nazer | Hoseynabad-e Qaleh Sorkh | Hoseynabad-e Qorqi | Hoseynabad-e Rashtkhvar | Hoseynabad-e Rekhneh Gol | Hoseynabad-e Sedaqat | Hoseynabad-e Taqi | Hoseyni | Hoseyni | Howz-e Karam | Howz-e Sorkh | Howz-e Sorkh

=== I ===
Idah Lik | Idu | Iileh | Il Hesar | Ilanjiq | Inchegan | Incheh Keykanlu | Incheh Sabolagh | Incheh Shahbaz | Irajabad | Istgah Kheyam | Istgah-e Attar | Istgah-e Azadvar | Istgah-e Fariman | Istgah-e Neqab | Istgah-e Rah Ahn Sabzevar | Istgah-e Sankhvast | Ivar | Izi

=== J ===
Jabaleh | Jabbar Beyg | Jabbar | Jabuz | Jafarabad | Jafarabad | Jafarabad | Jafarabad | Jafarabad | Jafarabad | Jafarabad | Jafarabad | Jafarabad-e Olya | Jafarabad-e Olya | Jafariyeh | Jagharq | Jaghneh Hazrati | Jahanabad | Jahanabad | Jahanabad | Jahanabad | Jahanabad-e Maleki | Jahangir-e Olya | Jahiz Khaneh | Jalalabad | Jalalabad | Jalalabad | Jalali | Jalalieh | Jalambadan | Jalandeh | Jalilabad | Jalilabad | Jam Ab | Jam-Abad | Jamal Deh | Jamalabad | Jambarjuq | Janan | Jandab | Jangah | Jangal | Janid Deraz | Jannatabad | Jannatabad | Jannatabad | Jannatabad-e Jangal | Jar Khoshk-e Olya | Jar Khoshk-e Sofla | Jarahi | Jarrahi | Jartudeh | Jashnabad | Javadieh | Javadiyeh | Javadiyeh | Javar Tan | Jazandar | Jazandar | Jazin | Jeghal | Jemran | Jigh Jigh | Jijabad | Jilu | Jimabad | Jizabad | Jizabad-e Shahan Garmab | Joghatai | Joghri | Jolfan | Jolleyn | Jomhuri | Jonbaz | Joneydabad | Jong | Jordavi | Jow-e Pain | Jowzan | Jowzeqan | Jufurush | Jukal | Juqan | Juri

=== K ===
Kabir | Kaboli | Kabudan | Kabutrakuh | Kachalanlu | Kachuli | Kadkan | Kafch | Kafki | Kahak | Kahan | Kahan-e Pain | Kaheh | Kahijeh | Kahjah | Kahu | Kahu | Kaj Ab | Kaj Derakht | Kaj Derakht | Kaj Derakht | Kaj Olang | Kajabad | Kajghuneh | Kakhk | Kal Aqayeh-ye Olya | Kal Chuquki | Kal Qari | Kal Zarkesh | Kalat | Kalat | Kalateh Deh Now | Kalateh Menar | Kalateh Shirin | Kalateh-ye Abbas | Kalateh-ye Abd ol Samad | Kalateh-ye Abdalluhab | Kalateh-ye Abdol | Kalateh-ye Abdol | Kalateh-ye Abu ol Qasem | Kalateh-ye Abuzar | Kalateh-ye Ahan | Kalateh-ye Ahmad | Kalateh-ye Ahmadi | Kalateh-ye Akhund | Kalateh-ye Ali Khan | Kalateh-ye Ali Morad | Kalateh-ye Ali Siah | Kalateh-ye Ali Zeynal | Kalateh-ye Allah Nazar | Kalateh-ye Allah Resan | Kalateh-ye Andadeh | Kalateh-ye Aqa Mohammad | Kalateh-ye Aqazadeh | Kalateh-ye Arab | Kalateh-ye Arabha | Kalateh-ye Archinabad | Kalateh-ye Avaz | Kalateh-ye Azim | Kalateh-ye Bagh | Kalateh-ye Baqi Khan | Kalateh-ye Baraq-e Olya | Kalateh-ye Barfi | Kalateh-ye Bayat | Kalateh-ye Bozorg | Kalateh-ye Chapar Qaleh | Kalateh-ye Cheshmeh Alimva | Kalateh-ye Derakht-e Bid | Kalateh-ye Dowlat | Kalateh-ye Ebrahimabad | Kalateh-ye Fathabad-e Sharqi | Kalateh-ye Fazel | Kalateh-ye Feshay | Kalateh-ye Feyzabad | Kalateh-ye Gah | Kalateh-ye Gaz | Kalateh-ye Gazbalaki | Kalateh-ye Gows ol Din | Kalateh-ye Gurni | Kalateh-ye Hajj Ali | Kalateh-ye Hajji Ali Dad | Kalateh-ye Hajji Azim | Kalateh-ye Hajji Barat | Kalateh-ye Hajji Jahan Beyk | Kalateh-ye Hajji Motalleb | Kalateh-ye Hajji Nasir | Kalateh-ye Hajji Qazi | Kalateh-ye Hajji Rahmat | Kalateh-ye Hajji Shir Mohammad | Kalateh-ye Hajji | Kalateh-ye Hamid | Kalateh-ye Hasan | Kalateh-ye Hasanabad | Kalateh-ye Hazarat | Kalateh-ye Jabbar | Kalateh-ye Jafar | Kalateh-ye Jomeh | Kalateh-ye Jovin | Kalateh-ye Kandi | Kalateh-ye Kazem | Kalateh-ye Keyani | Kalateh-ye Khalilabad | Kalateh-ye Khan | Kalateh-ye Khuni | Kalateh-ye Khuni | Kalateh-ye Khvosh | Kalateh-ye Kolukh | Kalateh-ye Lakhi Jadid | Kalateh-ye Luyedani | Kalateh-ye Malu | Kalateh-ye Marvi | Kalateh-ye Mazar | Kalateh-ye Mazinan | Kalateh-ye Mesgarha | Kalateh-ye Meydan | Kalateh-ye Meymari | Kalateh-ye Mian | Kalateh-ye Mir Ali | Kalateh-ye Mir Hasan | Kalateh-ye Mirabbas | Kalateh-ye Mirza Jani | Kalateh-ye Mirza Mohammad Ali | Kalateh-ye Mirza Rajab | Kalateh-ye Moghri | Kalateh-ye Mohammad Jan | Kalateh-ye Mohammadabad | Kalateh-ye Molla Mohammad | Kalateh-ye Morrehi | Kalateh-ye Mown | Kalateh-ye Najaf | Kalateh-ye Nay | Kalateh-ye Now Bahar | Kalateh-ye Now | Kalateh-ye Now | Kalateh-ye Now | Kalateh-ye Now | Kalateh-ye Nuri | Kalateh-ye Pain Darreh | Kalateh-ye Payeh | Kalateh-ye Qadam | Kalateh-ye Qalichi | Kalateh-ye Qanbar | Kalateh-ye Qanbar Ali | Kalateh-ye Qazi | Kalateh-ye Qorban | Kalateh-ye Rahman | Kalateh-ye Reza Khan | Kalateh-ye Rezaiyeh | Kalateh-ye Sabz | Kalateh-ye Sadat | Kalateh-ye Sadat-e Bala | Kalateh-ye Sadu | Kalateh-ye Sahebdad | Kalateh-ye Said | Kalateh-ye Samad Khan | Kalateh-ye Sanam | Kalateh-ye Saqi | Kalateh-ye Saru | Kalateh-ye Sefid | Kalateh-ye Seyyed Ali | Kalateh-ye Seyyed Ali | Kalateh-ye Seyyed Sadeq | Kalateh-ye Seyyeda | Kalateh-ye Shadi | Kalateh-ye Shahab | Kalateh-ye Shahidan | Kalateh-ye Shams | Kalateh-ye Sheykhha | Kalateh-ye Sheykhi | Kalateh-ye Shuri | Kalateh-ye Soltani | Kalateh-ye Som | Kalateh-ye Sufi | Kalateh-ye Susnari-ye Bala | Kalateh-ye Teymur | Kalateh-ye Teymuri | Kalateh-ye Tir Kaman | Kalateh-ye Tolaki | Kalateh-ye Tut | Kalateh-ye Yesaval Bashi | Kalateh-ye Zaman | Kalateh-ye Zamanabad | Kalateh-ye Zanganeh | Kalateh-ye Zeynal | Kalavashk | Kalavashk | Kalavi | Kal-e Karab | Kal-e Malekabad | Kal-e Shur Jadid | Kal-e Sorkh | Kallar | Kalleh Menar | Kalow | Kalu | Kamalabad | Kamar Sabz | Kamar Zard | Kamarcheh | Kamarcheh-ye Olya | Kamarcheh-ye Sofla | Kamayestan | Kambalan | Kameh | Kameh Olya | Kameh Sofla | Kamin Geran | Kamiz | Kandakli | Kang | Kangak | Kang-e Olya | Kang-e Sofla | Kang-e Zeytun | Kanu Gerd | Kapkan | Karan | Karangan | Karat | Kardeh | Kareshk | Karghesh-e Olya | Karim Khan | Karimabad | Karimabad | Karimabad | Karimabad | Karimabad | Karimabad | Karimabad | Karimabad-e Suis | Kariz | Kariz | Kariz Darreh | Kariz Khaneh | Kariz Kohandel | Kariz Now | Kariz Now-e Sofla | Kariz Sukhteh | Karizak | Karizak | Karizak-e Hajji Pasand | Karizak-e Kenar Kal | Karizak-e Khujui | Karizak-e Kohneh | Karizak-e Nagahani | Karizak-e Yaqubkhani | Karizan-e Molla Ahmad | Kariz-e Bala | Kariz-e Bedaq | Kariz-e Diklan | Kariz-e Geli | Kariz-e Hajj Mohammad Jan | Kariz-e Now | Kariz-e Now | Kariz-e Now | Kariz-e Now | Kariz-e Sabah | Karizmeh | Karji Madan | Karji | Karjij | Karkhaneh-ye Qand | Karnaveh-ye Shirin | Karrab | Karyun | Kasabad-e Pain | Kasf | Kasgak | Kashaf | Kashk | Kashkak | Kashmar | Kaskan | Kasrineh | Kat | Kateh Gush | Kateh Shamshir-e Olya | Kateh Shamshir-e Sofla | Kateh Talkh | Kavandar | Kazemabad | Kazemabad | Kazemabad | Kazemabad | Kazemabad | Kazemabad-e Panjshanbeh | Kelidar | Kenar Gusheh | Kenevist | Aliabad-e Keshmar | Keyf | Keykhosrow | Keyzaqan | Keyzur | Khadar | Khadem Anlu | Khademabad | Khakhian | Khalaj | Khalaj-e Sofla | Khalilabad | Khalilabad | Khalilabad | Khalilabad | Khalili | Khalkanlu | Khaltabad-e Now Sazi | Khan Saadat | Khanabad | Khaneqah | Khaneqah | Khanik | Khanjari | Khanlanlu | Khanloq | Khanrud | Khanshah | Khar Barreh | Khar Firuzi | Khar Gerd | Khara Brickworks | Kharabeh Amin | Kharasf | Khargushi | Kharij | Kharkat | Kharq | Kharu | Kharv | Kharzar | Kharzar | Khatayan | Khatumeh | Khayesk | Khesht-e Nadari | Kheyam Industrial Estate | Kheybari | Kheydiz | Kheyrabad | Kheyrabad | Kheyrabad | Kheyrabad | Kheyrabad | Kheyrabad | Kheyrabad | Kheyrabad | Kheyrabad | Kheyrabad | Kheyrabad | Kheyrabad | Kheyrabad | Kheyrabad | Kheyrabad | Kheyrabad | Kheyrabad-e Olya | Kheyrabad-e Sharqi | Kheyrabad-e Sofla | Khezr Beyg | Khezrabad | Khiaban | Khij | Khin-e Arab | Khin-e Chomaqi | Khoda Shah | Khodaabad | Khodabandeh | Khodadad | Kholqabad-e Sofla | Khomartash | Khommi | Khorasanak | Khorombeyk | Khorram Bak | Khorram | Khorramabad | Khorramabad | Khorramabad | Khorramabad | Khorramabad | Khorramabad | Khorramabad | Khorramabad-e Olya | Khorramabad-e Sofla | Khoshab | Khosrow Shir | Khosrowabad | Khosrowabad | Khosrowjerd | Khujan | Khuk Ab | Khunabad | Khur | Khurq | Khush Manzal | Khvaf | Khvajeh Bachcheh | Khvajeh Beyg | Khvajeh Hoseynabad | Khvajeh Jarrah | Khvajeh Rowshanai | Khvajeh Taun | Khvajeh Vali | Khvajeh | Khvajehabad | Khvancheh | Khvor-e Olya | Khvor-e Sofla | Khvor-e Vosta | Khvoresh Bar | Khvorshaneh | Khvosh Darreh | Khvosh Hava | Khvosh Mardan | Khvoshab | Khvosh-e Bala | Kisk | Kohak | Kohneh Ab | Kohneh Forud | Kohneh | Kojnah | Kola Kub | Kolah Bakhsh | Kolukhi | Kolukhi | Komaj Khvor | Kondeh Sukhteh | Kondor | Kordian | Kordkanlu | Kortu | Koruj | Koruzhadeh | Koshgak | Kotlar | Kowdeh | Kuh Darreh | Kuh Sakht | Kuh Sefid-e Sofla | Kuhabad | Kuh-e Qaleh Sofla | Kuh-e Sefid | Kuhi | Kulab | Kurdeh | Kureh Ajarazargun | Kusan | Kusheh Nama | Kusheh | Kusheh | Kushk | Kushk | Kushkabad | Kushkak | Kushkan | Kushk-e Bagh | Kushk-e Mehdi

=== L ===
Laj | Lak Lag | Lak Lak Ashian | Landaran | Langar | Langar | Larhang | Latifabad | Layen-e Kohneh | Loqmani | Lotfabad | Lotfabad | Lukhi | Lukhi | Lush Ab-e Qalandarabad | Lushab-e Fariman

=== M ===
Madan | Madan-e Olya | Madan-e Sofla | Maghu | Mah Kariz | Mahabad | Mahabad-e Jadid | Mahabad-e Olya | Mahalleh-ye Zoshk-e Olya | Mahalleh-ye Zoshk-e Sofla | Mahmanshahr-e Torbat-e Jam | Mahmudabad | Mahmudabad | Mahmudabad | Mahmudabad-e Fazl | Mahmudabad-e Olya | Mahmudabad-e Sofla | Mahmudi | Majdabad | Maki | Malakh Darreh-ye Sofla | Malek Kandeh | Malekabad | Malekabad | Malekabad | Malekabad | Malekabad | Malvand | Mamadanlu | Mamiz Ab | Mamuri | Mamuri | Manidar | Manqeshli | Mansuri | Mansuriyeh | Mansuriyeh | Manzar | Manzar | Manzelabad | Maqsudabad | Maqsudabad | Maragheh | Marandiz | Marandiz | Mareshk | Marghesh | Marghesh | Marghzar | Marian | Marichgan | Marjaneh | Marus | Marusk | Marzan | Mashhad | Mashhad Factory Housing | Mashhad Industrial Estate | Mashhad Qoli | Mashhad Rizeh | Mashuleh | Masi Maskanlu | Maskan | Masumabad | Mava | Mayan-e Olya | Mayan-e Sofla | Mayan-e Vosta | Mazang | Mazar | Mazar-e Bi Abeh | Mazdavand | Mazdeh | Mazhdabad | Mazhnabad | Mazinan | Mazjerd | Mazraeh-ye Banyad Mastazafan | Mazraeh-ye Reza | Mazraeh-ye Sheykh | Mazraeh-ye Zaman Put | Meghas | Mehdi Soltan | Mehdiabad | Mehdiabad | Mehdiabad | Mehdiabad | Mehdiabad | Mehdiabad | Mehdiabad | Mehneh | Mehr | Mehrabad | Mehrabad | Mehrabad | Mehrabad | Mehrabad | Mehrabad | Mehrabad-e Shor Shor | Mehrshani | Mej | Mej | Melli | Mellu-e Olya | Mend | Menj-e Shirin | Mesgaran | Meshkan | Meshkanlu | Meyab | Meyami | Meymand | Mezerj | Mian Band | Mian Margh | Mian Sara | Mianabad | Miandehi | Miandehi | Miantu | Mikhak | Mikhak | Mina | Mir Aqa Beyk | Mir Bankesh | Mir Mohammad | Mir Qaleh | Mirabad | Mirabad | Mirabad | Mirabad | Mirabad | Mirpasand | Mirza Hasan | Mobarakeh | Moghan | Moghan | Moghan | Mohammad Hasan Beyg | Mohammad Taqi Beyg | Mohammad Vali Beyk | Mohammad Zurab | Mohammadabad | Mohammadabad | Mohammadabad | Mohammadabad | Mohammadabad | Mohammadabad | Mohammadabad | Mohammadabad | Mohammadabad | Mohammadabad | Mohammadabad | Mohammadabad | Mohammadabad | Mohammadabad | Mohammadabad-e Andaleyb | Mohammadabad-e Baluch | Mohammadabad-e Do Khaneh | Mohammadabad-e Gaft | Mohammadabad-e Gaft | Mohammadabad-e Ilkhani | Mohammadabad-e Lab-e Rud | Mohammadabad-e Olya | Mohammadabad-e Sar Cheshmeh Berashk | Mohammadabad-e Sharqi | Mohammadabad-e Sofla | Mohammadiyeh | Mohammadiyeh | Moharramabad | Moheb Saraj | Mohitabad | Mohsenabad | Mohsenabad | Mohsenabad | Mohsenabad | Moinabad-e Bala | Moinabad-e Sofla | Mokhalefgah | Mokhtari | Mollaabad | Momenabad | Momenabad | Momrabad | Monj | Moqimabad | Moqiseh | Moradabad | Moradabad | Mordar Keshan | Moskabad | Motamadiyeh | Motrabad | Mowmenabad | Mowtowr Ab-e Soltani | Mozaffarabad | Mozaffarabad | Mozaffarabad | Muchenan | Mur | Muri | Murshk | Musaabad | Musaabad | Musaabad | Mushak | Mushan | Musiraz |

=== N ===
Nafteh | Nahaldan | Nahrabad | Nahur | Naimabad | Naimabad | Najafabad | Najafabad | Najafi | Najm | Najmabad | Najmabad | Najmabad | Naman | Namdun | Nameq | Nanva | Naqareh Khaneh | Naqdali-ye Olya | Naqdali-ye Sofla | Naqdbesh | Narband | Narestan | Narg | Nari | Narimani-ye Olya | Narimani-ye Sofla | Nasar | Nashib | Nashtifan | Nasimabad | Nasirabad | Nasirabad | Nasrabad | Nasrabad | Nasrabad | Nasrabad | Nasrabad | Nasrabad | Nasrabad | Nasrabad | Nasrabad | Nasrabad | Nasrabad | Nasrabad | Nasrabad | Nasrabad-e Olya | Nasruyi | Natu | Navakh | Navakh | Navay | Naveshk | Nay | Nayyerabad | Nazarabad | Nazarabad | Nazarabad | Nazerabad | Nazeriyeh | Nazlabad | Nehesk | Nehjaz-e Pain | Neqab | Neqab | Neqab | Neqab | Neqab | Neyestan | Neyshaburak | Neyyat | Neyzar | Nezamabad | Nezamiyeh | Nian | Niazabad | Niazabad | Nik Pey | Nilshahr | Nirab-e Olya | Nishapur | Noqondar | Nosk | Nosratabad | Nosratabad | Nosratabad | Now Bagh | Now Bahar | Now Bahar | Now Bahar | Now Bahar-e Gholaman | Now Bahar-e Kordian | Now Bonyad-e Gonbadli | Now Chah | Now Deh | Now Deh | Now Dehan | Now Deh-e Arbab | Now Deh-e Gonabad | Now Deh-e Meyrmaharab | Now Deh-e Pashtak | Now Deh-e Sorsoreh | Now Khandan | Now Mehan | Nowabad | Nowabad-e Espian | Nowbahar | Nowbahar | Nowchah | Nowdeh | Nowmiri | Nowruzabad | Nowruzabad | Nowruzabad | Nowruzi | Nowruzi | Nowsara | Nowzad | Nowzeh | Nughab | Nuq | Nuq | Nur ol Din | Nurabad | Nurabad | Nurabad | Nurabad | Nurabad | Nuri

=== O ===
Ojnowrd | Olang Pasheh | Olang-e Asadi | Ordughesh | Orduluk | Orfi | Ortakand | Orteh Cheshmeh | Oryan | Ostad | Ostay | Ostay-ye Olya | Ostay-ye Sofla | Otorabad | Owlang-e Amanabad | Owlar | Owlya | Owtan | Owtanlu

=== P ===
Pa Baz | Pa Dar | Pa Godar | Pa Qaleh | Pachk | Padali | Padegan-e Quchan | Padehha | Padeh-ye Jan Morad | Padeh-ye Musa Khan | Pagodar-e Badvar | Pain Deh | Pakotal | Palkanlu-ye Olya | Palkanlu-ye Sofla | Pangi | Panj Maneh | Pariabad | Pariabad | Pariabad | Parkand | Parkandabad | Parmeh | Parvand | Pas Kamar | Pas Khvori | Pas Poshteh | Pasaveh | Pava | Pay Gadar | Petrow | Peyvand-e Kohneh | Pir Anjiri | Pir Gaz | Pir Komaj | Pir Vahsh | Piranlu | Pirshahbaz | Pish Baghan | Pishakhvor | Pishavak | Piveh Zhan | Pol Gazi | Pol Varzeh | Pol-e Band | Pol-e Gerd | Posht-e Sabad | Poshteh Abbas | Poshteh | Puch | Pushan | Pust Forushan | Pustin Duz

=== Q ===
Qabakh | Qabed | Qach Kanlu | Qadamgah | Qaderabad | Qaderabad | Qaderabad | Qaderabad | Qadirabad | Qajaq | Qalandarabad | Qalandarabad | Qaleh Dozdan | Qaleh Hammam | Qaleh Hammam-e Hajji Rasul | Qaleh Hasan | Qaleh Juq | Qaleh Kak | Qaleh Khaki | Qaleh Khiaban | Qaleh Meydan | Qaleh Ney | Qaleh Now | Qaleh Now | Qaleh Now | Qaleh Now | Qaleh Now | Qaleh Now-e Abgheh | Qaleh Now-e Andarekh | Qaleh Now-e Avaraz | Qaleh Now-e Faz | Qaleh Now-e Jamshid | Qaleh Now-e Kalateh Menar | Qaleh Now-e Mastufi | Qaleh Now-e Mirza Jafar | Qaleh Now-e Olya | Qaleh Now-e Shamlu | Qaleh Now-e Valiabad | Qaleh Now-ye Alireza Bek | Qaleh Now-ye Fariman | Qaleh Now-ye Mehdiabad | Qaleh Now-ye Safiabad | Qaleh Pokhtuk | Qaleh Qassab | Qaleh Sangi | Qaleh Shir | Qaleh Shira | Qaleh Shisheh | Qaleh Sorkh | Qaleh Vazir | Qalehcheh | Qaleh-ye Abbas | Qaleh-ye Aqa Hasan | Qaleh-ye Now | Qaleh-ye Now | Qaleh-ye Now | Qaleh-ye Sorkh | Qaleh-ye Sorkh | Qalibaf-e Olya | Qalibaf-e Sofla | Qanbarabad | Qand Torbat-e Jam Factory | Qandak-e Khurdeh Malkin | Qandeshtan | Qapaqtaz | Qara Cheshmeh | Qaracheh | Qarah Aqach | Qarah Bagh | Qarah Chay | Qarah Dash | Qarah Jangal | Qarah Jeqqeh | Qarah Khan | Qarah Kuseh | Qarah Mohammad | Qarah Qeytan | Qarah Sangi | Qarah Shahverdi | Qarah Su | Qarah Takan | Qarah Tikan | Qareh Beyk | Qareh Cheh | Qareh Gol | Qareh Qoli | Qareh Quyunlu | Qariyeh Sharaf | Qarjqah | Qarneh-ye Sofla | Qarqanatu | Qaruchan | Qaruneh | Qasemabad | Qasemabad | Qasemabad | Qasemabad | Qasemabad | Qasemabad | Qasemabad | Qasemabad | Qasemabad | Qasemabad | Qasemabad | Qasemi | Qasemi | Qashqabad | Qasr | Qatar Chah | Qatar Gaz | Qatnabad | Qaz | Qazan-e Beyk | Qazlar | Qazqan | Qazqan Darreh | Qazqaveh | Qelichabad | Qelichabad | Qerqereh | Qesh Robat | Qeshlaq | Qeshlaq | Qeshlaq-e Pain Hesar | Qeytaqi | Qezel Hesar | Qezel Kan | Qezel Qaleh | Qiasabad | Qiasabad-e Olya | Qohandiz | Qol Quchan | Qolleh Zu | Qom | Qorbanabad | Qoreyshabad | Qoroq | Qorqi-ye Olya | Qorqi-ye Sofla | Qorqoruk-e Olya | Qorqoruk-e Sofla | Qosheh Tut | Qosun | Qozloq | Quch Palang | Quchan | Quchan Industrial Estate | Quljoq | Qumi | Qush Aghel | Qush-e Alijan | Qush-e Azim | Qush-e Chaker | Qush-e Khazai | Qush-e Kohneh | Qush-e Sarbuzi | Quzan | Quzhd | Quzhd | Quzhdabad

=== R ===
Radkan | Rah Chaman | Rahimabad | Rahimabad | Rahimabad | Rahimabad | Rahimabad | Rahmanniyeh | Rahmanqoli | Rahmatabad | Rahmatabad | Rahmatabad | Rahmatabad | Rahmatabad | Rahmatabad | Rahn Kariz | Rahn | Rahneh | Rahvard | Raisi | Ramazan Qaleh | Ramshin | Ranajabad | Raqqasan | Rasan | Rashidabad | Rashtkhvar | Ravang | Raz Qand | Raz | Razan | Razaviyeh | Razdab | Razg | Razg | Razmgah-e Olya | Razmgah-e Sofla | Razun | Razuyeh | Red Crescent Building Number 1 | Reyhan | Rezaabad | Rezaabad-e Gijan Samedi | Rezaabad-e Sarhang | Rezaabad-e Sharqi | Rezaabad-e Taheri | Rezaiyeh | Rezavieh | Rezqabad | Rezu Sofla | Rezvan | Riab | Rigan | Rigi | Ringan | Rishkhvar | Rivadeh | Rivand | Rivand | Rivash | Rizab | Robat Hadireh | Robat Sefid | Robat | Robat | Robat | Robat-e Jaz | Robat-e Khakestari | Robat-e Mian Dasht | Robat-e Sang | Robat-e Sar Push | Robat-e Toroq | Robati Gharbatha | Robati Shahzadeh | Robati | Robatu | Roknabad | Roqicheh | Rostamabad | Rovenj | Rowghan Garan | Rowshanabad | Ru Sang | Ruchi | Rud Ab | Rud Majan | Rud Sarab | Rud | Rud-e Khin | Rudkhaneh | Ruhabad | Ruhabad | Ruhabad | Ruhabad | Ruki | Rushnavand |

=== S ===
Saadat Qoli-ye Olya | Saadat Qoli-ye Sofla | Saadatabad | Sabbeh | Sabri | Sabzevar | Sad Kharu | Sad ol Din | Sadabad | Sadabad | Sadabad | Sadabad | Sadabad | Sadabad-e Arab | Sadat | Sadeqabad | Sadrabad | Sadrabad | Safiabad | Safiabad | Safiabad | Saghravan | Sahebdad | Sahel Borj | Sahl ol Din | Sahlabad | Sahlabad | Saidabad | Saidiyeh | Sakhdar | Salahi | Salami | Salanquch | Salarabad | Salari | Saleh Khani | Salehabad | Salehabad | Salehabad-e Bozorg | Salehiyeh | Salimabad | Salman | Salmanabad | Samadabad | Samadiyeh | Samakhun | Samandar | Samangan | Samangan | Samangan | Samar Ghaveh | Samghan | Samiabad-e Arbab Din Mohammad | Samiabad-e Hajji Aman | Samqan | Sang Bast | Sang Divar | Sangab | Sangalabad | Sangan | Sangan-e Bala Khvaf | Sanganeh | Sangar | Sangbar | Sangbar | Sang-e Atash | Sang-e Atash | Sang-e Atash | Sang-e Kalidar | Sang-e Noqreh | Sang-e Pir | Sang-e Sefid | Sang-e Sefid | Sang-e Siah | Sang-e Surakh | Sanguni | Sanjerd | Sanqasi | Sanqoz-e Bala | Sanqoz-e Pain | Sanqoz-e Vosta | Sanu | Saq | Saqar Cheshmeh-ye Sofla | Saqeshk | Saqi Beyg | Saqi | Sar Ab | Sar Ab-e Kushk | Sar Asiab | Sar Asiab | Sar Asiab | Sar Asiab | Sar Asiab-e Bala | Sar Asiab-e Pain | Sar Bala | Sar Borj | Sar Borj | Sar Chah | Sar Daq | Sar Dasht | Sar Deh | Sar Galan | Sar Gerik | Sar Ghayeh | Sar Godar | Sar Howzak | Sar Jangal | Sar Kariz | Sar Mazdeh | Sar Nish | Sar Rud | Sar Rud | Sar Tavus | Sarab | Sarab | Sarajeh | Sarakhs | Sarang-e Sofla | Sardab | Sarhang | Sarian-e Olya | Sarideh | Sarish | Sark | Sarnakhavab-e Sofla | Sartalkh | Sarujeh | Saruq | Sarvabad | Sarzow | Saveh | Sebi | Sebyan | Sedeh | Sedid | Sefar Qaleh | Sefid Bala | Sefid Sang | Seh Chub | Seh Gonbad | Seh Panjeh | Senjedak | Senjedak | Senjedpur | Senjetak | Senjetak | Senowbar | Serisha | Seviz | Seyah Lakh | Seyfabad | Seyfabad | Seyuki | Seyyedabad | Seyyedabad | Seyyedabad | Seyyedabad | Seyyedabad | Seyyedabad | Seyyedabad | Seyyedabad | Seyyedabad-e Akrad | Seyyedabad-e Asadollah Khan | Seyyedabad-e Bar Madan | Seyyedabad-e Kalut | Seyyedha | Shabankareh | Shabeh | Shad Mehrak | Shad Mianeh | Shadab | Shadi | Shadman | Shadmehr | Shafi | Shafiabad | Shafiabad | Shafiabad | Shah Galdi | Shah Niaz | Shah Nil | Shah Rag | Shah Rah | Shah Taqi | Shah Tut | Shahabad | Shahan-e Garmab | Shahdabad | Shahid Hashemi Nizhad | Shahid Kamju | Shahin Qaleh | Shahin-e Olya | Shahnabad | Shahr Jadid-e Golbahar | Shahr Sukhteh | Shahrabad | Shahrabad | Shahrabad | Shahrabad | Shahrabad | Shahrah | Shahrak | Shahrak | Shahrak-e Emam Khomeyni | Shahrak-e Emam | Shahrak-e Karkhaneh Qand Jowayin | Shahrak-e Mohammad Hajji | Shahrak-e Shahid Daktar Beheshti | Shahrak-e Zeyndanlu | Shahrdansh | Shahr-e Ain | Shahr-e Kohneh | Shahr-e Kohneh | Shahr-e Kohneh | Shahr-e Zow | Shahrestanak | Shahrestanak | Shahvar | Shakrabad | Shakrallah | Shalaqeh | Shalghami-ye Olya | Shalghami-ye Sofla | Shamabad | Shamkan | Shamkhal | Shamsabad | Shamsabad | Shamsabad | Shamsabad | Shamsabad | Shamsabad | Shamsabad | Shamsabad | Shamsabad | Shamsiyeh | Shandiz | Shareh | Shariatabad | Sharifabad | Sharifabad | Shashak | Shaye | Shekar Tu | Shelangerd | Shelgerd | Shend | Sherkat-e Kharam | Sherkat-e Madaras | Sheshtomad | Sheshtuk | Shestan Olya | Sheykh Abu ol Qasem | Sheykh Kanlu | Sheykh Khanlu | Sheykh Mostafa | Sheykhabad | Sheykhha | Sheykhlan | Sheykhlu | Sheykhvanlu-ye Olya | Sheykhvanlu-ye Sofla | Shib | Shileh Goshad | Shiligan | Shir Hesar | Shir Hesar | Shir Khan | Shir Khun | Shir Tappeh | Shirabad | Shirazabad | Shirgerd | Shirin | Shirinabad | Shirzan | Shizan | Shoghlabad | Shor Shor | Shotor Khosb | Shotor Pa | Shotor Sang | Shotorak | Showkatiyeh | Shur Ab | Shur Ab-e Olya | Shur Ab-e Sofla | Shur Ab-e Vosta | Shur Gesht | Shur Hesar | Shur Kal | Shur Rud | Shurab | Shurab | Shurab | Shurab | Shurab-e Jahan | Shurab-e Nusazi | Shurab-e Olya | Shurab-e Olya | Shurab-e Sofla | Shurak | Shurak-e Maleki | Shurak-e Saburi | Shurbeyg | Shurcheh | Shurestan | Shurestan-e Olya | Shurestan-e Sofla | Shuricheh-ye Olya | Shuricheh-ye Sofla | Shuri-ye Bozorg | Shurloq | Shurok-e Hajji | Shurok-e Tupkanlu | Shurvarz | Shuryab | Shuy | Siah Khowleh | Siah Sang | Siah Sang | Siasak | Sij | Sijavand | Siman | Sinab | Sini | Sini-ye Now | Sir Zar | Sir | Sirghan | Sirzar | Sirzar | Sisabad | Soleymani | Soleymani | Soleymani | Soleymaniyeh | Solhabad | Soltan Meydan | Soltan Soleyman | Soltanabad | Soltanabad | Soltanabad | Soltanabad | Soltanabad | Soltanabad | Soltanabad | Soltanabad-e Namak | Solugerd | Somaqcheh | Somman | Somsara-ye Olya | Somsara-ye Sofla | Sonbol | Sonqorabad | Soqiyeh | Sorkh | Sorkh Sara | Sorkhabad | Sorkhi | Sowhan | Sowmeeh | Sowmeeh | Sowmeeh | Sowmeeh-ye Bozorg | Sowmeeh-ye Kuchak | Sowqand | Sowrastan | Sud Khor | Sugaldi | Suleh | Suran | Suran | Suzandeh

=== T ===
Tabadakan | Tabas | Tabrik | Tagan | Taherabad | Taherabad | Taherabad | Taherabad | Taherabad-e Barbaryeha | Taherabad-e Mian | Taherabad-e Torkha | Taherabad-e Torkha Jadid | Taht-e Manzar | Taj ol Din | Tajabad | Tajar | Tajrud | Tajrud | Tak Mar | Tak Meydan | Tak-e Zow | Takhteh-ye Kazemabad | Takruk-e Sofla | Talabad | Talebi | Talebi | Talkh Bakhsh | Talkh ol Naqi | Talkhak | Talkhi | Talqur | Tam-e Mirza Hasan | Tam-e Mokhtar | Tam-e Rasul | Tangal-e Mazar | Tangal-e Shur-e Olya | Tangeh-ye Olya | Tanurjeh | Tappeh Lik | Tappeh Nader | Tappeh Salam | Tappeh-ye Jik | Tappeh-ye Mir Ahmad | Taqan | Taqiabad | Taqiabad | Taqiabad | Taqiabad | Taqiabad | Taqiabad | Taqiabad | Tarababad | Taraz-e Khaki | Tarkhas | Tarqetey | Tarqi | Tasband | Tavalli | Tavandar | Tavil | Tavil | Taybad | Tazar | Tazraq | Telgerd | Telli | Teymanak-e Olya | Teymanak-e Sofla | Teymurabad | Tijan | Tiran | Tirgan | Tiz Ab | Tolki | Tomandar | Tondok | Toqoz-e Olya | Toqoz-e Sofla | Torbat-e Heydarieh | Torbat-e Jam | Torbeqan | Toroq | Toroq | Torosk | Torqabeh | Towqi | Tufal | Tukla Bagh | Tuklabad | Tunah | Tup Derakht | Turaneh | Turani | Turusk | Tus Industrial Estate | Tus-e Olya | Tus-e Sofla | Tut Ban | Tut-e Lashkaran | Tut-e Safar | Tut-e Seyyed Mohammad | Tuzandeh Jan-e Kohneh | Tuzandeh Jan-e Now | Tuzanlu

=== U ===
Umi

=== V ===
Vakilabad-e Pain Jam | Valiabad | Vaset | Vaziriyeh | Vila Shahr | Virani | Voru

=== Y ===
Yadak | Yadegar | Yadegar-e Olya | Yadegar-e Sofla | Yahyaabad | Yahyaabad | Yahyaabad | Yahyaabad | Yahyaabad | Yahyaabad | Yahyaabad | Yakhak | Yakhdan | Yam | Yanbolaq | Yang | Yaqubabad | Yaqul | Yaqutin-e Jadid | Yas Tappeh | Yasaqi | Yazdanabad-e Olya | Yazdanabad-e Sharqi | Yazdanabad-e Sofla | Yek Lengeh | Yek Lengeh-ye Olya | Yekkeh Bagh | Yekkeh Bid | Yekkeh Pesteh | Yekkeh Tut | Yekkehbagh | Yengeh Qaleh | Yengeh Qaleh-ye Havadanlu | Yengejeh | Yengi Qaleh | Yunesi | Yurd Chupan | Yusef Khan | Yusefabad | Yusefabad | Yusefabad | Yusefabad | Yusefabad

=== Z ===
Zabol Qaleh | Zadak | Zafaraniyeh | Zaherabad | Zahirabad-e Pain | Zak | Zakaria | Zalabad | Zallughal | Zaman Put | Zamanabad | Zamanabad | Zamanabad | Zamand | Zammeh | Zanaqol | Zangelanlu | Zangineh | Zarandeh | Zarandeh | Zard Kuhi | Zari Zi | Zarkak | Zarkak | Zarkesh | Zarmehr | Zarnukh | Zarqan | Zarqi | Zarvand | Zavader-e Olya | Zavang-e Olya | Zavang-e Sofla | Zaveh | Zehab | Zendeh Jan | Zeydabad | Zeydanlu | Zeyn ol Din | Zeynabad | Zeyndanlu-ye Olya | Zeyndanlu-ye Sofla | Zharf | Zharf | Zia ol Din-e Olya | Ziarat | Ziarat | Zibad | Zig | Zingar | Zir Vaqt | Zirabad | Zirakabad | Zirjan | Zirjan | Zirkan | Ziruk | Zohab | Zohan | Zoshk | Zow-e Bala | Zozan | Zu Khanu | Zu ol Farrokh | Zu Salehabad | Zubaran | Zurabad
