= Aqanj =

Aqanj اقنج
- Village
- Location within Iran
- Coordinates: 36°05′41″N 59°33′06″E
- Country: Iran
- Province: Razavi Khorasan
- County: Mashhad
- Bakhsh: Ahmadabad
- Rural District: Sarjam

Population (2006)
  - Total: 69
- Time zone: UTC+3:30 (IRST)
  - Summer (DST): UTC+4:30 (IRDT)

Aqanj (Persian: اقنج, also Romanized as Āqanj, Āqenj, and Āqonj; also known as Āghonj, Aghanj, and Aghunj) is a village in Sarjam Rural District, Ahmadabad District, Mashhad County, Razavi Khorasan Province, Iran. At the 2006 census, its population was 69, in 18 families.

== See also ==
- List of cities, towns and villages in Razavi Khorasan Province
