= Abgineh =

Abgineh ابگينه
- Village
- Country: Iran
- Province: Razavi Khorasan
- County: Nishapur
- Bakhsh: Central
- Rural District: Rivand
- Time zone: UTC+3:30 (IRST)
  - Summer (DST): UTC+4:30 (IRDT)

Abgineh (Persian: ابگينه, also Romanized as Ābgīneh) is a village in Rivand Rural District, in the Central District of Nishapur County, Razavi Khorasan Province, Iran. In the 2006 census, it was first mentioned, despite not having its population reported.

== See also ==
- List of cities, towns and villages in Razavi Khorasan Province
