= Bagh-e Farajerd =

Bagh-e Farajerd باغ فراگرد
- Village
- Location within Iran
- Coordinates: 36°25′00″N 59°37′36″E
- Country: Iran
- Province: Razavi Khorasan
- County: Mashhad
- Bakhsh: Central
- Rural District: Tabadkan

Population (2006)
  - Total: 514
- Time zone: UTC+3:30 (IRST)
  - Summer (DST): UTC+4:30 (IRDT)

Bagh-e Farajerd (Persian: باغ فراگرد, also Romanizeed as Bāgh-e Farājerd; also known as Bāgh-e Farhād Gerd) is a village in Tabadkan Rural District, in the Central District of Mashhad County, Razavi Khorasan Province, Iran. At the 2006 census, its population was 514, in 131 families.

== Gallery ==
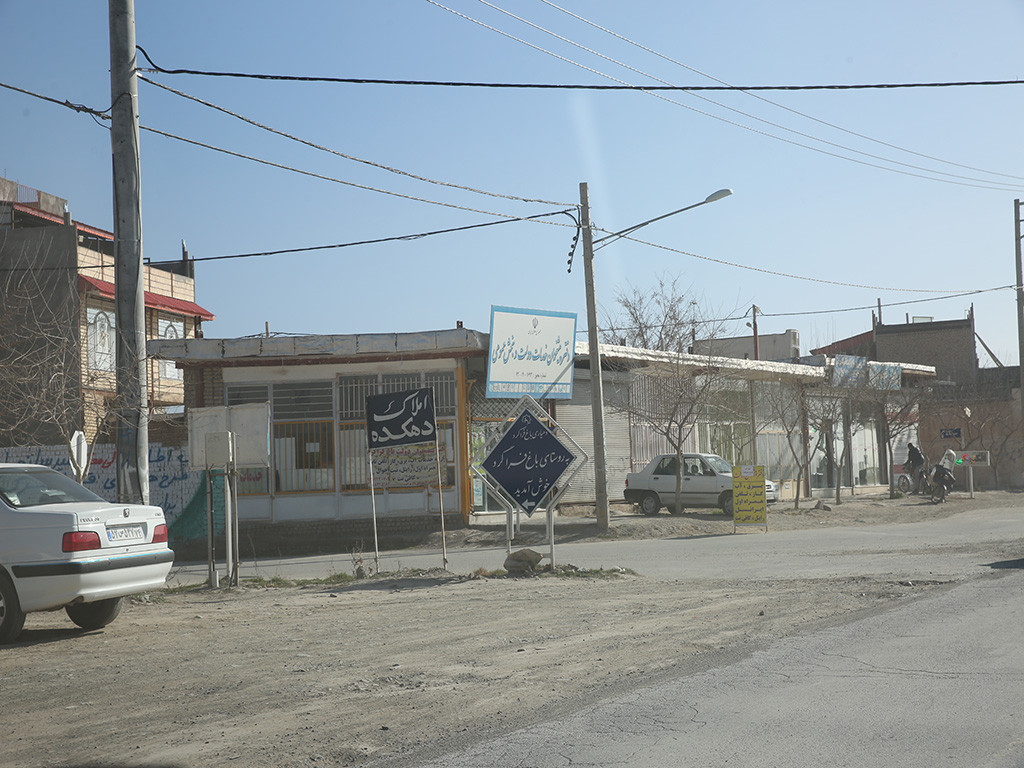
Bagh-e Farajerd village

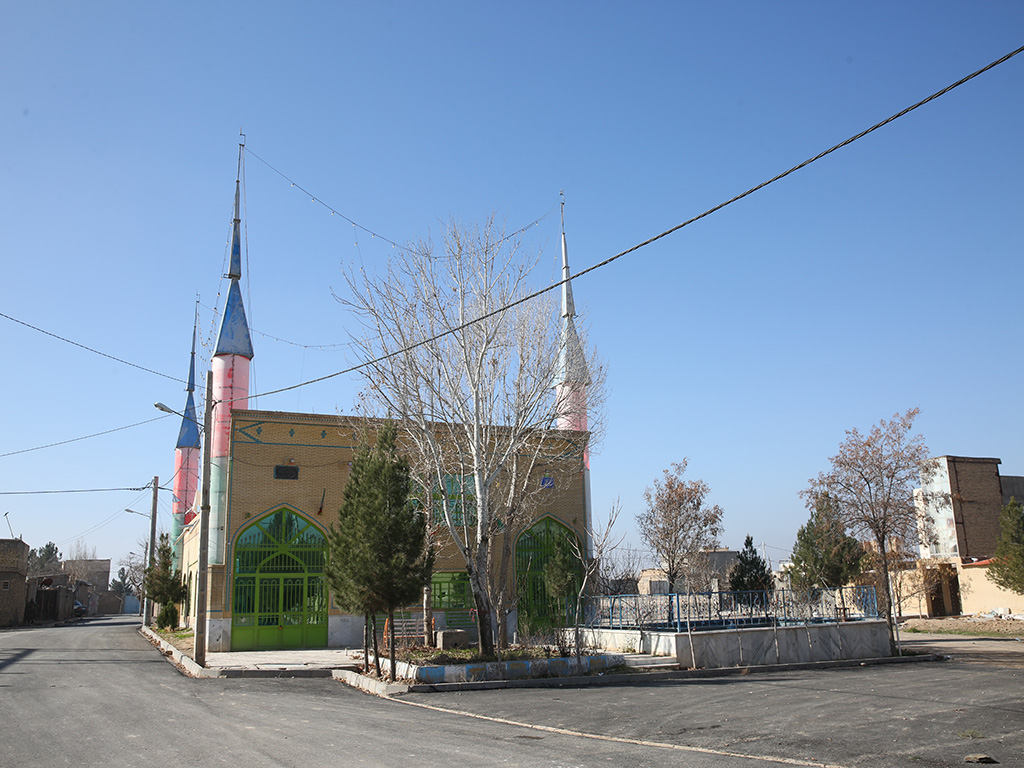
Bagh-e Farajerd Village mosque

== See also ==
- List of cities, towns and villages in Razavi Khorasan Province
