= Ba Sharik =

Ba Sharik باشريك
- Village
- Location within Iran
- Coordinates: 36°26′48″N 59°32′10″E
- Country: Iran
- Province: Razavi Khorasan
- County: Mashhad
- Bakhsh: Central
- Rural District: Tus

Population (2006)
  - Total: 78
- Time zone: UTC+3:30 (IRST)
  - Summer (DST): UTC+4:30 (IRDT)

Ba Sharik (Persian: باشريك, also Romanized as Bā Sharīḵ) is a village in the Tus Rural District of Mashhad County, Razavi Khorasan Province, Iran. In the 2006 census, its population was 78, in 19 families.

== See also ==
- List of cities, towns and villages in Razavi Khorasan Province
