= Aq Qayah =

Aq Qayah اق قايه
- Village
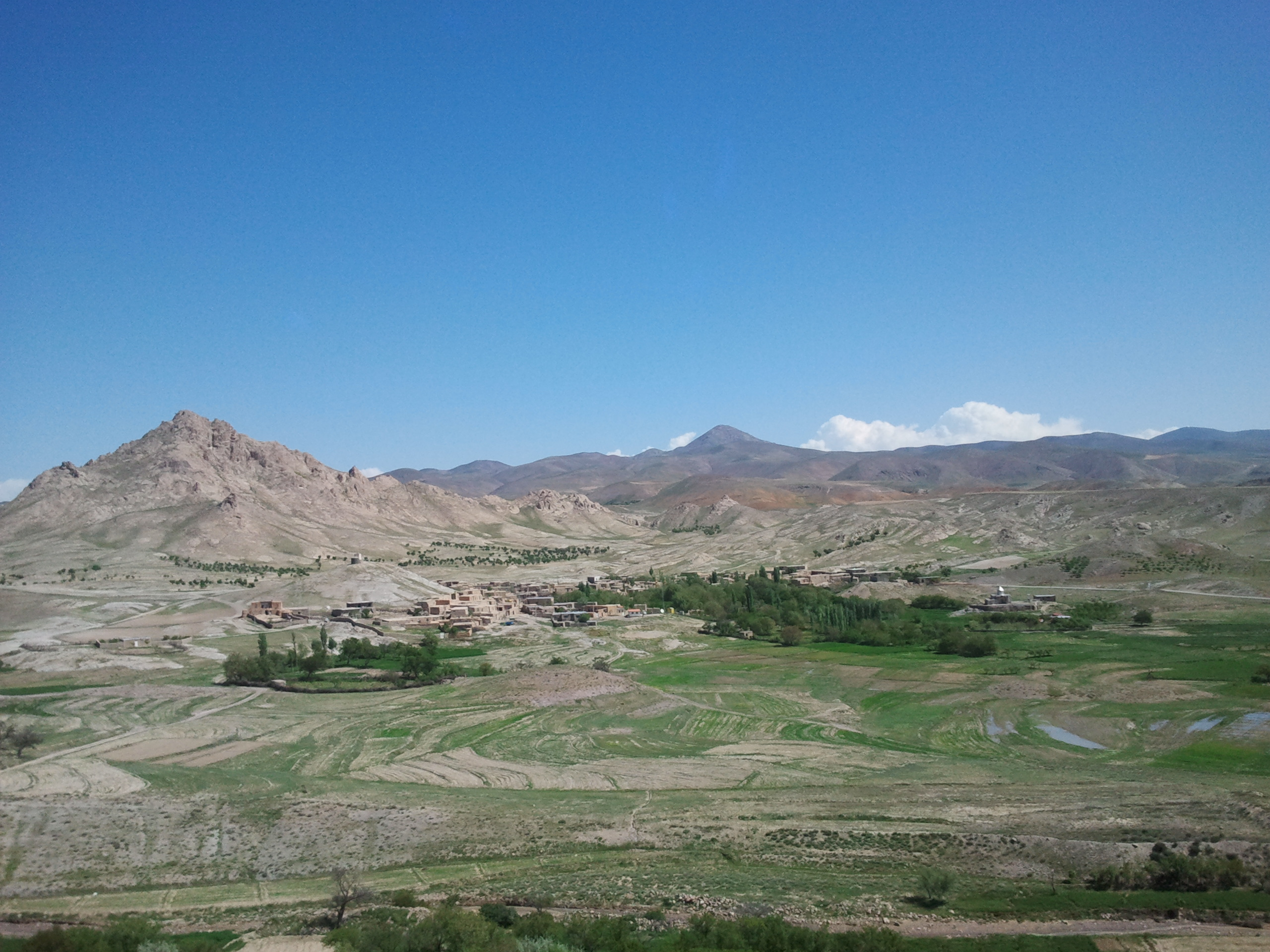

- Location within Iran
- Coordinates: 36°53′01″N 58°17′02″E
- Country: Iran
- Province: Razavi Khorasan
- County: Nishapur
- Bakhsh: Sarvelayat
- Rural District: Sarvelayat

Population (2006)
  - Total: 348
- Time zone: UTC+3:30 (IRST)
  - Summer (DST): UTC+4:30 (IRDT)

Aq Qayah (Persian: اق قايه, also Romanized as Āq Qayah; also known as Agh Ghayeh, Āqāyeh, and Āq Qīyeh) is a village in Sarvelayat Rural District, Sarvelayat District, Nishapur County, Razavi Khorasan Province, Iran. At the 2006 census, its population was 348, in 100 families.

== See also ==
- List of cities, towns and villages in Razavi Khorasan Province
