= Andorokh =

Village in Razavi Khorasan, Iran

Andorokh اندرخ
- Village
- Location within Iran
- Coordinates: 36°34′54″N 59°39′31″E
- Country: Iran
- Province: Razavi Khorasan
- County: Mashhad
- Bakhsh: Central
- Rural District: Tabadkan

Population (2006)
  - Total: 528
- Time zone: UTC+3:30 (IRST)
  - Summer (DST): UTC+4:30 (IRDT)

Andorokh (Persian: اندرخ, also Romanized as Andarokh; also known as Andarūkh and Andeh Lūs) is a village in Tabadkan Rural District, in the Central District of Mashhad County, Razavi Khorasan Province, Iran. At the 2006 census, its population was 528, in 142 families.

== See also ==
- List of cities, towns and villages in Razavi Khorasan Province
