= Bid Khan =

Bid Khan بيدخان
- Village
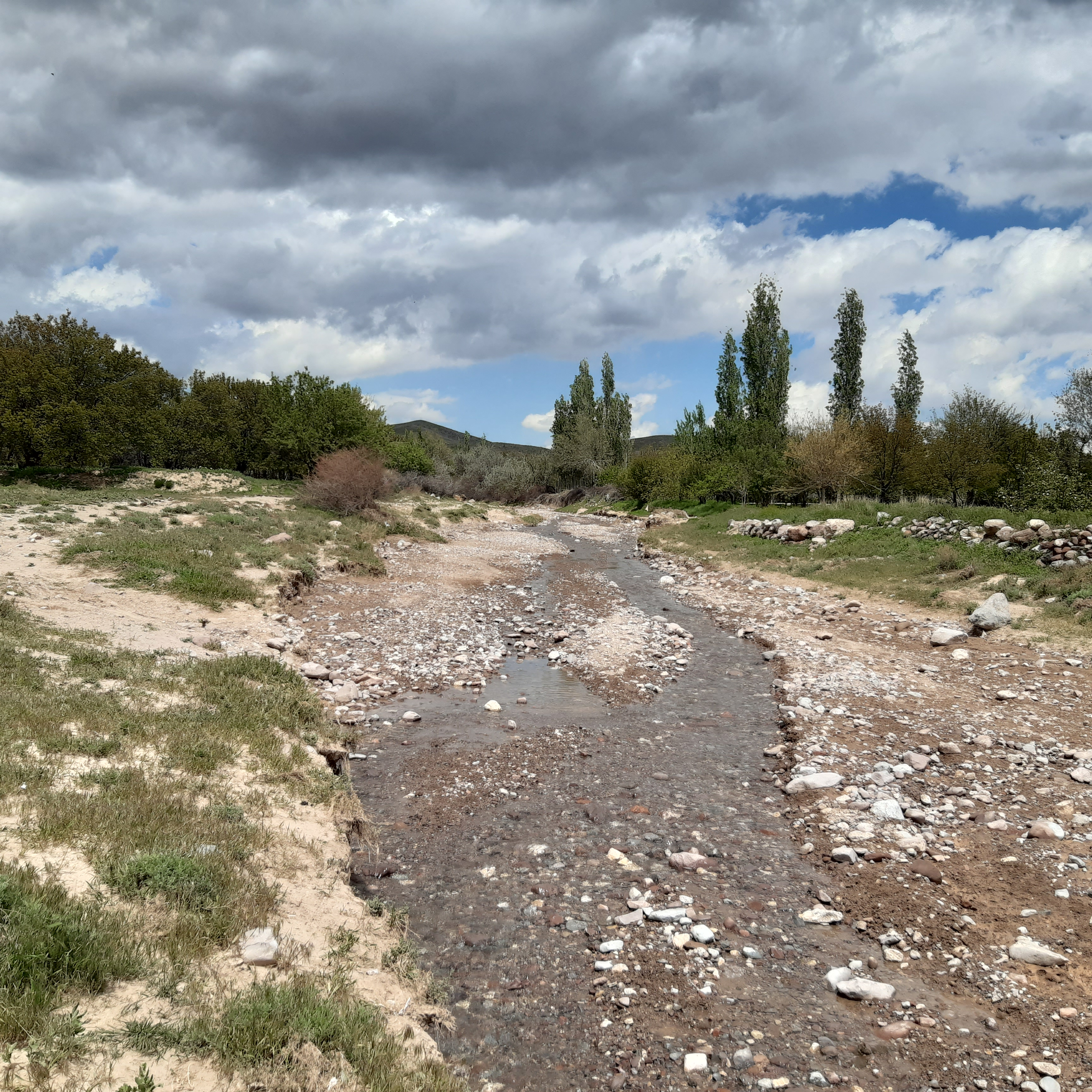
- Bidkhan Kalateh Gardens

- Location within Iran
- Coordinates: 36°49′56″N 58°23′29″E
- Country: Iran
- Province: Razavi Khorasan
- County: Nishapur
- Bakhsh: Sarvelayat
- Rural District: Sarvelayat

Population (2006)
  - Total: 401
- Time zone: UTC+3:30 (IRST)
  - Summer (DST): UTC+4:30 (IRDT)

Bid Khan (Persian: بيدخان, also Romanized as Bīd Khān; also known as Bīdkhār) is a village in Sarvelayat Rural District, Sarvelayat District, Nishapur County, Razavi Khorasan Province, Iran. At the 2006 census, its population was 401, in 105 families.

== See also ==
- List of cities, towns and villages in Razavi Khorasan Province
