= Abquy =

Abquy ابقوي
- Village
- Location within Iran
- Coordinates: 36°21′21″N 58°41′37″E
- Country: Iran
- Province: Razavi Khorasan
- County: Nishapur
- Bakhsh: Central
- Rural District: Mazul

Population (2006)
  - Total: 227
- Time zone: UTC+3:30 (IRST)
  - Summer (DST): UTC+4:30 (IRDT)

Abquy (Persian: ابقوي, also Romanized as Ābqūy) is a village in Mazul Rural District, in the Central District of Nishapur County, Razavi Khorasan Province, Iran. At the 2006 census, its population was 227, in 59 families.

== See also ==
- List of cities, towns and villages in Razavi Khorasan Province
