= Biavand =

Biavand بياوند
- Village
- Location within Iran
- Coordinates: 35°50′13″N 60°06′50″E
- Country: Iran
- Province: Razavi Khorasan
- County: Mashhad
- Bakhsh: Razaviyeh
- Rural District: Abravan

Population (2006)
  - Total: 137
- Time zone: UTC+3:30 (IRST)
  - Summer (DST): UTC+4:30 (IRDT)

Biavand (Persian: بياوند, also Romanized as Bīāvand) is a village in Abravan Rural District, Razaviyeh District, Mashhad County, Razavi Khorasan Province, Iran. At the 2006 census, its population was 137, in 36 families.

== See also ==
- List of cities, towns and villages in Razavi Khorasan Province
