= Ferezni =

Ferezni فرزني
- Village
- Location within Iran
- Coordinates: 35°54′18″N 59°32′20″E
- Country: Iran
- Province: Razavi Khorasan
- County: Mashhad
- Bakhsh: Ahmadabad
- Rural District: Sarjam

Population (2006)
  - Total: 55
- Time zone: UTC+3:30 (IRST)
  - Summer (DST): UTC+4:30 (IRDT)

Ferezni (Persian: فرزني, also Romanized as Fereznī; also known as Ferīznī) is a village in Sarjam Rural District, Ahmadabad District, Mashhad County, Razavi Khorasan Province, Iran. At the 2006 census, its population was 55, in 16 families.

== See also ==
- List of cities, towns and villages in Razavi Khorasan Province
