= Ab Barik, Razavi Khorasan =

Ab Barik اب باريك
- Village
- Location within Iran
- Coordinates: 36°09′58″N 57°58′58″E
- Country: Iran
- Province: Razavi Khorasan
- County: Sabzevar
- Bakhsh: Central
- Rural District: Robat

Population (2006)
  - Total: 43
- Time zone: UTC+3:30 (IRST)
  - Summer (DST): UTC+4:30 (IRDT)

Ab Barik (Persian: اب باريك, also Romanized as Āb Bārīk; also known as Ābāresh, and Ubarak) is a village in Robat Rural District, in the Central District of Sabzevar County, Razavi Khorasan province, Iran. At the 2006 census, its population was 43, in 13 families.

== See also ==
- List of cities, towns and villages in Razavi Khorasan province
