= Benesbard-e Sofla =

Benesbard-e Sofla بنس بردسفلي
- Village
- Location within Iran
- Coordinates: 35°44′24″N 57°14′02″E
- Country: Iran
- Province: Razavi Khorasan
- County: Sabzevar
- Bakhsh: Rud Ab
- Rural District: Kuh Hamayi

Population (2006)
  - Total: 73
- Time zone: UTC+3:30 (IRST)
  - Summer (DST): UTC+4:30 (IRDT)

Benesbard-e Sofla (Persian: بنس بردسفلي, also Romanized as Benesbard-e Soflá; also known as Benesbard-e Pā’īn and Benesarūd-e Pā’īn) is a village in Kuh Hamayi Rural District, Rud Ab District, Sabzevar County, Razavi Khorasan Province, Iran. At the 2006 census, its population was 73, in 21 families.

== See also ==
- List of cities, towns and villages in Razavi Khorasan Province
