= Kalateh-ye Ali Morad =

Kalateh-ye Ali Morad كلاته علي مراد
- Village
- Location within Iran
- Coordinates: 36°34′01″N 58°30′14″E
- Country: Iran
- Province: Razavi Khorasan
- County: Nishapur
- Bakhsh: Central
- Rural District: Binalud

Population (2006)
  - Total: 33
- Time zone: UTC+3:30 (IRST)
  - Summer (DST): UTC+4:30 (IRDT)

Kalateh-ye Ali Morad (Persian: كلاته علي مراد, also Romanized as Kalāteh-ye ‘Alī Morād) is a village in Binalud Rural District, in the Central District of Nishapur County, Razavi Khorasan Province, Iran. At the 2006 census, its population was 33, in 7 families.
