= Owlar =

Owlar اولر
- Village
- Location within Iran
- Coordinates: 36°10′41″N 58°11′22″E
- Country: Iran
- Province: Razavi Khorasan
- County: Sabzevar
- Bakhsh: Central
- Rural District: Robat

Population (2006)
  - Total: 39
- Time zone: UTC+3:30 (IRST)
  - Summer (DST): UTC+4:30 (IRDT)

Owlar (Persian: اولر; also known as Rabīʿyeh) is a village in Robat Rural District, in the Central District of Sabzevar County, Razavi Khorasan Province, Iran. At the 2006 census, its population was 39, in 10 families.
