= Khorram Bak =

Khorram Bak خرمبك
- Village
- Location within Iran
- Coordinates: 36°15′03″N 58°45′06″E
- Country: Iran
- Province: Razavi Khorasan
- County: Nishapur
- Bakhsh: Central
- Rural District: Mazul

Population (2006)
  - Total: 694
- Time zone: UTC+3:30 (IRST)
  - Summer (DST): UTC+4:30 (IRDT)

Khorram Bak (Persian: خرمبك; also known as Khorram Beya, Khorram Beyg, Khorram Beyk, and Khorramak) is a village in Mazul Rural District, in the Central District of Nishapur County, Razavi Khorasan Province, Iran. At the 2006 census, its population was 694, in 173 families.
