= Bormahan =

Bormahan برمهان
- Village
- Location within Iran
- Coordinates: 36°33′54″N 58°37′40″E
- Country: Iran
- Province: Razavi Khorasan
- County: Nishapur
- Bakhsh: Central
- Rural District: Binalud

Population (2006)
  - Total: 267
- Time zone: UTC+3:30 (IRST)
  - Summer (DST): UTC+4:30 (IRDT)

Bormahan (Persian: برمهان, also Romanized as Bormahān) is a village in Binalud Rural District, in the Central District of Nishapur County, Razavi Khorasan Province, Iran. At the 2006 census, its population was 267, in 62 families.
