= Mashhad Qoli =

Mashhad Qoli مشهدقلي
- Village
- Interactive map of Mashhad Qoli
- Country: Iran
- Province: Razavi Khorasan
- County: Mashhad
- Bakhsh: Central
- Rural District: Tus

Population (2006)
  - Total: 21,093
- Time zone: UTC+3:30 (IRST)
  - Summer (DST): UTC+4:30 (IRDT)

Mashhad Qoli (Persian: مشهدقلي, also Romanized as Mashhad Qolī; also known as Shahrak Maṭahar) is a village in Tus Rural District, in the Central District of Mashhad County, Razavi Khorasan Province, Iran. At the 2006 census, its population was 21,093, in 5,358 families.
