= Derangabad =

Derangabad درنگ اباد
- Village
- Location within Iran
- Coordinates: 36°39′06″N 59°26′54″E
- Country: Iran
- Province: Razavi Khorasan
- County: Mashhad
- Bakhsh: Central
- Rural District: Darzab

Population (2006)
  - Total: 232
- Time zone: UTC+3:30 (IRST)
  - Summer (DST): UTC+4:30 (IRDT)

Derangabad (Persian: درنگ اباد, also Romanized as Derangābād) is a village in Darzab Rural District, in the Central District of Mashhad County, Razavi Khorasan Province, Iran. At the 2006 census, its population was 232, in 57 families.
