= Gowd-e Asia =

Gowd-e Asia گوداسيا
- Village
- Location within Iran
- Coordinates: 36°15′33″N 57°31′30″E
- Country: Iran
- Province: Razavi Khorasan
- County: Sabzevar
- Bakhsh: Central
- Rural District: Qasabeh-ye Gharbi

Population (2006)
  - Total: 390
- Time zone: UTC+3:30 (IRST)
  - Summer (DST): UTC+4:30 (IRDT)

Gowd-e Asia (Persian: گوداسيا, also Romanized as Gowd-e Āsīā) is a village in Qasabeh-ye Gharbi Rural District, in the Central District of Sabzevar County, Razavi Khorasan Province, Iran. As of the 2006 census, its population is 390, with 143 families living in the village.
