= Qaleh Now-e Avaraz =

Qaleh Now-e Avaraz قلعه نوعوارض
- Village
- Location within Iran
- Coordinates: 36°22′34″N 59°32′39″E
- Country: Iran
- Province: Razavi Khorasan
- County: Mashhad
- Bakhsh: Central
- Rural District: Tus

Population (2006)
  - Total: 12,011
- Time zone: UTC+3:30 (IRST)
  - Summer (DST): UTC+4:30 (IRDT)

Qaleh Now-e Avaraz (Persian: قلعه نوعوارض, also Romanized as Qal‘eh Now-e ‘Avāraz̤; also known as Qal‘eh Now-e Bahrābād, Qal‘eh Now-e Bahrād, and Qal‘eh Now-e Qā’emmaqāmī) is a village in Tus Rural District, in the Central District of Mashhad County, Razavi Khorasan Province, Iran. At the 2006 census, its population was 12,011, in 3,040 families.
