= Kal Chuquki =

Kal Chuquki كال چوقوكي
- Village
- Location within Iran
- Coordinates: 36°02′31″N 59°45′10″E
- Country: Iran
- Province: Razavi Khorasan
- County: Mashhad
- Bakhsh: Razaviyeh
- Rural District: Meyami

Population (2006)
  - Total: 746
- Time zone: UTC+3:30 (IRST)
  - Summer (DST): UTC+4:30 (IRDT)

Kal Chuquki (Persian: كال چوقوكي, also Romanized as Kāl Chūqūkī, Kālchoqūkī, Kālchūqakī, Kālchūqūkī, and Kāl-e Choqūkī) is a village in Meyami Rural District, Razaviyeh District, Mashhad County, Razavi Khorasan Province, Iran. At the 2006 census, its population was 746, in 175 families.
