= Jomhuri, Iran =

Jomhuri جمهوري
- Village
- Location within Iran
- Coordinates: 36°11′07″N 58°39′19″E
- Country: Iran
- Province: Razavi Khorasan
- County: Nishapur
- Bakhsh: Central
- Rural District: Mazul

Population (2006)
  - Total: 15
- Time zone: UTC+3:30 (IRST)
  - Summer (DST): UTC+4:30 (IRDT)

Jomhuri (Persian: جمهوري, also Romanized as Jomhūrī; also known as Jambūrī) is a village in Mazul Rural District, in the Central District of Nishapur County, Razavi Khorasan Province, Iran. At the 2006 census, its population was 15, in 6 families.
