= Kalateh-ye Abuzar =

Kalateh-ye Abuzar كلاته ابوذر
- Village
- Location within Iran
- Coordinates: 36°35′19″N 58°29′22″E
- Country: Iran
- Province: Razavi Khorasan
- County: Nishapur
- Bakhsh: Central
- Rural District: Binalud

Population (2006)
  - Total: 39
- Time zone: UTC+3:30 (IRST)
  - Summer (DST): UTC+4:30 (IRDT)

Kalateh-ye Abuzar (Persian: كلاته ابوذر, also Romanized as Kalāteh-ye Abūz̄ar; also known as Kalāteh-ye Shāhīn) is a village in Binalud Rural District, in the Central District of Nishapur County, Razavi Khorasan Province, Iran. At the 2006 census, its population was 39, in 9 families.
