= Pirshahbaz =

Pirshahbaz پيرشهباز
- Village
- Location within Iran
- Coordinates: 36°52′56″N 58°14′17″E
- Country: Iran
- Province: Razavi Khorasan
- County: Nishapur
- Bakhsh: Sarvelayat
- Rural District: Sarvelayat

Population (2006)
  - Total: 164
- Time zone: UTC+3:30 (IRST)
  - Summer (DST): UTC+4:30 (IRDT)

Pirshahbaz (Persian: پيرشهباز, also Romanized as Pīrshahbāz) is a village in Sarvelayat Rural District, Sarvelayat District, Nishapur County, Razavi Khorasan Province, Iran. At the 2006 census, its population was 164, in 36 families.
