= Qabed =

Qabed قبد
- Village
- Location within Iran
- Coordinates: 36°10′06″N 58°47′37″E
- Country: Iran
- Province: Razavi Khorasan
- County: Nishapur
- Bakhsh: Central
- Rural District: Rivand

Population (2006)
  - Total: 54
- Time zone: UTC+3:30 (IRST)
  - Summer (DST): UTC+4:30 (IRDT)

Qabed (Persian: قبد, also Romanized as Qobeyd) is a village in Rivand Rural District, in the Central District of Nishapur County, Razavi Khorasan Province, Iran. At the 2006 census, its population was 54, in 20 families.
