= Shahid Kamju =

Shahid Kamju شهيدكامجو
- Village
- Location within Iran
- Coordinates: 36°23′12″N 59°38′22″E
- Country: Iran
- Province: Razavi Khorasan
- County: Mashhad
- Bakhsh: Central
- Rural District: Tabadkan

Population (2006)
  - Total: 430
- Time zone: UTC+3:30 (IRST)
  - Summer (DST): UTC+4:30 (IRDT)

Shahid Kamju (Persian: شهيدكامجو, also Romanized as Shahīd Kāmjū; also known as Shahīd Nāmjū) is a village in Tabadkan Rural District, in the Central District of Mashhad County, Razavi Khorasan Province, Iran. At the 2006 census, its population was 430, in 112 families.
