= Khorasanak =

Khorasanak خراسانك
- Village
- Location within Iran
- Coordinates: 36°38′41″N 59°22′59″E
- Country: Iran
- Province: Razavi Khorasan
- County: Mashhad
- Bakhsh: Central
- Rural District: Darzab

Population (2006)
  - Total: 12
- Time zone: UTC+3:30 (IRST)
  - Summer (DST): UTC+4:30 (IRDT)

Khorasanak (Persian: خراسانك, also Romanized as Khorāsānak; also known as Khvorestāneh) is a village in Darzab Rural District, in the Central District of Mashhad County, Razavi Khorasan Province, Iran. At the 2006 census, its population was 12, in 7 families.
