= Kalateh-ye Dowlat =

Kalateh-ye Dowlat كلاته دولت
- Village
- Location within Iran
- Coordinates: 36°09′50″N 57°37′01″E
- Country: Iran
- Province: Razavi Khorasan
- County: Sabzevar
- Bakhsh: Central
- Rural District: Qasabeh-ye Gharbi

Population (2006)
  - Total: 145
- Time zone: UTC+3:30 (IRST)
  - Summer (DST): UTC+4:30 (IRDT)

Kalateh-ye Dowlat (Persian: كلاته دولت, also Romanized as Kalāteh-ye Dowlat; also known as Dowlat) is a village in Qasabeh-ye Gharbi Rural District, in the Central District of Sabzevar County, Razavi Khorasan Province, Iran. At the 2006 census, its population was 145, in 34 families.
