= Jufurush =

Jufurush جوفروش
- Village
- Location within Iran
- Coordinates: 36°27′35″N 59°29′09″E
- Country: Iran
- Province: Razavi Khorasan
- County: Mashhad
- Bakhsh: Central
- Rural District: Tus

Population (2006)
  - Total: 40
- Time zone: UTC+3:30 (IRST)
  - Summer (DST): UTC+4:30 (IRDT)

Jufurush (Persian: جوفروش, also Romanized as Jūfurūsh) is a village in Tus Rural District, in the Central District of Mashhad County, Razavi Khorasan Province, Iran. At the 2006 census, its population was 40, in 9 families.
