= Kenar Gusheh =

Kenar Gusheh كنارگوشه
- Village
- Location within Iran
- Coordinates: 36°21′04″N 59°46′04″E
- Country: Iran
- Province: Razavi Khorasan
- County: Mashhad
- Bakhsh: Central
- Rural District: Kenevist

Population (2006)
  - Total: 204
- Time zone: UTC+3:30 (IRST)
  - Summer (DST): UTC+4:30 (IRDT)

Kenar Gusheh (Persian: كنارگوشه, also Romanized as Kenār Gūsheh; also known as Kaneh Gūsheh) is a village in Kenevist Rural District, in the Central District of Mashhad County, Razavi Khorasan Province, Iran. At the 2006 census, its population was 204, in 47 families.
