= Kanu Gerd =

Kanu Gerd كنوگرد
- Village
- Location within Iran
- Coordinates: 36°23′00″N 59°40′00″E
- Country: Iran
- Province: Razavi Khorasan
- County: Mashhad
- Bakhsh: Central
- Rural District: Tabadkan

Population (2006)
  - Total: 32
- Time zone: UTC+3:30 (IRST)
  - Summer (DST): UTC+4:30 (IRDT)

Kanu Gerd (Persian: كنوگرد, also Romanized as Kanū Gerd; also known as Ganū Gerd, Kaneh Gerd, and Kano Gird) is a village in Tabadkan Rural District, in the Central District of Mashhad County, Razavi Khorasan Province, Iran. At the 2006 census, its population was 32, in 9 families.
