= Kalateh-ye Qazi =

Kalateh-ye Qazi كلاته قاضي
- Village
- Location within Iran
- Coordinates: 36°24′45″N 59°35′49″E
- Country: Iran
- Province: Razavi Khorasan
- County: Mashhad
- Bakhsh: Central
- Rural District: Tabadkan

Population (2006)
  - Total: 65
- Time zone: UTC+3:30 (IRST)
  - Summer (DST): UTC+4:30 (IRDT)

Kalateh-ye Qazi (Persian: كلاته قاضي, also Romanized as Kalāteh-ye Qāẕī) is a village in Tabadkan Rural District, in the Central District of Mashhad County, Razavi Khorasan Province, Iran. At the 2006 census, its population was 65, in 16 families.
