= Sahl ol Din =

Sahl ol Din سهل الدين
- Village
- Location within Iran
- Coordinates: 36°31′08″N 59°26′48″E
- Country: Iran
- Province: Razavi Khorasan
- County: Mashhad
- Bakhsh: Central
- Rural District: Miyan Velayat

Population (2006)
  - Total: 80
- Time zone: UTC+3:30 (IRST)
  - Summer (DST): UTC+4:30 (IRDT)

Sahl ol Din (Persian: سهل الدين, also Romanized as Sahl ol Dīn; also known as Sahl ed Dīn) is a village in Miyan Velayat Rural District, in the Central District of Mashhad County, Razavi Khorasan Province, Iran. At the 2006 census, its population was 80, in 17 families.
