= Nowsara =

Nowsara نوسرا
- Village
- Location within Iran
- Coordinates: 36°46′07″N 58°23′48″E
- Country: Iran
- Province: Razavi Khorasan
- County: Nishapur
- Bakhsh: Sarvelayat
- Rural District: Sarvelayat

Population (2006)
  - Total: 189
- Time zone: UTC+3:30 (IRST)
  - Summer (DST): UTC+4:30 (IRDT)

Nowsara (Persian: نوسرا, also Romanized as Nowsarā) is a village in Sarvelayat Rural District, Sarvelayat District, Nishapur County, Razavi Khorasan Province, Iran. At the 2006 census, its population was 189, in 49 families.
