= Ghezel Aghul =

Ghezel Aghul غزل اغول
- Village
- Location within Iran
- Coordinates: 36°40′57″N 58°22′19″E
- Country: Iran
- Province: Razavi Khorasan
- County: Nishapur
- Bakhsh: Sarvelayat
- Rural District: Sarvelayat

Population (2006)
  - Total: 17
- Time zone: UTC+3:30 (IRST)
  - Summer (DST): UTC+4:30 (IRDT)

Ghezel Aghul (Persian: غزل اغول, also Romanized as Ghezel Āghūl and Qezel Āghūl) is a village in Sarvelayat Rural District, Sarvelayat District, Nishapur County, Razavi Khorasan Province, Iran. At the 2006 census, its population was 17, in 4 families.
