= Yek Lengeh =

Yek Lengeh يك لنگه
- Village
- Location within Iran
- Coordinates: 36°15′15″N 58°44′24″E
- Country: Iran
- Province: Razavi Khorasan
- County: Nishapur
- Bakhsh: Central
- Rural District: Mazul

Population (2006)
  - Total: 372
- Time zone: UTC+3:30 (IRST)
  - Summer (DST): UTC+4:30 (IRDT)

Yek Lengeh (Persian: يك لنگه) is a village in Mazul Rural District, in the Central District of Nishapur County, Razavi Khorasan Province, Iran. At the 2006 census, its population was 372, in 99 families.
