= Saleh Khani =

Saleh Khani صالح خاني
- Village
- Location within Iran
- Coordinates: 35°53′40″N 60°16′10″E
- Country: Iran
- Province: Razavi Khorasan
- County: Mashhad
- Bakhsh: Razaviyeh
- Rural District: Pain Velayat

Population (2006)
  - Total: 72
- Time zone: UTC+3:30 (IRST)
  - Summer (DST): UTC+4:30 (IRDT)

Saleh Khani (Persian: صالح خاني, also Romanized as Şāleḩ Khānī; also known as Kalāteh-ye Şāleḩ Khānī) is a village in Pain Velayat Rural District, Razaviyeh District, Mashhad County, Razavi Khorasan Province, Iran. At the 2006 census, its population was 72, in 18 families.
