= Qaleh Now-e Andarekh =

Qaleh Now-e Andarekh قلعه نواندرخ
- Village
- Country: Iran
- Province: Razavi Khorasan
- County: Mashhad
- Bakhsh: Central
- Rural District: Tabadkan

Population (2006)
  - Total: 153
- Time zone: UTC+3:30 (IRST)
  - Summer (DST): UTC+4:30 (IRDT)

Qaleh Now-e Andarekh (Persian: قلعه نواندرخ, also Romanized as Qal‘eh Now-e Āndarekh) is a village in Tabadkan Rural District, in the Central District of Mashhad County, Razavi Khorasan Province, Iran. At the 2006 census, its population was 153, in 40 families.
