= Gandom Khvab =

Gandom Khvab گندم خواب
- Village
- Location within Iran
- Coordinates: 36°32′20″N 59°30′11″E
- Country: Iran
- Province: Razavi Khorasan
- County: Mashhad
- Bakhsh: Central
- Rural District: Darzab

Population (2006)
  - Total: 80
- Time zone: UTC+3:30 (IRST)
  - Summer (DST): UTC+4:30 (IRDT)

Gandom Khvab (Persian: گندم خواب, also Romanized as Gandom Khvāb and Gandom Khavāb) is a village in Darzab Rural District, in the Central District of Mashhad County, Razavi Khorasan Province, Iran. At the 2006 census, its population was 80, in 23 families.
