= Borjmuri =

Borjmuri برج موري
- Village
- Location within Iran
- Coordinates: 35°50′16″N 60°21′11″E
- Country: Iran
- Province: Razavi Khorasan
- County: Mashhad
- Bakhsh: Razaviyeh
- Rural District: Pain Velayat

Population (2006)
  - Total: 79
- Time zone: UTC+3:30 (IRST)
  - Summer (DST): UTC+4:30 (IRDT)

Borjmuri (Persian: برج موري, also Romanized as Borjmūrī; also known as Borj Marvī) is a village in Pain Velayat Rural District, Razaviyeh District, Mashhad County, Razavi Khorasan Province, Iran. At the 2006 census, its population was 79, in 21 families.
