= Tappeh Nader =

Tappeh Nader تپه نادر
- Village
- Location within Iran
- Coordinates: 35°52′29″N 60°08′01″E
- Country: Iran
- Province: Razavi Khorasan
- County: Mashhad
- Bakhsh: Razaviyeh
- Rural District: Abravan

Population (2006)
  - Total: 51
- Time zone: UTC+3:30 (IRST)
  - Summer (DST): UTC+4:30 (IRDT)

Tappeh Nader (Persian: تپه نادر, also Romanized as Tappeh Nāder) is a village in Abravan Rural District, Razaviyeh District, Mashhad County, Razavi Khorasan Province, Iran. At the 2006 census, its population was 51, in 15 families.
