= Hasan Shahab =

Hasan Shahab حسن شهاب
- Village
- Location within Iran
- Coordinates: 36°24′10″N 59°35′23″E
- Country: Iran
- Province: Razavi Khorasan
- County: Mashhad
- Bakhsh: Central
- Rural District: Tabadkan

Population (2006)
  - Total: 98
- Time zone: UTC+3:30 (IRST)
  - Summer (DST): UTC+4:30 (IRDT)

Hasan Shahab (Persian: حسن شهاب, also Romanized as Ḩasan Shahāb; also known as Ḩasan Shoqā and Ḩasan Shaqāb) is a village in Tabadkan Rural District, in the Central District of Mashhad County, Razavi Khorasan Province, Iran. At the 2006 census, its population was 98, in 22 families.
