= Kalateh-ye Cheshmeh Alimva =

Kalateh-ye Cheshmeh Alimva كلاته چشمه عليمو
- Village
- Location within Iran
- Coordinates: 36°32′19″N 59°28′22″E
- Country: Iran
- Province: Razavi Khorasan
- County: Mashhad
- Bakhsh: Central
- Rural District: Darzab

Population (2006)
  - Total: 38
- Time zone: UTC+3:30 (IRST)
  - Summer (DST): UTC+4:30 (IRDT)

Kalateh-ye Cheshmeh Alimva (Persian: كلاته چشمه عليمو, also Romanized as Kalāteh-ye Cheshmeh ‘Alīmva; also known as Kalāteh-ye Cheshmeh ‘Alīvān) is a village in Darzab Rural District, in the Central District of Mashhad County, Razavi Khorasan Province, Iran. At the 2006 census, its population was 38, in 12 families.
