= Bereyli =

Bereyli بريلي
- Village
- Location within Iran
- Coordinates: 35°49′14″N 60°34′05″E
- Country: Iran
- Province: Razavi Khorasan
- County: Mashhad
- Bakhsh: Razaviyeh
- Rural District: Pain Velayat

Population (2006)
  - Total: 75
- Time zone: UTC+3:30 (IRST)
  - Summer (DST): UTC+4:30 (IRDT)

Bereyli (Persian: بريلي, also Romanized as Bereylī) is a village in Pain Velayat Rural District, Razaviyeh District, Mashhad County, Razavi Khorasan Province, Iran. At the 2006 census, its population was 75, in 21 families.
