= Mashuleh =

Mashuleh ماشوله
- Village
- Location within Iran
- Coordinates: 36°09′26″N 60°00′15″E
- Country: Iran
- Province: Razavi Khorasan
- County: Mashhad
- Bakhsh: Razaviyeh
- Rural District: Abravan

Population (2006)
  - Total: 164
- Time zone: UTC+3:30 (IRST)
  - Summer (DST): UTC+4:30 (IRDT)

Mashuleh (Persian: ماشوله, also Romanized as Māshūleh) is a village in Abravan Rural District, Razaviyeh District, Mashhad County, Razavi Khorasan Province, Iran. At the 2006 census, its population was 164, in 35 families.
