= Naqdbesh =

Naqdbesh نقدبش
- Village
- Location within Iran
- Coordinates: 36°07′22″N 58°50′41″E
- Country: Iran
- Province: Razavi Khorasan
- County: Nishapur
- Bakhsh: Central
- Rural District: Darbqazi

Population (2006)
  - Total: 50
- Time zone: UTC+3:30 (IRST)
  - Summer (DST): UTC+4:30 (IRDT)

Naqdbesh (Persian: نقدبش; also known as Nagdābesh, Naqdābshar, Naqdbīsh, and Naqdesh) is a village in Darbqazi Rural District, in the Central District of Nishapur County, Razavi Khorasan Province, Iran. At the 2006 census, its population was 50, in 13 families.
