= Hesar Juq =

Hesar Juq حصارجوق
- Village
- Location within Iran
- Coordinates: 36°15′11″N 58°45′06″E
- Country: Iran
- Province: Razavi Khorasan
- County: Nishapur
- Bakhsh: Central
- Rural District: Mazul

Population (2006)
  - Total: 419
- Time zone: UTC+3:30 (IRST)
  - Summer (DST): UTC+4:30 (IRDT)

Hesar Juq (Persian: حصارجوق, also Romanized as Ḩeşār Jūq) is a village in Mazul Rural District, in the Central District of Nishapur County, Razavi Khorasan Province, Iran. At the 2006 census, its population was 419, in 99 families.
