= Kalateh-ye Teymuri =

Kalateh-ye Teymuri كلاته تيموري
- Village
- Location within Iran
- Coordinates: 36°27′16″N 59°34′04″E
- Country: Iran
- Province: Razavi Khorasan
- County: Mashhad
- Bakhsh: Central
- Rural District: Tabadkan

Population (2006)
  - Total: 48
- Time zone: UTC+3:30 (IRST)
  - Summer (DST): UTC+4:30 (IRDT)

Kalateh-ye Teymuri (Persian: كلاته تيموري, also Romanized as Kalāteh-ye Teymūrī; also known as Kalāteh-ye Mūrī) is a village in Tabadkan Rural District, in the Central District of Mashhad County, Razavi Khorasan Province, Iran. At the 2006 census, its population was 48, in 12 families.
