= Shad Mianeh =

Shad Mianeh شادميانه
- Village
- Location within Iran
- Coordinates: 36°06′06″N 58°54′20″E
- Country: Iran
- Province: Razavi Khorasan
- County: Nishapur
- Bakhsh: Central
- Rural District: Darbqazi

Population (2006)
  - Total: 273
- Time zone: UTC+3:30 (IRST)
  - Summer (DST): UTC+4:30 (IRDT)

Shad Mianeh (Persian: شادميانه, also Romanized as Shād Mīāneh; also known as Shād Mehneh) is a village in Darbqazi Rural District, in the Central District of Nishapur County, Razavi Khorasan Province, Iran. At the 2006 census, its population was 273, in 83 families.
