= Khvosh-e Bala =

Khvosh-e Bala خوش بالا
- Village
- Location within Iran
- Coordinates: 36°11′23″N 58°51′24″E
- Country: Iran
- Province: Razavi Khorasan
- County: Nishapur
- Bakhsh: Central
- Rural District: Fazl

Population (2006)
  - Total: 419
- Time zone: UTC+3:30 (IRST)
  - Summer (DST): UTC+4:30 (IRDT)

Khvosh-e Bala (Persian: خوش بالا, also Romanized as Khvosh-e Bālā and Khowsh-e Bālā) is a village in Fazl Rural District, in the Central District of Nishapur County, Razavi Khorasan Province, Iran. At the 2006 census, its population was 419, in 110 families.
