= Qaleh Khiaban =

Qaleh Khiaban قلعه خيابان
- Village
- Location within Iran
- Coordinates: 36°14′47″N 59°43′02″E
- Country: Iran
- Province: Razavi Khorasan
- County: Mashhad
- Bakhsh: Razaviyeh
- Rural District: Meyami

Population (2006)
  - Total: 25,666
- Time zone: UTC+3:30 (IRST)
  - Summer (DST): UTC+4:30 (IRDT)

Qaleh Khiaban (Persian: قلعه خيابان, also Romanized as Qal‘eh Khīābān) is a village in Meyami Rural District, Razaviyeh District, Mashhad County, Razavi Khorasan Province, Iran. At the 2006 census, its population was 25,666, in 5,727 families.
