= Takruk-e Sofla =

Takruk-e Sofla تكروك سفلي
- Village
- Location within Iran
- Coordinates: 35°50′05″N 59°17′25″E
- Country: Iran
- Province: Razavi Khorasan
- County: Mashhad
- Bakhsh: Ahmadabad
- Rural District: Piveh Zhan

Population (2006)
  - Total: 107
- Time zone: UTC+3:30 (IRST)
  - Summer (DST): UTC+4:30 (IRDT)

Takruk-e Sofla (Persian: تكروك سفلي, also Romanized as Takrūk-e Soflá; also known as Takrūk-e Pā’īn) is a village in Piveh Zhan Rural District, Ahmadabad District, Mashhad County, Razavi Khorasan Province, Iran. As of the 2006 census, its population was 107, in 28 families.
