= Sar Nish =

Sar Nish سرنيش
- Village
- Location within Iran
- Coordinates: 35°50′53″N 59°29′48″E
- Country: Iran
- Province: Razavi Khorasan
- County: Mashhad
- Bakhsh: Ahmadabad
- Rural District: Sarjam

Population (2006)
  - Total: 234
- Time zone: UTC+3:30 (IRST)
  - Summer (DST): UTC+4:30 (IRDT)

Sar Nish (Persian: سرنيش, also Romanized as Sar Nīsh) is a village in Sarjam Rural District, Ahmadabad District, Mashhad County, Razavi Khorasan Province, Iran. At the 2006 census, its population was 234, in 64 families.
