= Fakhriyeh =

Fakhriyeh فخريه
- Village
- Location within Iran
- Coordinates: 36°10′51″N 58°50′08″E
- Country: Iran
- Province: Razavi Khorasan
- County: Nishapur
- Bakhsh: Central
- Rural District: Fazl

Population (2006)
  - Total: 299
- Time zone: UTC+3:30 (IRST)
  - Summer (DST): UTC+4:30 (IRDT)

Fakhriyeh (Persian: فخريه, also Romanized as Fakhrīyeh; also known as Fakhrīyeh Va Kalāteh-ye Ḩabashī) is a village in Fazl Rural District, in the Central District of Nishapur County, Razavi Khorasan Province, Iran. At the 2006 census, its population was 299, in 83 families.
