= Kalateh-ye Qorban =

Kalateh-ye Qorban كلاته قربان
- Village
- Location within Iran
- Coordinates: 36°32′57″N 59°21′31″E
- Country: Iran
- Province: Razavi Khorasan
- County: Mashhad
- Bakhsh: Central
- Rural District: Miyan Velayat

Population (2006)
  - Total: 45
- Time zone: UTC+3:30 (IRST)
  - Summer (DST): UTC+4:30 (IRDT)

Kalateh-ye Qorban (Persian: كلاته قربان, also Romanized as Kalāteh-ye Qorbān) is a village in Miyan Velayat Rural District, in the Central District of Mashhad County, Razavi Khorasan Province, Iran. At the 2006 census, its population was 45, in 11 families.
