= Sar Tavus =

Sar Tavus سرطاووس
- Village
- Location within Iran
- Coordinates: 36°25′11″N 59°41′17″E
- Country: Iran
- Province: Razavi Khorasan
- County: Mashhad
- Bakhsh: Central
- Rural District: Tabadkan

Population (2006)
  - Total: 12
- Time zone: UTC+3:30 (IRST)
  - Summer (DST): UTC+4:30 (IRDT)

Sar Tavus (Persian: سرطاووس, also Romanized as Sar Ţāvūs) is a village in Tabadkan Rural District, in the Central District of Mashhad County, Razavi Khorasan Province, Iran. At the 2006 census, its population was 12, in 4 families.
