= Esfandian =

Esfandian اسفنديان
- Village
- Location within Iran
- Coordinates: 36°28′28″N 59°31′37″E
- Country: Iran
- Province: Razavi Khorasan
- County: Mashhad
- Bakhsh: Central
- Rural District: Tus

Population (2006)
  - Total: 225
- Time zone: UTC+3:30 (IRST)
  - Summer (DST): UTC+4:30 (IRDT)

Esfandian (Persian: اسفنديان, also Romanized as Esfandīān and Esfandeyān) is a village in Tus Rural District, in the Central District of Mashhad County, Razavi Khorasan Province, Iran. At the 2006 census, its population was 225, in 57 families.
