= Chelqi =

Chelqi چلقي
- Village
- Location within Iran
- Coordinates: 36°13′00″N 59°53′48″E
- Country: Iran
- Province: Razavi Khorasan
- County: Mashhad
- Bakhsh: Razaviyeh
- Rural District: Meyami

Population (2006)
  - Total: 631
- Time zone: UTC+3:30 (IRST)
  - Summer (DST): UTC+4:30 (IRDT)

Chelqi (Persian: چلقي, also Romanized as Chelqī, Chelghī, Cholāqī, and Chollāqi) is a village in Meyami Rural District, Razaviyeh District, Mashhad County, Razavi Khorasan Province, Iran. At the 2006 census, its population was 631, in 131 families.
