= Shah Taqi =

Shah Taqi شاه تقي
- Village
- Location within Iran
- Coordinates: 36°34′25″N 59°30′42″E
- Country: Iran
- Province: Razavi Khorasan
- County: Mashhad
- Bakhsh: Central
- Rural District: Darzab

Population (2006)
  - Total: 241
- Time zone: UTC+3:30 (IRST)
  - Summer (DST): UTC+4:30 (IRDT)

Shah Taqi (Persian: شاه تقي, also romanized as Shāh Taqī; also known as Shāh Ţaqā and Emām Taqī) is a village in Darzab Rural District, located in the Central District of Mashhad County, Razavi Khorasan Province, Iran. At the 2006 census, its population was 241, and had 60 families.
