= Parkandabad =

Parkandabad پركنداباد
- Village
- Location within Iran
- Coordinates: 36°24′11″N 59°33′20″E
- Country: Iran
- Province: Razavi Khorasan
- County: Mashhad
- Bakhsh: Central
- Rural District: Tus

Population (2006)
  - Total: 268
- Time zone: UTC+3:30 (IRST)
  - Summer (DST): UTC+4:30 (IRDT)

Parkandabad (Persian: پركنداباد, also Romanized as Parkandābād; also known as Parkandehābād and Perkanābād) is a village in Tus Rural District, in the Central District of Mashhad County, Razavi Khorasan Province, Iran. At the 2006 census, its population was 268, in 66 families.
