= Kalateh-ye Seyyed Sadeq =

Kalateh-ye Seyyed Sadeq كلاته سيدصادق
- Village
- Location within Iran
- Coordinates: 36°17′00″N 59°45′43″E
- Country: Iran
- Province: Razavi Khorasan
- County: Mashhad
- Bakhsh: Central
- Rural District: Kenevist

Population (2006)
  - Total: 23
- Time zone: UTC+3:30 (IRST)
  - Summer (DST): UTC+4:30 (IRDT)

Kalateh-ye Seyyed Sadeq (Persian: كلاته سيدصادق, also Romanized as Kalāteh-ye Seyyed Sādeq) is a village in Kenevist Rural District, in the Central District of Mashhad County, Razavi Khorasan Province, Iran. At the 2006 census, its population was 23, in 8 families.
