= Shurak-e Saburi =

Shurak-e Saburi شورك صبوري
- Village
- Location within Iran
- Coordinates: 36°05′07″N 60°03′42″E
- Country: Iran
- Province: Razavi Khorasan
- County: Mashhad
- Bakhsh: Razaviyeh
- Rural District: Abravan

Population (2006)
  - Total: 649
- Time zone: UTC+3:30 (IRST)
  - Summer (DST): UTC+4:30 (IRDT)

Shurak-e Saburi (Persian: شورك صبوري, also Romanized as Shūrak-e Sabūrī; also known as Shūrak-e Afghānhā) is a village in Abravan Rural District, Razaviyeh District, Mashhad County, Razavi Khorasan Province, Iran. At the 2006 census, its population was 649, in 123 families.
