= Hajj Kazemi =

Hajj Kazemi حاج كاظمي
- Village
- Country: Iran
- Province: Razavi Khorasan
- County: Nishapur
- Bakhsh: Central
- Rural District: Fazl

Population (2006)
  - Total: 26
- Time zone: UTC+3:30 (IRST)
  - Summer (DST): UTC+4:30 (IRDT)

Hajj Kazemi (Persian: حاج كاظمي, also Romanized as Ḩājj Kāẓemī) is a village in Fazl Rural District, in the Central District of Nishapur County, Razavi Khorasan Province, Iran. At the 2006 census, its population was 26, in 8 families.
