= Boshruy =

Boshruy بشروي
- Village
- Location within Iran
- Coordinates: 36°08′08″N 58°53′11″E
- Country: Iran
- Province: Razavi Khorasan
- County: Nishapur
- Bakhsh: Central
- Rural District: Darbqazi

Population (2006)
  - Total: 360
- Time zone: UTC+3:30 (IRST)
  - Summer (DST): UTC+4:30 (IRDT)

Boshruy (Persian: بشروي, also Romanized as Boshrūy) is a village in Darbqazi Rural District, in the Central District of Nishapur County, Razavi Khorasan Province, Iran. At the 2006 census, its population was 360, in 93 families.
