= Larhang =

Larhang لارهنگ
- Village
- Location within Iran
- Coordinates: 35°52′05″N 57°28′44″E
- Country: Iran
- Province: Razavi Khorasan
- County: Sabzevar
- Bakhsh: Rud Ab
- Rural District: Khavashod

Population (2006)
  - Total: 90
- Time zone: UTC+3:30 (IRST)
  - Summer (DST): UTC+4:30 (IRDT)

Larhang (Persian: لارهنگ, also Romanized as Lārhang; also known as Lārmang) is a village in Khavashod Rural District, Rud Ab District, Sabzevar County, Razavi Khorasan Province, Iran. At the 2006 census, its population was 90, in 23 families.
