= Buteh Mordeh =

Buteh Mordeh بوته مرده
- Village
- Location within Iran
- Coordinates: 35°52′39″N 60°18′56″E
- Country: Iran
- Province: Razavi Khorasan
- County: Mashhad
- Bakhsh: Razaviyeh
- Rural District: Pain Velayat

Population (2006)
  - Total: 66
- Time zone: UTC+3:30 (IRST)
  - Summer (DST): UTC+4:30 (IRDT)

Buteh Mordeh (Persian: بوته مرده, also Romanized as Būteh Mordeh; also known as Bauta Māurdeh, Boteh Mordeh-ye Bālā, Boteh Mordeh-ye ‘Olyā, Būtā Mā’ūrdeh, and Bābānaẓar) is a village in Pain Velayat Rural District, Razaviyeh District, Mashhad County, Razavi Khorasan Province, Iran. At the 2006 census, its population was 66, in 20 families.
