= Gazargan =

Gazargan گازرگان
- Village
- Location within Iran
- Coordinates: 36°29′57″N 59°39′35″E
- Country: Iran
- Province: Razavi Khorasan
- County: Mashhad
- Bakhsh: Central
- Rural District: Tabadkan

Population (2006)
  - Total: 43
- Time zone: UTC+3:30 (IRST)
  - Summer (DST): UTC+4:30 (IRDT)

Gazargan (Persian: گازرگان, also Romanized as Gāzargān; also known as Gāzargāh) is a village in Tabadkan Rural District, in the Central District of Mashhad County, Razavi Khorasan Province, Iran. At the 2006 census, its population was 43, in 13 families.
