= Sanguni =

Sanguni سنگوني
- Village
- Location within Iran
- Coordinates: 36°14′00″N 58°44′59″E
- Country: Iran
- Province: Razavi Khorasan
- County: Nishapur
- Bakhsh: Central
- Rural District: Mazul

Population (2006)
  - Total: 219
- Time zone: UTC+3:30 (IRST)
  - Summer (DST): UTC+4:30 (IRDT)

Sanguni (Persian: سنگوني, also Romanized as Sangūnī) is a village in Mazul Rural District, in the Central District of Nishapur County, Razavi Khorasan Province, Iran. At the 2006 census, its population was 219, in 59 families.
