= Cheshmeh Sir =

Cheshmeh Sir چشمه سير
- Village
- Location within Iran
- Coordinates: 36°13′56″N 58°05′45″E
- Country: Iran
- Province: Razavi Khorasan
- County: Sabzevar
- Bakhsh: Central
- Rural District: Robat

Population (2006)
  - Total: 113
- Time zone: UTC+3:30 (IRST)
  - Summer (DST): UTC+4:30 (IRDT)

Cheshmeh Sir (Persian: چشمه سير, also Romanized as Cheshmeh Sīr) is a village in Robat Rural District, in the Central District of Sabzevar County, Razavi Khorasan Province, Iran. At the 2006 census, its population was 113, in 33 families.
