= Seh Chub =

Seh Chub سه چوب
- Village
- Location within Iran
- Coordinates: 36°14′05″N 58°45′13″E
- Country: Iran
- Province: Razavi Khorasan
- County: Nishapur
- Bakhsh: Central
- Rural District: Mazul

Population (2006)
  - Total: 259
- Time zone: UTC+3:30 (IRST)
  - Summer (DST): UTC+4:30 (IRDT)

Seh Chub (Persian: سه چوب, also Romanized as Seh Chūb) is a village in Mazul Rural District, in the Central District of Nishapur County, Razavi Khorasan Province, Iran. At the 2006 census, its population was 259, in 72 families.
