= Kalateh-ye Feyzabad =

Kalateh-ye Feyzabad كلاته فيض اباد
- Village
- Country: Iran
- Province: Razavi Khorasan
- County: Mashhad
- Bakhsh: Central
- Rural District: Kenevist

Population (2006)
  - Total: 295
- Time zone: UTC+3:30 (IRST)
  - Summer (DST): UTC+4:30 (IRDT)

Kalateh-ye Feyzabad (Persian: كلاته فيض اباد, also Romanized as Kalāteh-ye Feyz̤ābād) is a village in Kenevist Rural District, in the Central District of Mashhad County, Razavi Khorasan Province, Iran. At the 2006 census, its population was 295, in 52 families.
