= Sarish =

Sarish سريش
- Village
- Location within Iran
- Coordinates: 35°50′31″N 57°36′07″E
- Country: Iran
- Province: Razavi Khorasan
- County: Sabzevar
- Bakhsh: Rud Ab
- Rural District: Khavashod

Population (2006)
  - Total: 207
- Time zone: UTC+3:30 (IRST)
  - Summer (DST): UTC+4:30 (IRDT)

Sarish (Persian: سريش, also Romanized as Sarīsh) is a village in Khavashod Rural District, Rud Ab District, Sabzevar County, Razavi Khorasan Province, Iran. At the 2006 census, its population was 207, in 77 families.
