= Kalateh-ye Qalichi =

Kalateh-ye Qalichi كلاته قليچي
- Village
- Country: Iran
- Province: Razavi Khorasan
- County: Sabzevar
- Bakhsh: Central
- Rural District: Qasabeh-ye Gharbi

Population (2006)
  - Total: 14
- Time zone: UTC+3:30 (IRST)
  - Summer (DST): UTC+4:30 (IRDT)

Kalateh-ye Qalichi (Persian: كلاته قليچي, also Romanized as Kalāteh-ye Qalīchī) is a village in Qasabeh-ye Gharbi Rural District, in the Central District of Sabzevar County, Razavi Khorasan Province, Iran. At the 2006 census, its population was 14, in 4 families.
