= Hasan Khordu =

Hasan Khordu حسن خردو
- Village
- Location within Iran
- Coordinates: 36°26′52″N 59°28′45″E
- Country: Iran
- Province: Razavi Khorasan
- County: Mashhad
- Bakhsh: Central
- Rural District: Tus

Population (2006)
  - Total: 233
- Time zone: UTC+3:30 (IRST)
  - Summer (DST): UTC+4:30 (IRDT)

Hasan Khordu (Persian: حسن خردو, also Romanized as Ḩasan Khordū; also known as Shahīd Shaʿbānī) is a village in Tus Rural District, in the Central District of Mashhad County, Razavi Khorasan Province, Iran. At the 2006 census, its population was 233, in 61 families.

== History of the Khordu Family ==
The Khordou family is one of Russian descent and is considered one of the richest Russian families who fled to Iran in 1879 due to opposition to the Russian government and rebellion.

Hasan Khordu is located in the region of Razavi Khorasan in Iran.
