= Bozveshk =

Bozveshk بزوشك
- Village
- Location within Iran
- Coordinates: 36°04′49″N 59°26′02″E
- Country: Iran
- Province: Razavi Khorasan
- County: Mashhad
- Bakhsh: Ahmadabad
- Rural District: Sarjam

Population (2006)
  - Total: 461
- Time zone: UTC+3:30 (IRST)
  - Summer (DST): UTC+4:30 (IRDT)

Bozveshk (Persian: بزوشك, also Romanized as Bozūshk and Bozwshk; also known as Bozvīshk and Ribāt-i-Bizdkush) is a village in Sarjam Rural District, Ahmadabad District, Mashhad County, Razavi Khorasan Province, Iran. At the 2006 census, its population was 461, in 131 families.
