= Cheshmeh-e Alimva =

Cheshmeh-e Alimva چشمه عليمو
- Village
- Location within Iran
- Coordinates: 36°32′25″N 59°28′11″E
- Country: Iran
- Province: Razavi Khorasan
- County: Mashhad
- Bakhsh: Central
- Rural District: Darzab

Population (2006)
  - Total: 51
- Time zone: UTC+3:30 (IRST)
  - Summer (DST): UTC+4:30 (IRDT)

Cheshmeh-e Alimva (Persian: چشمه عليمو, also Romanized as Cheshmeh-e 'Alīmva; also known as Cheshmeh 'Alīvān and Cheshmeh-e 'Alīvān) is a village in Darzab Rural District, in the Central District of Mashhad County, Razavi Khorasan province, Iran. At the 2006 census, its population was 51, in 14 families.
