= Giami =

Giami گيامي
- Village
- Location within Iran
- Coordinates: 35°51′15″N 60°05′21″E
- Country: Iran
- Province: Razavi Khorasan
- County: Mashhad
- Bakhsh: Razaviyeh
- Rural District: Abravan

Population (2006)
  - Total: 450
- Time zone: UTC+3:30 (IRST)
  - Summer (DST): UTC+4:30 (IRDT)

Giami (Persian: گيامي, also Romanized as Gīāmī, Geyāmey, and Gīyāmī; also known as Kīāmey) is a village in Abravan Rural District, Razaviyeh District, Mashhad County, Razavi Khorasan Province, Iran. At the 2006 census, its population was 450, in 115 families.
