= Khanshah =

Khanshah خانشاه
- Village
- Location within Iran
- Coordinates: 36°06′17″N 58°53′31″E
- Country: Iran
- Province: Razavi Khorasan
- County: Nishapur
- Bakhsh: Central
- Rural District: Darbqazi

Population (2006)
  - Total: 15
- Time zone: UTC+3:30 (IRST)
  - Summer (DST): UTC+4:30 (IRDT)

Khanshah (Persian: خانشاه, also Romanized as Khānshāh; also known as Khūnshā) is a village in Darbqazi Rural District, in the Central District of Nishapur County, Razavi Khorasan Province, Iran. At the 2006 census, its population was 15, in 5 families.
