= Qaruneh =

Qaorouneh قرونه
- Village
- Location within Iran
- Coordinates: 36°32′46″N 58°41′50″E
- Country: Iran
- Province: Razavi Khorasan
- County: Nishapur
- Bakhsh: Central
- Rural District: Binalud

Population (2006)
  - Total: 234
- Time zone: UTC+3:30 (IRST)
  - Summer (DST): UTC+4:30 (IRDT)

Qorouneh (Persian: قرونه, also Romanized as Qarūneh) is a village in Binalud Rural District, in the Central District of Nishapur County, Razavi Khorasan Province, Iran. At the 2006 census, its population was 234, in 51 families.
