= Jalandeh =

Jalandeh جالنده
- Village
- Location within Iran
- Coordinates: 36°07′32″N 58°47′50″E
- Country: Iran
- Province: Razavi Khorasan
- County: Nishapur
- Bakhsh: Central
- Rural District: Darbqazi

Population (2006)
  - Total: 61
- Time zone: UTC+3:30 (IRST)
  - Summer (DST): UTC+4:30 (IRDT)

Jalandeh (Persian: جالنده, also Romanized as Jālandeh) is a village in Darbqazi Rural District, in the Central District of Nishapur County, Razavi Khorasan Province, Iran. At the 2006 census, its population was 61, in 16 families.
