= Derakht-e Sefidar =

Derakht-e Sefidar درخت سفيدار
- Village
- Location within Iran
- Coordinates: 36°00′30″N 59°22′37″E
- Country: Iran
- Province: Razavi Khorasan
- County: Mashhad
- Bakhsh: Ahmadabad
- Rural District: Piveh Zhan

Population (2006)
  - Total: 134
- Time zone: UTC+3:30 (IRST)
  - Summer (DST): UTC+4:30 (IRDT)

Derakht-e Sefidar (Persian: درخت سفيدار, also Romanized as Derakht-e Sefīdār; also known as Sefīd Dāl) is a village in Piveh Zhan Rural District, Ahmadabad District, Mashhad County, Razavi Khorasan Province, Iran. At the 2006 census, its population was 134, in 39 families.
