= Loqmani =

Loqmani لقماني
- Village
- Location within Iran
- Coordinates: 36°26′48″N 59°32′10″E
- Country: Iran
- Province: Razavi Khorasan
- County: Mashhad
- Bakhsh: Central
- Rural District: Tus

Population (2006)
  - Total: 288
- Time zone: UTC+3:30 (IRST)
  - Summer (DST): UTC+4:30 (IRDT)

Loqmani (Persian: لقماني, also Romanized as Loqmānī) is a village in Tus Rural District, in the Central District of Mashhad County, Razavi Khorasan Province, Iran. At the 2006 census, its population was 288, in 60 families.
