= Kariz =

Kariz or Kahriz may refer to:

- Turpan water system

== Places in Afghanistan ==
- Kariz, Bamyan
- Kariz, Faryab
- Kariz, Kandahar
- Kariz, Vardak 34°28′N 67°0′E
- Kariz, Vardak 34°12′N 68°25′E
- Kariz, Zabol 31°45′42″N 66°22′54″E
- Kariz, Zabol 31°58′5″N 67°5′51″E

== Places in Iran ==
=== Ardabil Province ===
- Kahriz, Ardabil, a village in Nir County

=== East Azerbaijan Province ===
- Kahriz, East Azerbaijan, a village in Meyaneh County

=== Hamadan Province ===
- Kahriz, Hamadan, a village in Malayer County
- Kahriz, Kabudarahang, a village in Kabudarahang County
- Kahriz, alternate name of Kahriz-e Hoseynabad-e Nazem, a village in Malayer County
- Kahriz, alternate name of Kahriz-e Salah ol Din, a village in Nahavand County
- Kahriz, alternate name of Kahriz-e Salim, a village in Nahavand County

=== Isfahan Province ===
- Kariz, Isfahan, a village in Lenjan County
- Kariz Rural District, an administrative division of Lenjan County

=== Kermanshah Province ===
- Kahriz-e Olya, Harsin, a village in Harsin County
- Kahriz-e Bid Sorkh, a village in Kangavar County
- Kahriz-e Kalan, a village in Kangavar County
- Kahriz, Poshtdarband, a village in Kermanshah County
- Kahriz, Qarah Su, a village in Kermanshah County
- Kahriz-e Kur Bolagh, a village in Kermanshah County
- Kahriz-e Qaleh Kohneh, a village in Kermanshah County
- Kahriz-e Sofla, a village in Kermanshah County
- Kahriz, Sahneh, a village in Sahneh County
- Kahriz, Sonqor, a village in Sonqor County

=== Khuzestan Province ===
- Kahriz, Khuzestan, a village in Izeh County

=== Kurdistan Province ===
- Kahriz, Kurdistan, a village in Bijar County

=== Lorestan Province ===
- Kahriz, Azna, a village in Azna County, Lorestan Province
- Kahriz, Borujerd, a village in Borujerd County, Lorestan Province
- Kahriz, Khorramabad, a village in Khorramabad County, Lorestan Province
- Kahriz, Selseleh, a village in Selseleh County, Lorestan Province
- Kahriz Gizhian, a village in Kuhdasht County, Lorestan Province
- Kahriz-e Jadid, a village in Khorramabad County, Lorestan Province
- Kahriz-e Sefid, a village in Azna County, Lorestan Province
- Kahriz-e Varvasht, a village in Delfan County, Lorestan Province

=== North Khorasan Province ===
- Kariz, Bojnord, a village in Bojnord County, North Khorasan Province
- Kariz, Maneh and Samalqan, a village in Maneh and Samalqan County, North Khorasan Province

=== Razavi Khorasan Province ===
- Kariz-e Bedaq, a village in Fariman County
- Kariz-e Diklan, a village in Fariman County
- Kariz-e Hajj Mohammad Jan, a village in Fariman County
- Kariz Sukhteh-ye Dowlatabad, a village in Fariman County
- Kariz, Kashmar, a village in Kashmar County
- Kariz-e Sabah, a village in Nishapur County
- Kariz, Razavi Khorasan, a city in Taybad County
- Kariz-e Omar, a village in Torbat-e Jam County
- Kariz Darreh, a village in Torbat-e Jam County
- Kariz Divaneh, a village in Torbat-e Jam County
- Kariz Kohandel, a village in Torbat-e Jam County
- Kariz-e Bala, a village in Zaveh County
- Kariz-e Geli, a village in Zaveh County

=== Semnan Province ===
- Kariz, Semnan, a village in Shahrud County

=== West Azerbaijan Province ===
- Kahriz, Chaypareh, a village in Chaypareh County
- Kahriz-e Qaleh Daresi, a village in Maku County
- Kahriz-e Ajam, a village in Naqadeh County
- Kahriz, Salmas, a village in Salmas County
- Kahriz, Shahin Dezh, a village in Shahin Dezh County
- Kahriz, Urmia, a village in Urmia County

=== Yazd Province ===
- Kariz-e Bala, Yazd, a village in Taft County
- Kariz-e Pain, a village in Taft County

=== Zanjan Province ===
- Kahriz, Ijrud, a village in Ijrud County
- Kahriz, Mahneshan, a village in Mahneshan County
- Kahriz, Zanjan, a village in Khodabandeh County

=== other ===
- Kariz-e Now (disambiguation)

== See also ==
- Karie (disambiguation)
