= Kamalvand =

Kamalvand may refer to:

- Arash Kamalvand (born 1989), Iranian volleyball player
- Faraz Kamalvand (born 1977), Iranian football coach
- Kamalvand, Hamadan, a village in Hamadan Province, Iran
- Kamalvand, Khuzestan, a village in Khuzestan Province, Iran
- Chaleh-ye Kamalvand, a village in Lorestan Province, Iran
- Kamalvand-e Gholam Ali, a village in Lorestan Province, Iran
- Kamalvand-e Iman Ali, a village in Lorestan Province, Iran
- Kamalvand-e Mohammad Hoseyn Parvaneh, a village in Lorestan Province, Iran
