= Pa Qaleh =

Pa Qaleh or Paqaleh (Persian: پاقلعه) may refer to:

- Pa Qaleh, Fars
- Pa Qaleh, Golestan
- Pa Qaleh, Ilam
- Pa Qaleh, Sarduiyeh, Jiroft County, Kerman Province
- Pa Qaleh, Shahr-e Babak, Kerman Province
- Pa Qaleh, Kermanshah
- Pa Qaleh-ye Khoskheh Rud, Kermanshah Province
- Pa Qaleh, Lorestan
- Pa Qaleh, North Khorasan
- Pa Qaleh, Razavi Khorasan
- Pa Qaleh, Semnan
- Pa Qaleh, West Azerbaijan
- Pa Qaleh Rural District, in Kerman Province
