= Dalaneh =

Village in Razavi Khorasan province, Iran

Dalaneh Persian: دالانه
- Village
- Location within Iran
- Coordinates: 35°05′48″N 59°58′10″E
- Country: Iran
- Province: Razavi Khorasan
- County: Zaveh
- District: Soleyman
- Rural District: Saq

Population (2016)
  - Total: Below reporting threshold
- Time zone: UTC+3:30 (IRST)

Dalaneh (Persian: دالانه) (Note: Also romanized as Dālāneh; also known as Dowlāneh) is a village in Saq Rural District of Soleyman District in Zaveh County, Razavi Khorasan province, Iran.

== Demographics ==
=== Population ===
At the time of the 2006 National Census, the village's population was 19 in five households, when it was in Soleyman Rural District of the former Jolgeh Zaveh District in Torbat-e Heydarieh County. The following census in 2011 counted a population below the reporting threshold, by which time the district had been separated from the county in the establishment of Zaveh County. The rural district was transferred to the new Soleyman District, and Dalaneh was transferred to Saq Rural District created in the same district. The 2016 census measured the population of the village as once again below the reporting threshold.
