= Kahijeh =

Village in Razavi Khorasan province, Iran

Kahijeh Persian: كاهيجه
- Village
- Location within Iran
- Coordinates: 35°08′31″N 59°47′13″E
- Country: Iran
- Province: Razavi Khorasan
- County: Zaveh
- District: Soleyman
- Rural District: Saq

Population (2016)
  - Total: 2,981
- Time zone: UTC+3:30 (IRST)

Kahijeh (Persian: كاهيجه) (Note: Also romanized as Kāhījeh) is a village in Saq Rural District of Soleyman District in Zaveh County, Razavi Khorasan province, Iran.

== Demographics ==
=== Population ===
At the time of the 2006 National Census, the village's population was 2,497 in 528 households, when it was in Soleyman Rural District of the former Jolgeh Zaveh District in Torbat-e Heydarieh County. The following census in 2011 counted 2,864 people in 717 households, by which time the district had been separated from the county in the establishment of Zaveh County. The rural district was transferred to the new Soleyman District, and Kahijeh was transferred to Saq Rural District created in the same district. The 2016 census measured the population of the village as 2,981 people in 750 households.
