= Kalateh-ye Khan =

Kalateh-ye Khan or Kalateh Khan (Persian: كلاته خان) may refer to:

- Amirabad-e Pain (disambiguation)
- Ebrahimabad, Ferdows
- Kalateh-ye Khan, Nehbandan
- Kalateh-ye Khan, Qaen
- Kalateh-ye Khan, Razavi Khorasan
- Kalateh-ye Khan, Semnan
- Rahmatabad, Gonabad
- Kalateh-ye Hamid
