= Bidvey =

Village in Razavi Khorasan province, Iran

Bidvey Persian: بيدوي
- Village
- Location within Iran
- Coordinates: 35°04′49″N 59°58′38″E
- Country: Iran
- Province: Razavi Khorasan
- County: Zaveh
- District: Soleyman
- Rural District: Saq

Population (2016)
  - Total: 1,263
- Time zone: UTC+3:30 (IRST)

Bidvey (Persian: بيدوي) (Note: Also romanized as Bīdvey) is a village in Saq Rural District of Soleyman District in Zaveh County, Razavi Khorasan province, Iran.

== Demographics ==
=== Population ===
At the time of the 2006 National Census, the village's population was 1,079 in 251 households, when it was in Soleyman Rural District of the former Jolgeh Zaveh District in Torbat-e Heydarieh County. The following census in 2011 counted 1,286 people in 359 households, by which time the district had been separated from the county in the establishment of Zaveh County. The rural district was transferred to the new Soleyman District, and Bidvey was transferred to Saq Rural District created in the same district. The 2016 census measured the population of the village as 1,263 people in 364 households.
