= Kashkak, Razavi Khorasan =

Village in Razavi Khorasan province, Iran

Kashkak Persian: كشكك
- Village
- Location within Iran
- Coordinates: 35°06′39″N 60°00′57″E
- Country: Iran
- Province: Razavi Khorasan
- County: Zaveh
- District: Soleyman
- Rural District: Saq

Population (2016)
  - Total: 1,414
- Time zone: UTC+3:30 (IRST)

Kashkak (Persian: كشكك) (Note: Also known as Kūshkak) is a village in Saq Rural District of Soleyman District in Zaveh County, Razavi Khorasan province, Iran.

== Demographics ==
=== Population ===
At the time of the 2006 National Census, the village's population was 1,408 in 303 households, when it was in Soleyman Rural District of the former Jolgeh Zaveh District in Torbat-e Heydarieh County. The following census in 2011 counted 1,569 people in 400 households, by which time the district had been separated from the county in the establishment of Zaveh County. The rural district was transferred to the new Soleyman District, and Kashkak was transferred to Saq Rural District created in the same district. The 2016 census measured the population of the village as 1,414 people in 403 households.
