= Qaleh-ye Aqa Hasan =

Village in Razavi Khorasan province, Iran

Qaleh-ye Aqa Hasan Persian: قلعه اقاحسن
- Village
- Location within Iran
- Coordinates: 35°08′33″N 59°53′53″E
- Country: Iran
- Province: Razavi Khorasan
- County: Zaveh
- District: Soleyman
- Rural District: Saq

Population (2016)
  - Total: 3,499
- Time zone: UTC+3:30 (IRST)

Qaleh-ye Aqa Hasan (Persian: قلعه اقاحسن) (Note: Also romanized as Qal‘eh Āqa Ḩasan, Qal’eh-e-Āqā Hasan, and Qal‘eh-ye Āqā Ḩasān; also known as Āqā Ḩasan) is a village in, and the capital of, Saq Rural District in Soleyman District of Zaveh County, Razavi Khorasan province, Iran.

== Demographics ==
=== Population ===
At the time of the 2006 National Census, the village's population was 3,183 in 748 households, when it was in Soleyman Rural District of the former Jolgeh Zaveh District in Torbat-e Heydarieh County. The following census in 2011 counted 3,261 people in 916 households, by which time the district had been separated from the county in the establishment of Zaveh County. The rural district was transferred to the new Soleyman District, and Qaleh-ye Aqa Hasan was transferred to Saq Rural District created in the same district. The 2016 census measured the population of the village as 3,499 people in 1,064 households.
