= Chaqeh-ye Baluchha =

Chaqeh-ye Baluchha چاقه بلوچها
- Village
- Location within Iran
- Coordinates: 35°23′50″N 59°38′26″E
- Country: Iran
- Province: Razavi Khorasan
- County: Zaveh
- Bakhsh: Central
- Rural District: Safaiyeh

Population (2006)
  - Total: 285
- Time zone: UTC+3:30 (IRST)
  - Summer (DST): UTC+4:30 (IRDT)

Chaqeh-ye Baluchha (Persian: چاقه بلوچها, also Romanized as Chāqeh-ye Balūchhā; also known as Chāgheh-ye Balūchhā and Chāqeh) is a village in Safaiyeh Rural District, in the Central District of Zaveh County, Razavi Khorasan Province, Iran. At the 2006 census, its population was 285, in 57 families.
