= Kang-e Sofla =

Kang-e Sofla كنگ سفلي
- Village
- Location within Iran
- Coordinates: 35°17′05″N 59°26′11″E
- Country: Iran
- Province: Razavi Khorasan
- County: Zaveh
- Bakhsh: Central
- Rural District: Zaveh

Population (2006)
  - Total: 763
- Time zone: UTC+3:30 (IRST)
  - Summer (DST): UTC+4:30 (IRDT)

Kang-e Sofla (Persian: كنگ سفلي, also Romanized as Kang-e Soflá and Kang Sofla; also known as Kang-e Pā’īn) is a village in Zaveh Rural District, in the Central District of Zaveh County, Razavi Khorasan Province, Iran. At the 2006 census, its population was 763, in 214 families.
