= Golsara =

Village in Razavi Khorasan province, Iran

Golsara Persian: گلسرا
- Village
- Location within Iran
- Coordinates: 35°22′17″N 59°30′55″E
- Country: Iran
- Province: Razavi Khorasan
- County: Zaveh
- District: Central
- Rural District: Zaveh

Population (2016)
  - Total: 1,354
- Time zone: UTC+3:30 (IRST)

Golsara (Persian: گلسرا) (Note: Also romanized as Golsarā; also known as Gīlzārā’ī, Gol Sarā’ī, and Gul Sarāi) is a village in Zaveh Rural District of the Central District in Zaveh County, Razavi Khorasan province, Iran.

== Demographics ==
=== Population ===
At the time of the 2006 National Census, the village's population was 1,153 in 270 households, when it was in the former Jolgeh Zaveh District of Torbat-e Heydarieh County. The following census in 2011 counted 1,064 people in 309 households, by which time the district had been separated from the county in the establishment of Zaveh County. The rural district was transferred to the new Central District. The 2016 census measured the population of the village as 1,354 people in 391 households.
