= Kang-e Zeytun =

Kang-e Zeytun كنگزيتون
- Village
- Location within Iran
- Coordinates: 35°17′13″N 59°26′50″E
- Country: Iran
- Province: Razavi Khorasan
- County: Zaveh
- Bakhsh: Central
- Rural District: Zaveh

Population (2006)
  - Total: 76
- Time zone: UTC+3:30 (IRST)
  - Summer (DST): UTC+4:30 (IRDT)

Kang-e Zeytun (Persian: كنگزيتون, also Romanized as Kang-e Zeytūn) is a village in Zaveh Rural District, in the Central District of Zaveh County, Razavi Khorasan Province, Iran. At the 2006 census, its population was 76, in 29 families.
