= Mirpasand =

Mirpasand ميرپسند
- Village
- Location within Iran
- Coordinates: 35°21′01″N 59°49′03″E
- Country: Iran
- Province: Razavi Khorasan
- County: Zaveh
- Bakhsh: Soleyman
- Rural District: Soleyman

Population (2006)
  - Total: 522
- Time zone: UTC+3:30 (IRST)
  - Summer (DST): UTC+4:30 (IRDT)

Mirpasand (Persian: ميرپسند, also Romanized as Mīrpasand; also known as Shāhsavan (Persian: شاهسون), Shāhsavand (Persian: شاهسوند), and Shāhsūn) is a village in Soleyman Rural District, Soleyman District, Zaveh County, Razavi Khorasan Province, Iran. At the 2006 census, its population was 522, in 109 families.
