= Shahnabad, Razavi Khorasan =

Village in Razavi Khorasan province, Iran

Shahnabad Persian: شهن اباد
- Village
- Location within Iran
- Coordinates: 35°18′18″N 59°25′49″E
- Country: Iran
- Province: Razavi Khorasan
- County: Zaveh
- District: Central
- Rural District: Zaveh

Population (2016)
  - Total: 1,430
- Time zone: UTC+3:30 (IRST)

Shahnabad (Persian: شهن اباد) (Note: Also romanized as Shahnābād) is a village in Zaveh Rural District of the Central District in Zaveh County, Razavi Khorasan province, Iran.

== Demographics ==
=== Population ===
At the time of the 2006 National Census, the village's population was 1,935 in 463 households, when it was in the former Jolgeh Zaveh District of Torbat-e Heydarieh County. The following census in 2011 counted 1,857 people in 546 households, by which time the district had been separated from the county in the establishment of Zaveh County. The rural district was transferred to the new Central District. The 2016 census measured the population of the village as 1,430 people in 408 households.
