= Kahrizak (disambiguation) =

Kahrizak is a city in Rey County, Tehran Province, Iran.

Kahrizak (Persian: كهريزك) may also refer to:

- Kahrizak, Alborz, a village in Savojbolagh County, Alborz Province, Iran
- Kahrizak, Fars, a village in Bavanat County, Fars Province, Iran
- Kahrizak, Razavi Khorasan, a village in Zaveh County, Razavi Khorasan Province, Iran
- Kahrizak, Malard, a village in Malard County, Tehran Province, Iran
- Kahrizak, Pakdasht, a village in Pakdasht County, Tehran Province, Iran
- Kahrizak-e Burbur, a village in Varamin County, Tehran Province, Iran
- Kahrizak District, an administrative subdivision of Rey County, Tehran Province, Iran
- Kahrizak Rural District, an administrative subdivision of Rey County, Tehran Province, Iran
- Kahrizak detention center, a prison

== See also ==
- Karizak (disambiguation)
