= Esmailabad, Zaveh =

Esmailabad اسماعيل اباد
- Village
- Location within Iran
- Coordinates: 35°17′22″N 59°20′27″E
- Country: Iran
- Province: Razavi Khorasan
- County: Zaveh
- Bakhsh: Central
- Rural District: Zaveh

Population (2006)
  - Total: 244
- Time zone: UTC+3:30 (IRST)
  - Summer (DST): UTC+4:30 (IRDT)

Esmailabad (Persian: اسماعيل اباد, also Romanized as Esmā‘īlābād) is a village in Zaveh Rural District, in the Central District of Zaveh County, Razavi Khorasan Province, Iran. At the 2006 census, its population was 244, in 64 families.
