= Shahvar =

Village in Razavi Khorasan province, Iran

Shahvar Persian: شهوار
- Village
- Location within Iran
- Coordinates: 35°13′09″N 59°43′26″E
- Country: Iran
- Province: Razavi Khorasan
- County: Zaveh
- District: Soleyman
- Rural District: Soleyman

Population (2016)
  - Total: 969
- Time zone: UTC+3:30 (IRST)

Shahvar (Persian: شهوار) (Note: Also romanized as Shahvār) is a village in Soleyman Rural District of Soleyman District in Zaveh County, Razavi Khorasan province, Iran.

== Demographics ==
=== Population ===
At the time of the 2006 National Census, the village's population was 1,144 in 241 households, when it was in the former Jolgeh Zaveh District of Torbat-e Heydarieh County. The following census in 2011 counted 1,279 people in 340 households, by which time the district had been separated from the county in the establishment of Zaveh County. The rural district was transferred to the new Soleyman District. The 2016 census measured the population of the village as 969 people in 261 households.
