= Kang-e Olya =

Kang-e Olya كنگ عليا
- Village
- Location within Iran
- Coordinates: 35°17′53″N 59°26′34″E
- Country: Iran
- Province: Razavi Khorasan
- County: Zaveh
- Bakhsh: Central
- Rural District: Zaveh

Population (2006)
  - Total: 592
- Time zone: UTC+3:30 (IRST)
  - Summer (DST): UTC+4:30 (IRDT)

Kang-e Olya (Persian: كنگ عليا, also Romanized as Kang-e ‘Olyā and Kang Olya; also known as Kang and Kang-e Bālā) is a village in Zaveh Rural District, in the Central District of Zaveh County, Razavi Khorasan Province, Iran. At the 2006 census, its population was 592, with 140 families.
