= Siah Sang, Zaveh =

Siah Sang سياه سنگ
- Village
- Location within Iran
- Coordinates: 35°15′16″N 59°25′08″E
- Country: Iran
- Province: Razavi Khorasan
- County: Zaveh
- Bakhsh: Central
- Rural District: Zaveh

Population (2006)
  - Total: 396
- Time zone: UTC+3:30 (IRST)
  - Summer (DST): UTC+4:30 (IRDT)

Siah Sang (Persian: سياه سنگ, also Romanized as Sīāh Sang) is a village in Zaveh Rural District, in the Central District of Zaveh County, Razavi Khorasan Province, Iran. At the 2006 census, its population was 396, in 79 families.
