= Sar Galan, Razavi Khorasan =

Village in Razavi Khorasan province, Iran

Sar Galan Persian: سرگلان
- Village
- Location within Iran
- Coordinates: 35°14′23″N 59°54′58″E
- Country: Iran
- Province: Razavi Khorasan
- County: Zaveh
- District: Soleyman
- Rural District: Soleyman

Population (2016)
  - Total: 872
- Time zone: UTC+3:30 (IRST)

Sar Galan (Persian: سرگلان) (Note: Also romanized as Sar Galān; also known as Sarkalūn) is a village in Soleyman Rural District of Soleyman District in Zaveh County, Razavi Khorasan province, Iran.

== Demographics ==
=== Population ===
At the time of the 2006 National Census, the village's population was 484 in 108 households, when it was in the former Jolgeh Zaveh District of Torbat-e Heydarieh County. The following census in 2011 counted 911 people in 264 households, by which time the district had been separated from the county in the establishment of Zaveh County. The rural district was transferred to the new Soleyman District. The 2016 census measured the population of the village as 872 people in 245 households.
