= Shahin-e Olya =

Village in Razavi Khorasan province, Iran

Shahin-e Olya Persian: شاهين عليا
- Village
- Location within Iran
- Coordinates: 35°15′52″N 59°58′59″E
- Country: Iran
- Province: Razavi Khorasan
- County: Zaveh
- District: Soleyman
- Rural District: Soleyman

Population (2016)
  - Total: 1,356
- Time zone: UTC+3:30 (IRST)

Shahin-e Olya (Persian: شاهين عليا) (Note: Also romanized as Shāhīn-e ‘Olyā; also known as Kalāt Shahnī and Shāhīn-e Bālā) is a village in Soleyman Rural District of Soleyman District in Zaveh County, Razavi Khorasan province, Iran.

== Demographics ==
=== Population ===
At the time of the 2006 National Census, the village's population was 1,297 in 274 households, when it was in the former Jolgeh Zaveh District of Torbat-e Heydarieh County. The following census in 2011 counted 1,420 people in 373 households, by which time the district had been separated from the county in the establishment of Zaveh County. The rural district was transferred to the new Soleyman District. The 2016 census measured the population of the village as 1,356 people in 366 households.
