= Kalateh-ye Zanganeh =

Village in Razavi Khorasan province, Iran

Kalateh-ye Zanganeh Persian: كلاته زنگنه
- Village
- Location within Iran
- Coordinates: 35°15′59″N 59°23′59″E
- Country: Iran
- Province: Razavi Khorasan
- County: Zaveh
- District: Central
- Rural District: Zaveh

Population (2016)
  - Total: 822
- Time zone: UTC+3:30 (IRST)

Kalateh-ye Zanganeh (Persian: كلاته زنگنه) (Note: Also romanized as Kalāteh-ye Zanganeh) is a village in Zaveh Rural District of the Central District in Zaveh County, Razavi Khorasan province, Iran.

== Demographics ==
=== Population ===
At the time of the 2006 National Census, the village's population was 829 in 165 households, when it was in the former Jolgeh Zaveh District of Torbat-e Heydarieh County. The following census in 2011 counted 859 people in 208 households, by which time the district had been separated from the county in the establishment of Zaveh County. The rural district was transferred to the new Central District. The 2016 census measured the population of the village as 822 people in 220 households.
