= Marjaneh =

Marjaneh مرجانه
- Village
- Location within Iran
- Coordinates: 35°23′46″N 59°20′34″E
- Country: Iran
- Province: Razavi Khorasan
- County: Zaveh
- Bakhsh: Central
- Rural District: Zaveh

Population (2006)
  - Total: 74
- Time zone: UTC+3:30 (IRST)
  - Summer (DST): UTC+4:30 (IRDT)

Marjaneh (Persian: مرجانه, also Romanized as Marjāneh) is a village in Zaveh Rural District, in the Central District of Zaveh County, Razavi Khorasan Province, Iran. At the 2006 census, its population was 74, in 17 families.
