= Soltan Soleyman =

Soltan Soleyman سلطان سليمان
- Village
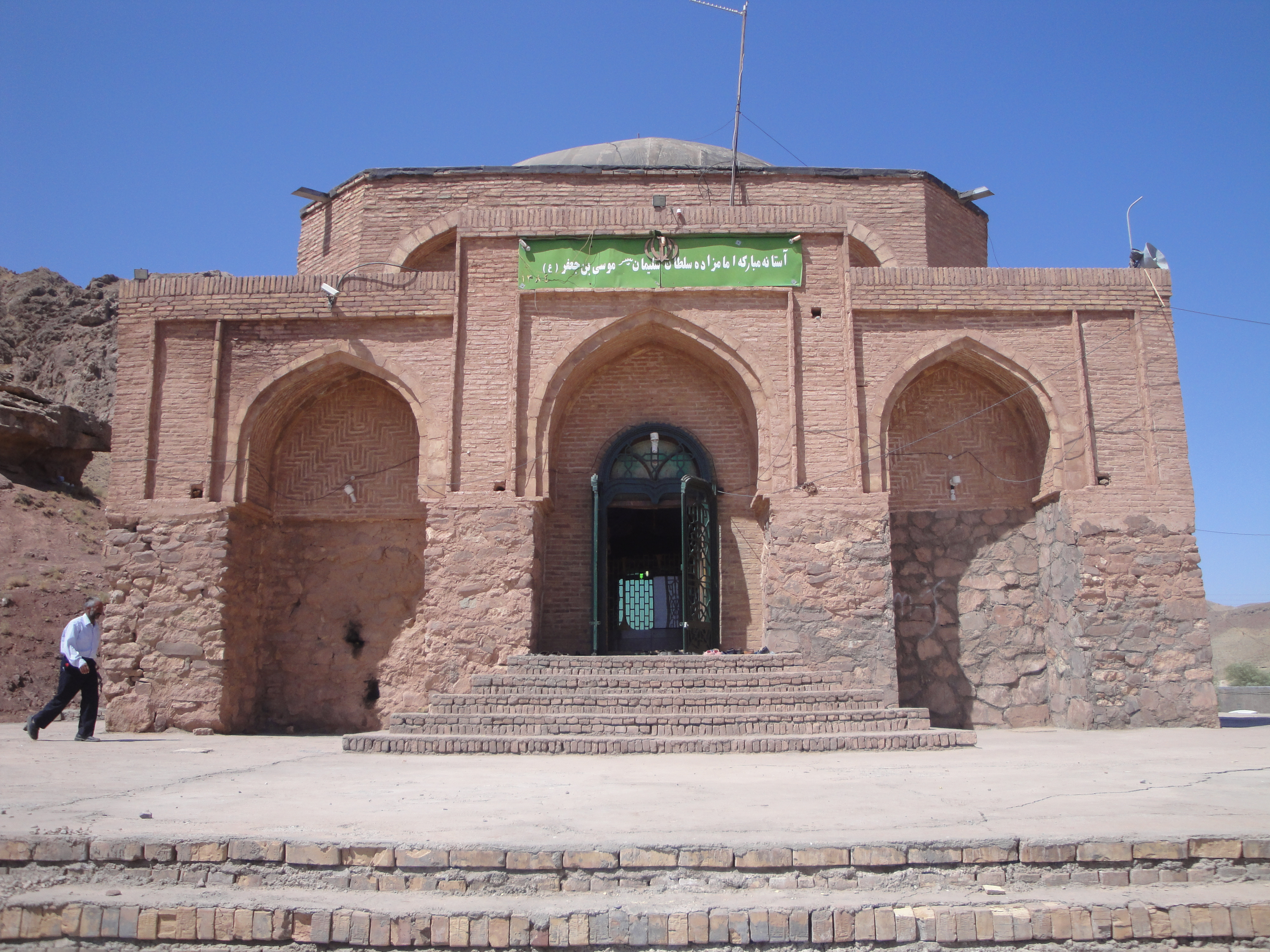

- Location within Iran
- Coordinates: 35°18′09″N 59°53′32″E
- Country: Iran
- Province: Razavi Khorasan
- County: Zaveh
- Bakhsh: Soleyman
- Rural District: Soleyman

Population (2006)
  - Total: 39
- Time zone: UTC+3:30 (IRST)
  - Summer (DST): UTC+4:30 (IRDT)

Soltan Soleyman (Persian: سلطان سليمان, also Romanized as Solţān Soleymān) is a village in Soleyman Rural District, Soleyman District, Zaveh County, Razavi Khorasan Province, Iran. At the 2006 census, its population was 39, in 8 families.
