= Borzu, Zaveh =

Village in Razavi Khorasan province, Iran

Borzu Persian: برزو
- Village
- Location within Iran
- Coordinates: 35°23′13″N 59°36′54″E
- Country: Iran
- Province: Razavi Khorasan
- County: Zaveh
- District: Central
- Rural District: Safaiyeh

Population (2016)
  - Total: 713
- Time zone: UTC+3:30 (IRST)

Borzu (Persian: برزو) (Note: Also romanized as Berzu, Berzū, and Borzū) is a village in Safaiyeh Rural District of the Central District in Zaveh County, Razavi Khorasan province, Iran.

== Demographics ==
=== Population ===
At the time of the 2006 National Census, the village's population was 599 in 115 households, when it was in the former Jolgeh Zaveh District of Torbat-e Heydarieh County. The following census in 2011 counted 724 people in 184 households, by which time the district had been separated from the county in the establishment of Zaveh County. The rural district was transferred to the new Central District. The 2016 census measured the population of the village as 713 people in 208 households.
