= Qaleh Now-ye Safiabad =

Village in Razavi Khorasan province, Iran

Qaleh Now-ye Safiabad Persian: قلعه نوصفي اباد
- Village
- Location within Iran
- Coordinates: 35°16′30″N 59°44′42″E
- Country: Iran
- Province: Razavi Khorasan
- County: Zaveh
- District: Soleyman
- Rural District: Soleyman

Population (2016)
  - Total: 1,171
- Time zone: UTC+3:30 (IRST)

Qaleh Now-ye Safiabad (Persian: قلعه نوصفي اباد) (Note: Also romanized as Qal‘eh Now-ye Şafīābād; also known as Bīābān Shīr and Qal‘eh Now-e Şūfīābād) is a village in Soleyman Rural District of Soleyman District in Zaveh County, Razavi Khorasan province, Iran.

== Demographics ==
=== Population ===
At the time of the 2006 National Census, the village's population was 1,340 in 311 households, when it was in the former Jolgeh Zaveh District of Torbat-e Heydarieh County. The following census in 2011 counted 1,328 people in 373 households, by which time the district had been separated from the county in the establishment of Zaveh County. The rural district was transferred to the new Soleyman District. The 2016 census measured the population of the village as 1,171 people in 332 households.
