= Zaveh =

Zaveh (Persian: زاوه) may refer to:

- Zaveh, Zaveh
- Zaveh County
- Zaveh Rural District
- Zaveh, prior name of Torbat-e Heydarieh
