= Qaleh Ney =

Village in Razavi Khorasan province, Iran

Qaleh Ney Persian: قلعه ني
- Village
- Location within Iran
- Coordinates: 35°17′17″N 59°24′50″E
- Country: Iran
- Province: Razavi Khorasan
- County: Zaveh
- District: Central
- Rural District: Zaveh

Population (2016)
  - Total: 1,242
- Time zone: UTC+3:30 (IRST)

Qaleh Ney (Persian: قلعه ني) (Note: Also romanized as Qal‘eh Ney) is a village in Zaveh Rural District of the Central District in Zaveh County, Razavi Khorasan province, Iran.

== Demographics ==
=== Population ===
At the time of the 2006 National Census, the village's population was 1,489 in 378 households, when it was in the former Jolgeh Zaveh District of Torbat-e Heydarieh County. The following census in 2011 counted 1,280 people in 364 households, by which time the district had been separated from the county in the establishment of Zaveh County. The rural district was transferred to the new Central District. The 2016 census measured the population of the village as 1,242 people in 386 households.
