= Nirab-e Olya =

Nirab-e Olya نيراب عليا
- Village
- Country: Iran
- Province: Razavi Khorasan
- County: Zaveh
- Bakhsh: Soleyman
- Rural District: Soleyman

Population (2006)
  - Total: 225
- Time zone: UTC+3:30 (IRST)
  - Summer (DST): UTC+4:30 (IRDT)

Nirab-e Olya (Persian: نيراب عليا, also Romanized as Nīrāb-e ‘Olyā) is a village in Soleyman Rural District, Soleyman District, Zaveh County, Razavi Khorasan Province, Iran. At the 2006 census, its population was 225, in 43 families.
