= Safiabad, Zaveh =

Village in Razavi Khorasan province, Iran

Safiabad Persian: صفي اباد
- Village
- Location within Iran
- Coordinates: 35°17′32″N 59°38′39″E
- Country: Iran
- Province: Razavi Khorasan
- County: Zaveh
- District: Central
- Rural District: Safaiyeh

Population (2016)
  - Total: 4,410
- Time zone: UTC+3:30 (IRST)

Safiabad (Persian: صفي اباد) (Note: Also romanized as Şafīābād; also known as Şūfīābād) is a village in Safaiyeh Rural District of the Central District in Zaveh County, Razavi Khorasan province, Iran.

== Demographics ==
=== Population ===
At the time of the 2006 National Census, the village's population was 4,305 in 986 households, when it was in the former Jolgeh Zaveh District of Torbat-e Heydarieh County. The following census in 2011 counted 4,598 people in 1,197 households, by which time the district had been separated from the county in the establishment of Zaveh County. The rural district was transferred to the new Central District. The 2016 census measured the population of the village as 4,410 people in 1,263 households, the most populous in its rural district.
