= Anbar Sara =

Anbar Sara عنبرسرا
- Village
- Location within Iran
- Coordinates: 35°24′00″N 59°34′23″E
- Country: Iran
- Province: Razavi Khorasan
- County: Zaveh
- Bakhsh: Central
- Rural District: Zaveh

Population (2006)
  - Total: 815
- Time zone: UTC+3:30 (IRST)
  - Summer (DST): UTC+4:30 (IRDT)

Anbar Sara (Persian: عنبرسرا, also Romanized as ‘Anbar Sarā and Anbār Sarā; also known as ‘Ambar Sarāi and ‘Anbar Sara’ī) is a village in Zaveh Rural District, in the Central District of Zaveh County, Razavi Khorasan Province, Iran. At the 2006 census, its population was 815, in 170 families.

== See also ==
- List of cities, towns and villages in Razavi Khorasan Province
