= Kalateh-ye Now, Zaveh =

Kalateh-ye Now كلاته نو
- Village
- Location within Iran
- Coordinates: 35°15′29″N 59°49′05″E
- Country: Iran
- Province: Razavi Khorasan
- County: Zaveh
- Bakhsh: Soleyman
- Rural District: Soleyman

Population (2006)
  - Total: 245
- Time zone: UTC+3:30 (IRST)
  - Summer (DST): UTC+4:30 (IRDT)

Kalateh-ye Now (Persian: كلاته نو, also Romanized as Kalāteh-ye Now; also known as Kalāteh-ye Mollā) is a village in Soleyman Rural District, Soleyman District, Zaveh County, Razavi Khorasan Province, Iran. At the 2006 census, its population was 245, in 56 families.
