= Marghzar, Razavi Khorasan =

Village in Razavi Khorasan province, Iran

Marghzar Persian: مرغزار
- Village
- Location within Iran
- Coordinates: 35°19′09″N 59°41′05″E
- Country: Iran
- Province: Razavi Khorasan
- County: Zaveh
- District: Central
- Rural District: Safaiyeh

Population (2016)
  - Total: 3,088
- Time zone: UTC+3:30 (IRST)

Marghzar (Persian: مرغزار) (Note: Also romanized as Marghzār) is a village in Safaiyeh Rural District of the Central District in Zaveh County, Razavi Khorasan province, Iran.

== Demographics ==
=== Population ===
At the time of the 2006 National Census, the village's population was 2,933 in 663 households, when it was in the former Jolgeh Zaveh District of Torbat-e Heydarieh County. The following census in 2011 counted 3,532 people in 910 households, by which time the district had been separated from the county in the establishment of Zaveh County. The rural district was transferred to the new Central District. The 2016 census measured the population of the village as 3,088 people in 860 households.
