= Nurabad, Zaveh =

Hossein Abad حسین اباد
- Village
- Location within Iran
- Coordinates: 35°16′47″N 59°21′35″E
- Country: Iran
- Province: Razavi Khorasan
- County: Zaveh
- Bakhsh: Central
- Rural District: Zaveh

Population (2006)
  - Total: 45
- Time zone: UTC+3:30 (IRST)
  - Summer (DST): UTC+4:30 (IRDT)

Hossein Abad (Persian: حسین اباد, also Romanized as Hosseinabad) is a village in Zaveh Rural District, in the Central District of Zaveh County, Razavi Khorasan Province, Iran. At the 2006 census, its population was 45, in 16 families.
