= Jafarabad, Zaveh =

Village in Razavi Khorasan province, Iran

Jafarabad Persian: جعفراباد
- Village
- Location within Iran
- Coordinates: 35°11′41″N 60°00′59″E
- Country: Iran
- Province: Razavi Khorasan
- County: Zaveh
- District: Soleyman
- Rural District: Soleyman

Population (2016)
  - Total: 1,157
- Time zone: UTC+3:30 (IRST)

Jafarabad (Persian: جعفراباد) (Note: Also romanized as Ja‘farābād) is a village in Soleyman Rural District of Soleyman District in Zaveh County, Razavi Khorasan province, Iran.

== Demographics ==
=== Population ===
At the time of the 2006 National Census, the village's population was 805 in 206 households, when it was in the former Jolgeh Zaveh District of Torbat-e Heydarieh County. The following census in 2011 counted 1,168 people in 317 households, by which time the district had been separated from the county in the establishment of Zaveh County. The rural district was transferred to the new Soleyman District. The 2016 census measured the population of the village as 1,157 people in 310 households.
