= Deruk-e Pain =

Deruk-e Pain دروك پائين
- Village
- Location within Iran
- Coordinates: 35°15′34″N 59°25′19″E
- Country: Iran
- Province: Razavi Khorasan
- County: Zaveh
- Bakhsh: Central
- Rural District: Zaveh

Population (2006)
  - Total: 91
- Time zone: UTC+3:30 (IRST)
  - Summer (DST): UTC+4:30 (IRDT)

Deruk-e Pain (Persian: دروك پائين, also romanized as Derūk-e Pā’īn; also known as Dūrūk, Duruk-e Pain, and Dūrūk-e Pā’īn) is a village in Zaveh Rural District, in the Central District of Zaveh County, Razavi Khorasan Province, Iran. At the 2006 census, its population was 91, in 17 families.
