= Niazabad, Zaveh =

Niazabad نيازاباد
- Village
- Location within Iran
- Coordinates: 35°16′03″N 59°26′31″E
- Country: Iran
- Province: Razavi Khorasan
- County: Zaveh
- Bakhsh: Central
- Rural District: Zaveh

Population (2006)
  - Total: 271
- Time zone: UTC+3:30 (IRST)
  - Summer (DST): UTC+4:30 (IRDT)

Niazabad (Persian: نيازاباد, also Romanized as Nīāzābād) is a village in Zaveh Rural District, in the Central District of Zaveh County, Razavi Khorasan Province, Iran. At the 2006 census, its population was 271, in 66 families.
