= Saq, Razavi Khorasan =

Village in Razavi Khorasan province, Iran

Saq Persian: ساق
- Village
- Location within Iran
- Coordinates: 35°05′52″N 59°53′56″E
- Country: Iran
- Province: Razavi Khorasan
- County: Zaveh
- District: Soleyman
- Rural District: Saq

Population (2016)
  - Total: 5,851
- Time zone: UTC+3:30 (IRST)

Saq (Persian: ساق) (Note: Also romanized as Sāq; also known as Sagh) is a village in Saq Rural District of Soleyman District in Zaveh County, Razavi Khorasan province, Iran.

== Demographics ==
=== Population ===
At the time of the 2006 National Census, the village's population was 5,171 in 1,255 households, when it was in Soleyman Rural District of the former Jolgeh Zaveh District in Torbat-e Heydarieh County. The following census in 2011 counted 5,947 people in 1,693 households, by which time the district had been separated from the county in the establishment of Zaveh County. The rural district was transferred to the new Soleyman District, and Saq was transferred to Saq Rural District created in the same district. The 2016 census measured the population of the village as 5,851 people in 1,797 households, the most populous in its rural district.
