= Kalateh-ye Said, Razavi Khorasan =

Kalateh-ye Said كلاته سعيد
- Village
- Location within Iran
- Coordinates: 35°16′38″N 59°25′21″E
- Country: Iran
- Province: Razavi Khorasan
- County: Zaveh
- Bakhsh: Central
- Rural District: Zaveh

Population (2006)
  - Total: 63
- Time zone: UTC+3:30 (IRST)
  - Summer (DST): UTC+4:30 (IRDT)

Kalateh-ye Said (Persian: كلاته سعيد, also Romanized as Kalāteh-ye Sa‘īd; also known as Kalāteh-ye Seyyed and Kalāteh-ye Sefīd) is a village in Zaveh Rural District, in the Central District of Zaveh County, Razavi Khorasan Province, Iran. At the 2006 census, its population was 63, in 18 families.
