= Karizak =

Karizak (Persian: كاريزك) may refer to:

- Karizak, Khalilabad, Razavi Khorasan Province
- Karizak, Sarakhs, Razavi Khorasan Province
- Karizak-e Hajji Pasand, Razavi Khorasan Province
- Karizak-e Kenar Kal, Razavi Khorasan Province
- Karizak-e Khujui, Razavi Khorasan Province
- Karizak-e Kohneh, Razavi Khorasan Province
- Karizak-e Nagahani, Razavi Khorasan Province
- Karizak-e Yaqubkhani, Razavi Khorasan Province

== See also ==
- Kahrizak (disambiguation)
