= Hafezabad =

Hafezabad (Persian: حافظاباد) may refer to:

- Hafezabad, Kerman
- Hafezabad, Khash, Sistan and Baluchestan Province
- Hafezabad, Zahedan, Sistan and Baluchestan Province

== See also ==
- Hafizabad, Iran (disambiguation)
