= Aleyak, Zaveh =

Village in Razavi Khorasan province, Iran

Aleyak Persian: عليك
- Village
- Location within Iran
- Coordinates: 35°16′19″N 60°01′57″E
- Country: Iran
- Province: Razavi Khorasan
- County: Zaveh
- District: Soleyman
- Rural District: Soleyman

Population (2016)
  - Total: 1,521
- Time zone: UTC+3:30 (IRST)

Aleyak (Persian: عليك) (Note: Also romanized as ‘Aleyak, Alīak, Alīk, and ‘Alīyak; also known as Ali Aq) is a village in Soleyman Rural District of Soleyman District in Zaveh County, Razavi Khorasan province, Iran.

== Demographics ==
=== Population ===
At the time of the 2006 National Census, the village's population was 1,513 in 372 households, when it was in the former Jolgeh Zaveh District of Torbat-e Heydarieh County. The following census in 2011 counted 1,658 people in 472 households, by which time the district had been separated from the county in the establishment of Zaveh County. The rural district was transferred to the new Soleyman District. The 2016 census measured the population of the village as 1,521 people in 423 households.
