= Rigan, Razavi Khorasan =

Rigan ريگان
- Village
- Location within Iran
- Coordinates: 35°12′46″N 59°40′27″E
- Country: Iran
- Province: Razavi Khorasan
- County: Zaveh
- Bakhsh: Soleyman
- Rural District: Soleyman

Population (2006)
  - Total: 590
- Time zone: UTC+3:30 (IRST)
  - Summer (DST): UTC+4:30 (IRDT)

Rigan (Persian: ريگان, also Romanized as Rīgān) is a village in Soleyman Rural District, Soleyman District, Zaveh County, Razavi Khorasan Province, Iran. At the 2006 census, its population was 590, in 139 families.
