= Chakhmaq, Razavi Khorasan =

Village in Razavi Khorasan province, Iran

Chakhmaq Persian: چخماق
- Village
- Location within Iran
- Coordinates: 35°16′20″N 59°49′49″E
- Country: Iran
- Province: Razavi Khorasan
- County: Zaveh
- District: Soleyman
- Rural District: Soleyman

Population (2016)
  - Total: 1,780
- Time zone: UTC+3:30 (IRST)

Chakhmaq (Persian: چخماق) (Note: Also romanized as Chakhmāq; also known as Chakmak and Chaqmāq) is a village in Soleyman Rural District of Soleyman District in Zaveh County, Razavi Khorasan province, Iran, serving as capital of both the district and rural district.

== Demographics ==
=== Population ===
At the time of the 2006 National Census, the village's population was 2,065 in 482 households, when it was in the former Jolgeh Zaveh District of Torbat-e Heydarieh County. The following census in 2011 counted 2,478 people in 594 households, by which time the district had been separated from the county in the establishment of Zaveh County. The rural district was transferred to the new Soleyman District. The 2016 census measured the population of the village as 1,780 people in 542 households, the most populous in its rural district.
