= Kalateh-ye Khan, Razavi Khorasan =

Kalateh-ye Khan كلاته خان
- Village
- Location within Iran
- Coordinates: 35°14′17″N 59°49′23″E
- Country: Iran
- Province: Razavi Khorasan
- County: Zaveh
- Bakhsh: Soleyman
- Rural District: Soleyman

Population (2006)
  - Total: 252
- Time zone: UTC+3:30 (IRST)
  - Summer (DST): UTC+4:30 (IRDT)

Kalateh-ye Khan (Persian: كلاته خان, also Romanized as Kalāteh-ye Khān) is a village in Soleyman Rural District, Soleyman District, Zaveh County, Razavi Khorasan Province, Iran. At the 2006 census, its population was 252, in 59 families.
