= Kalateh-ye Said =

Kalateh-ye Said (Persian: كلاته سعيد) may refer to:

- Kalateh-ye Said, Razavi Khorasan
- Kalateh-ye Said, South Khorasan
