= Baba Mahmud =

Baba Mahmud (Persian: بابامحمود) may refer to:

- Baba Mahmud-e Olya
- Baba Mahmud-e Vosta
