= Gowji =

Gowji گوجي
- Village
- Location within Iran
- Coordinates: 35°25′12″N 59°23′27″E
- Country: Iran
- Province: Razavi Khorasan
- County: Zaveh
- Bakhsh: Central
- Rural District: Zaveh

Population (2006)
  - Total: 211
- Time zone: UTC+3:30 (IRST)
  - Summer (DST): UTC+4:30 (IRDT)

Gowji (Persian: گوجي, also Romanized as Gowjī; also known as Gowjīk (Persian: گوجيك), Gorjī, and Gūbī) is a village in Zaveh Rural District, in the Central District of Zaveh County, Razavi Khorasan Province, Iran. At the 2006 census, its population was 211, in 64 families.
