= Hafizabad, Zaveh =

Hafizabad حفيظاباد
- Village
- Location within Iran
- Coordinates: 35°16′14″N 59°22′41″E
- Country: Iran
- Province: Razavi Khorasan
- County: Zaveh
- Bakhsh: Central
- Rural District: Zaveh

Population (2006)
  - Total: 113
- Time zone: UTC+3:30 (IRST)
  - Summer (DST): UTC+4:30 (IRDT)

Hafizabad (Persian: حفيظاباد, also Romanized as Ḩafīz̧ābād) is a village in Zaveh Rural District, in the Central District of Zaveh County, Razavi Khorasan Province, Iran. At the 2006 census, its population was 113, in 26 families.
