= Kariz-e Bala =

Kariz-e Bala كاريزبالا
- Village
- Location within Iran
- Coordinates: 35°17′42″N 59°28′25″E
- Country: Iran
- Province: Razavi Khorasan
- County: Zaveh
- Bakhsh: Central
- Rural District: Zaveh

Population (2006)
  - Total: 537
- Time zone: UTC+3:30 (IRST)
  - Summer (DST): UTC+4:30 (IRDT)

Kariz-e Bala (Persian: كاريزبالا, also Romanized as Kārīz-e Bālā) is a village in Zaveh Rural District, in the Central District of Zaveh County, Razavi Khorasan Province, Iran. At the 2006 census, its population was 537, in 159 families.
