= Shestan Olya =

Shestan Olya شستان عليا
- Village
- Location within Iran
- Coordinates: 35°13′41″N 59°34′53″E
- Country: Iran
- Province: Razavi Khorasan
- County: Zaveh
- Bakhsh: Central
- Rural District: Safaiyeh

Population (2006)
  - Total: 88
- Time zone: UTC+3:30 (IRST)
  - Summer (DST): UTC+4:30 (IRDT)

Shestan Olya (Persian: شستان عليا, also Romanized as Shestān ‘Olyā; also known as Shastān-e Bālā, Shāshtū, Shastān, and Shishtu) is a village in Safaiyeh Rural District, in the Central District of Zaveh County, Razavi Khorasan Province, Iran. At the 2006 census, its population was 88, in 23 families.
