= Sebi, Zaveh =

Sebi صبي
- Village
- Location within Iran
- Coordinates: 35°14′09″N 59°26′46″E
- Country: Iran
- Province: Razavi Khorasan
- County: Zaveh
- Bakhsh: Central
- Rural District: Zaveh

Population (2006)
  - Total: 203
- Time zone: UTC+3:30 (IRST)
  - Summer (DST): UTC+4:30 (IRDT)

Sebi (Persian: صبي, also Romanized as Şebī; also known as Qal‘eh Bālā Şebī) is a village in Zaveh Rural District in the Central District of Zaveh County, Razavi Khorasan Province, Iran. At the 2006 census, its population was 203, with 58 families.
