= Patru =

Patru may refer to:

- Morgane Patru (born 1998), French foil fencer
- Olivier Patru (1604–1681), French lawyer and writer
- Patru, Iran, a village in Razavi Khorasan Province, Iran
