= Gubi =

Gubi may refer to:

- Hübi, Azerbaijan
- Gowji, Iran
