= Shasta =

Shasta or Shastan may refer to:

== Native American ==
- Shasta Costa, a Native American tribe of southwestern Oregon
- Shasta language, extinct language of the Shasta people
- Shasta people, a Native American tribe of northern California and southern Oregon
- Shastan languages, extinct family of languages

== Geography and locations ==
=== United States ===
- Shasta, California, a former mining town (west of present-day Redding, California), now abandoned
- Shasta, Illinois, a ghost town in Illinois
- Mount Shasta, California, a city located southwest of Mount Shasta
- Mount Shasta, part of the Cascade Range in California
- Shasta County, California, named for the mountain
- Shasta Lake, California, a city near Shasta Lake
- Shasta Lake, the reservoir behind Shasta Dam
- Shasta Dam, on the Sacramento River in California
- Shasta River, a river near Mount Shasta
- Shasta Springs, a former resort on the Sacramento River
- Shasta State Historic Park, the current state park at the site of Shasta
- State of Shasta, part of an 1854 proposal to partition California into three states

=== Iran ===
- Shasta, Iran, a village in Mazandaran Province, Iran
- Shastan, Iran, a village in Razavi Khorasan Province, Iran

== People ==
- Shasta Averyhardt, an American golfer on the LPGA
- Shasta Groene, a young girl from Coeur d'Alene, Idaho abducted by Joseph E. Duncan III

== Products ==
- Shasta (drink), a soft drink brand
- Shasta, a former Procter & Gamble shampoo brand
- Shasta travel trailers, an American brand built between 1941–2004

== Arts, entertainment, and media ==
- Shasta (Narnia), the main character in C. S. Lewis' novel The Horse and His Boy (1954)
- "Shasta", the seventh track on singer-songwriter Vienna Teng's album Warm Strangers (2004)
- "Shasta Beast", the twelfth track on the Eagles of Death Metal release Death by Sexy (2006)
- Shasta Fay Hepworth, major character in the Paul Thomas Anderson film Inherent Vice (2014), based on Thomas Pynchon's eponymous novel
- Shasta McNasty, a television sitcom on UPN. The name was shortened to Shasta before season one ended.
- Shasta of the Wolves, a 1919 feral child novel and its title character by Olaf Baker
- Shasta, a Siberian Husky in Snow Buddies
- Shasta Sam, American card game of the German Tarok group

== Other uses ==
- Shasta (deity), a Hindu deity
- Shasta (mascot), the name of the University of Houston's mascot
- SHASTA, the callsign for Lynx Aviation, based in Denver, Colorado
- Leucanthemum × superbum or Shasta daisy, a flower
- Shasta Publishers, a 1950s US science fiction publishing imprint
- USS Shasta, either of two ammunition replenishment ships of the United States Navy
