= Sebi =

Sebi may refer to:

== People ==
- Dr. Sebi or Alfredo Bowman, Honduran self-proclaimed herbalist and healer
- Sebi Tramontana (born 1960), jazz trombonist

== Places ==
- Sebi, Zaveh, Iran

== Music ==
- Sebi (song) - 2019 song by Zalagasper

== Other ==
- Securities and Exchange Board of India
