= SAQ =

SAQ or Saq may refer to:

- the callsign of the Grimeton VLF transmitter near Varberg, Sweden
- the Société des alcools du Québec (Quebec Alcohol Corporation)
- Saky, a city in Crimea also romanized as "Saq"
- Soluble anthraquinone
- the Self Assessment Questionnaire for the Payment Card Industry Data Security Standard (PCI DSS)
- Saq, Markazi, a village in Iran
- Saq, Razavi Khorasan, a village in Iran
- Some Answered Questions, Baháʼí text
