= Rigan =

Rigan (Persian: ريگان) may refer to:

- Refers to anything related to Riga, Latvian capital
- Rigan, Fars
- Rigan, Qir and Karzin, Fars Province
- Rigan, Razavi Khorasan
- Rigan County, in Kerman Province
- Rigan Rural District, in Kerman Province
