= Niazabad =

Niazabad or Neyazabad or Niyaz Abad (Persian: نيازاباد) may refer to:

- Niazabad, Golestan
- Niazabad, Lorestan
- Niazabad, Khvaf, Razavi Khorasan Province
- Niazabad, Zaveh, Razavi Khorasan Province
- Niazabad, Sistan and Baluchestan
