= Hafizabad, Iran =

Hafizabad (Persian: حفيظاباد) may refer to:

- Hafizabad, Khvaf
- Hafizabad, Zaveh

== See also ==
- Hafezabad (disambiguation)
- Hafizabad (disambiguation)
