= Dowlatshahi =

Dowlatshahi دولتشاهي
- Village
- Location within Iran
- Coordinates: 33°28′30″N 48°27′19″E
- Country: Iran
- Province: Lorestan
- County: Khorramabad
- Bakhsh: Central
- Rural District: Dehpir

Population (2006)
  - Total: 296
- Time zone: UTC+3:30 (IRST)
  - Summer (DST): UTC+4:30 (IRDT)

Dowlatshahi (Persian: دولتشاهي, also Romanized as Dowlatshāhī and Daulat Shāh) is a village in Dehpir Rural District, in the Central District of Khorramabad County, Lorestan Province, Iran. At the 2006 census, its population was 296, in 64 families.
