= Autonomous Government of Khorasan =

Military government in Iran from April-November 1921

Autonomous State of Khorasan
- 1921
- Flag
- Status: Unrecognized state
- Capital: Mashhad
- Government: Military dictatorship
- President
  - 2 Apr – 3 Oct 1921: Mohammad Taqi Pessian
- Governor-General
  - 4 Oct – Nov 1921 (acting): Mahmoud Khan Nowzari
  - 16 Nov 1921: Ismail Khan Bahador
- History
  - Established: April 1921
  - Disestablished: November
Preceded by	Succeeded by
Qajar dynasty	Qajar dynasty

The Autonomous Government of Khorasan was a short-lived military state set up in Iran. It was formally established on the April 2, 1921, and collapsed a few months later, on October 6, 1921. Their capital was Mashhad.

== State information ==
- Established: 2 April 1921
- Dissolved: 6 October 1921
- Capital: Mashhad, Khorasan
- Major Administrative Towns: Nishapur, Quchan, Bojnourd, Sabzevar, Torbat-e Heydarieh, Torbat-e-Jam, Ferdows, Tabas, Birjand
- Type of Government: Military Government, Secular, Nationalist
- Area: Consisted of current Iranian provinces: Razavi Khorasan, South Khorasan, North Khorasan, Golestan as well as region of Sistan
- Ethnic groups: Persian, Khorasani Turkish, Kurdish, Turkmen, Baluch, Arabic, Barbari, Qarai Turks
- Religions: Shia Islam, Sunni Islam, Baháʼí Faith
- Currency: Persian Dinar Currency Photos
- Total Armed Forces: 5,000 Gendarms in October, 1921

== Government structure ==
=== Military Governor-General ===
- President of the National Committee of Khorasan (NCK): Colonel Mohammad Taqi Pessian 2 April 1921 to 3 October 1921
- Acting Governor-General Major Mahmoud Khan Nowzari 4 October 1921 to early November, 1921 (Khorasan under Nowzari was not autonomous fully, as Nowzari had surrendered to Persia and was simply acting Governor until arrival of Persia's appointed governor into Mashhad.
- Selfimposed Governor-General Major Ismail Khan Bahador was second-in-command to Pesyan and after Pesyan's death he tried to maintain Khorasan's independence and continue Pesyan's path. He launched a coup against Nowzari on 16 October 1921 when he had him arrested and declared himself Governor-General of Khorasan which didn't last long as Nowzari received help and was rescued from prison.

=== Other senior government officials ===
Official post	Name	Party affiliation
Commander of Armed Forces	Major Ismail Khan Bahador	NCK
Senior Gendarmerie Commander	Major Mahmoud Khan Nowzari	NCK
Director of Revenues	(Belgium) Monsieur Léon Dubois	none
Revenue Accountant and Chief of Police^{a}	Alam-od-dowleh	NCK
Chief of Police^{b}	(Sweden) Major Bronikovsky	none
Mutavallibashi of the Shrine	Zahir-ol-Islam	NCK
Kargozar	Mutasim al-Saltaneh Farrokh	NCK
Owner of Tus Press	Mir Morteza	NCK
Chief Editor of Bahar Newspaper	Sheikh Ahmad Bahar	NCK
Founder of Democratic Party of Khorasan	Mohammad Taghi Bahar	DPK, NCK
Poet	Aref Qazvini	NCK
Mojtahed	Mohammad Najafi Khorasani^{c}	none
Machine-gun Instructor	(Germany) A German national	none
Chief of Excise Department		NCK
Chief of Post Office		NCK
Chief of Telegraph Office		NCK
Director of Education		NCK
Chief of Customs Department		NCK
Chief of Justice Department		NCK

a. From 24 August to 3 October.
b. Until 24 August.
c. Also known as "Aghazadeh".

=== Gendarmerie stations ===
Chief	Location	Name
Colonel Mohammad Taqi Pessian	Mashhad	Ordu-ye Mashhad
Major Mahmoud Nowzari	Quchan	Ordu-ye Naderi
Major Ismail Bahador	Sabzevar	Ordu-ye Qader
Captain Mohammad Taqi Kavoussi	Torbat-e Heydarieh	Ordu-ye Kaveh
Captain Alireza Shamshir	Torbat-e Jam	Ordu-ye Shamshir
Captain Abdolrazaq Sepehri	Gonabad	Ordu-ye Barq

=== Regional Administrators and Tribal Chieftains ===
Administrator/Tribal Chief	Region Capital	Tribe/clan Ethnicity
Ismail Shawkat-ol-Molk II	Qayenat / Sistan capital Birjand	Khozaima tribe Arab
Salar Khan Baluch	Torbat-e Heydarieh	Baluch
Ibrahim Khan Baluch	Torbat-e Heydarieh	Baluch
Jafar Khan Qaraei	Torbat-e Heydarieh	Qaraei tribe Qaraei
Heydar Shah		Barbari tribe Barbari
Mir Ali Ahmad		Barbari tribe Barbari
Shawkat-od-Dowleh	capital Torbat-e Jam	Teymouri tribe Aimak
Shoja-ol-Molk		Hazara tribe Hazara
Taj Mohammad Khan	Quchan capital Quchan	Za'faranlu tribe
Mohammad Ibrahim Khan Qaramanlu	Quchan capital Quchan	Qaramanlu clan Kurdish

== Establishment ==
On April 2, 1921, Colonel Pesyan, Chief of Gendarmerie of Khorasan, along with his cousin General Heydargholli Pesyan, a commander of the Iranian Cossack Brigade, had Ahmad Qavam, the Governor-general of Khorasan, removed in a military coup. He was arrested and sent to Tehran. Qavam and several other dominant figures in Khorasan were charged with tax evasion charges, the evidence for which were provided to Pesyan by a Belgian named Dubois who was Director of Revenue in Khorasan.

While Qavam was in prison in Tehran, Pesyan was declared Governor-general of Khorasan and ruled Khorasan autonomously even though he was a supporter of Seyyed Zia'eddin Tabatabaee, then the Prime Minister of Persia.

In May 1921, Qavam was freed from prison and Tabatabaee was no longer Prime Minister. Qavam became Prime Minister and planned to take revenge on Pesyan. As of May 30, 1921, Pesyan declared that Khorasan was fully Autonomous and he established the National Committee of Khorasan or Komitey-e Melli-e Khorasan in Persian. The committee started a program of plans and reforms, but faced some fierce opposition by some tribal and religious leaders.

== Plans ==
Commenced between 2 April to 25 May

- Reform the military organisation of Khorasan and proclamation of martial law. The nizam (infantry) and Gendarmerie were combined to form this new force. New soldiers were heavily recruited for the new force. In April there were only 200 Gendarmes while in October there were approximately 5,000.
- Setup of a finance commission to investigate and assess revenue claims. This had outraged wealthy tribal chiefs and merchants.
- Reform of the shrine administration; this included steps to be taken against those shrine administrators who had consumed vast amounts of shrine revenues.
- Subsidy of two local newspapers: Sharq-e-Iran (The East of Iran) and Mihr-e-Monir (The Shining Sun) to support the government of Seyed Zia Tabatabaei.

Commenced between 26 May to 6 Oct

- Imposition of censorship in the telegraph office.
- Series of arrests of persons believed to have been collaborating with Persia's Central Government of Ahmad Qavam.
- Kumiteye Melli-e Khorasan (National Committee of Khorasan) issued a manifesto on 15 September 1921, and prepared a proclamation declaring Khorasan a republic which was postponed by Colonel Pesyan and never implemented.
- Sold a large amount of grain to a Bolshevik Food Purchasing Commission.
- Extracted forced loans from the wealthy and auctioned off the belongings of the defeated tribal chiefs.
- Encouraged anti-British stance, pro-Soviet ideas and Persian Nationalist beliefs.
- Imposed a poll tax on all travelers leaving Mashhad and 10% tax on all exports.
- Encouraged export of goods to Afghanistan and Soviet Union.
- Establishment of a local bank in September 1921.
- Striking of its own coinage was also considered.
- Steps for the inception of a Department of Education were taken; Colonel Pesyan himself gave money in the interests of female schooling.

== Battles ==
Several tribal leaders who had lost most of their wealth and belongings due to Pesyan's reform programs were supported by Qavam's government. Therefore, on August 11, 1921, the first battle took place between a detachment of Gendarmes in a village near Kariz on Afghanistan border and forces of Hazara chief Shuja al-Mulk. Gendarmes defeated and fled to Mashhad. This defeat results in appointment of Shawkat al-Dowlah a rival of Shuja al-Mulk as Governor of Torbat-e-Jam with a task to deal with disturbances and a sending of strong numerous gendarme forces on August 20, 1921.

In September, 1921 Gendarme forces from Kariz, Torbat-e-Jam, Torbat-e Heydarieh defeated the strong tribal confederatory force of Hazara, Baluch, Barbari and Qarai Turks, whose leaders were Shuja al-Mulk, Seyed Heydar Barbari, Salar Khan Baluch, Mir Ali Ahmad Barbari, Ibrahim Khan Baluch and Jafar Khan Qaraei in a battle which took place in Bakharz. Shuja fled to Afghanistan and the tribal disturbances in the south-east were stopped.

On October 3, 1921, Pesyan himself took to battle, personally leading his 150 Gendarmes to fight a Kurdish coalition tribal force which had more than 1,000 men, led by Sardar of Bojnurd and Taj Mohammad Khan of Quchan, who were also financially and militarily aided by the British and the Persian government of Ahmad Qavam. Pesyan fought bravely with only 60 bullets, however he and his small force were circled by the Kurds and massacred. Pesyan's head was cut off as proof of his death and sent to Qavam.

== Collapse ==
After Pesyan's death, the committee was no longer united. A new rivalry started between Nowzari and Ismail Khan Bahador, who were Pesyan's partisans. Nowzari managed to take charge of Khorasan and he surrendered to Persia's government. In November, 1921 a strong military force of Gendarmes and Cossacks arrived in Mashhad and handed the administrative duties to the newly appointed Governor-General of the province.

== Bibliography ==
- Cronin, S. "An Experiment in Revolutionary Nationalism: The Rebellion of Colonel Muhammad Taqi Khan Pasyan in Mashhad, April–October 1921", Journal of Middle Eastern Studies, Vol.33, No. 4 October 1997, pp. 693–750.
