= Sagh =

Sagh or Saq (Persian: ساق) may refer to:

- Sagh, Markazi
- Sagh, Razavi Khorasan
