= Sorkhi =

Sorkhi (Persian: سرخي) may refer to:

- Sorkhi, Isfahan
- Sorkhi, Razavi Khorasan
