= Karizak-e Nagahani =

Village in Razavi Khorasan province, Iran

Karizak-e Nagahani Persian: كاريزك ناگهاني
- Village
- Location within Iran
- Coordinates: 35°18′26″N 59°23′37″E
- Country: Iran
- Province: Razavi Khorasan
- County: Zaveh
- District: Central
- Rural District: Zaveh

Population (2016)
  - Total: 2,920
- Time zone: UTC+3:30 (IRST)

Karizak-e Nagahani (Persian: كاريزك ناگهاني) (Note: Also romanized as Kārīzak-e Nāgahānī; also known as Kahrīzak, Kārīzak, Kārīzak-e Khūjavī, Kārīzak-e Nāgahān, and Kārīzak-e Nāghānī) is a village in, and the capital of, Zaveh Rural District in the Central District of Zaveh County, Razavi Khorasan province, Iran.

== Demographics ==
=== Population ===
At the time of the 2006 National Census, the village's population was 2,821 in 684 households, when it was in the former Jolgeh Zaveh District of Torbat-e Heydarieh County. The following census in 2011 counted 3,144 people in 849 households, by which time the district had been separated from the county in the establishment of Zaveh County. The rural district was transferred to the new Central District. The 2016 census measured the population of the village as 2,920 people in 802 households, the most populous in its rural district.
