= Aliyak =

Aliyak or Aliak or Aleyak or Ali Aq (Persian: عليك) may refer to:

- Aliyak, Khoshab
- Aleyak, Zaveh
