= Malekabad, Khorramabad =

Village in Lorestan province, Iran

Malekabad Persian: ملك اباد
- Village
- Location within Iran
- Country: Iran
- Province: Lorestan
- County: Khorramabad
- District: Central
- Rural District: Dehpir-e Jonubi

Population (2016)
  - Total: 1,037
- Time zone: UTC+3:30 (IRST)

Malekabad (Persian: ملك اباد) (Note: Also romanized as Maleḵābād) is a village in Dehpir-e Jonubi Rural District (Note: Formerly Dehpir Rural District) of the Central District in Khorramabad County, Lorestan province, Iran.

== Demographics ==
=== Population ===
At the time of the 2006 National Census, the village's population was 286 in 72 households. The following census in 2011 counted 943 people in 116 households. The 2016 census measured the population of the village as 1,037 people in 143 households.
