= Baba Mahmud-e Vosta =

Baba Mahmud-e Vosta بابامحمودوسطي
- Village
- Location within Iran
- Coordinates: 33°28′03″N 48°32′09″E
- Country: Iran
- Province: Lorestan
- County: Khorramabad
- Bakhsh: Central
- Rural District: Dehpir

Population (2006)
  - Total: 141
- Time zone: UTC+3:30 (IRST)
  - Summer (DST): UTC+4:30 (IRDT)

Baba Mahmud-e Vosta (Persian: بابامحمودوسطي, also Romanized as Bābā Maḩmūd-e Vosţá) is a village in Dehpir Rural District, in the Central District of Khorramabad County, Lorestan Province, Iran. At the 2006 census, its population was 141, in 38 families.
