= Hafizabad (disambiguation) =

Hafizabad can refer to:

- Hafizabad Union, Panchagarh Sadar, Rangpur Division, Bangladesh
- Hafizabad, Iran
- Hafizabad District, Gujrat Division, Punjab, Pakistan
  - Hafizabad Tehsil
    - Hafizabad town
      - Hafizabad railway station
- Hafizabad (Pilibhit), Uttar Pradesh, India
