= Chaleh-ye Kamalvand =

Chaleh-ye Kamalvand چاله كمالوند
- Village
- Location within Iran
- Coordinates: 33°27′50″N 48°26′12″E
- Country: Iran
- Province: Lorestan
- County: Khorramabad
- Bakhsh: Central
- Rural District: Dehpir

Population (2006)
  - Total: 266
- Time zone: UTC+3:30 (IRST)
  - Summer (DST): UTC+4:30 (IRDT)

Chaleh-ye Kamalvand (Persian: چاله كمالوند, also Romanized as Chāleh-ye Kamālvand; also known as Kamālvand, Kamālvand-e Golām‘alī, and Kamalwand) is a village in Dehpir Rural District, in the Central District of Khorramabad County, Lorestan Province, Iran. At the 2006 census, its population was 266, in 60 families.
