= Sarab-e Pardeh Chahi =

Village in Lorestan province, Iran

Sarab-e Pardeh Chahi Persian: سراب پرده چاهي
- Village
- Location within Iran
- Coordinates: 33°26′58″N 48°28′54″E
- Country: Iran
- Province: Lorestan
- County: Khorramabad
- District: Central
- Rural District: Dehpir-e Jonubi

Population (2016)
  - Total: 552
- Time zone: UTC+3:30 (IRST)

Sarab-e Pardeh Chahi (Persian: سراب پرده چاهي) (Note: Also romanized as Sarāb-e Pardeh Chāhī; also known as Sarab Pardeh and Sarāb-e Pardeh Chāy) is a village in Dehpir-e Jonubi Rural District (Note: Formerly Dehpir Rural District) of the Central District in Khorramabad County, Lorestan province, Iran.

== Demographics ==
=== Population ===
At the time of the 2006 National Census, the village's population was 549 in 118 households. The following census in 2011 counted 603 people in 168 households. The 2016 census measured the population of the village as 552 people in 156 households.
