= Tabriz during World War I =

City in the East Azerbaijan region of Iran

- Part of Persian campaign (World War I)
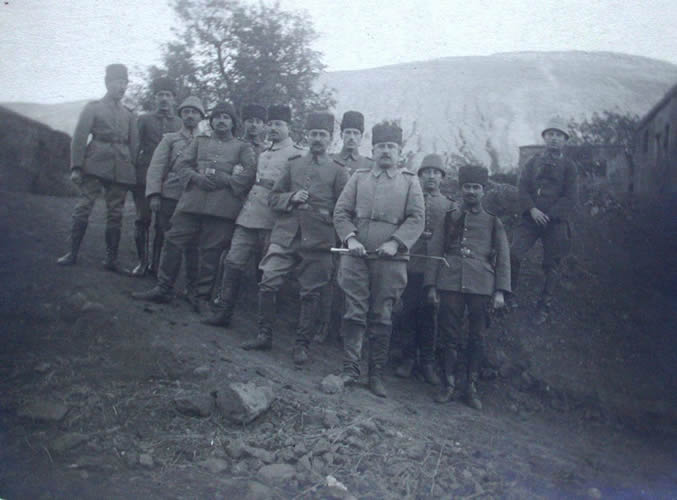
- Ottoman troops around Tabriz, 1917.
Date	1914–1918
Location	Tabriz

Belligerents
Qajar Iran	Ottoman Empire (Simko Shikak) Shekak tribes	Russia; Armenian Volunteers

Commanders and leaders
Mohammad Taqi Pessian; Mohammad Hassan Mirza; Malek Mansur Mirza	(Ottoman Empire) Kâzım (Karabekir) Bey (Ottoman Empire) Ali Ihsan Pasha; Simko Shikak	(Russian Empire) Nikolai Baratov (Russian Empire) Fyodor Chernozubov; Tovmas Nazarbekian

Units involved
Persian Gendarmerie	Islamic Army of the Caucasus; Shekak Militants	Russian Caucasus Army; Armenian Volunteers; Persian Cossack Brigade

The city of Tabriz in the East Azerbaijan region of Iran changed hands several times during World War I (1914–1918) between forces of the Ottoman Empire and the Russian Empire.

At the start of the war Tabriz was already held by Russian forces and had been since the Russian occupation of 1911. On 31 June 1914, three days after the war began, the Iranian government declared neutrality. Despite this, once the Russians started their campaign in autumn, they sent additional forces to northwestern Iran, reinforcing the 10,000 men already there with an additional 60,000.

On 2 January 1915, at the Battle of Sarikamish in the Caucasus, Ottoman forces started their campaign inside Iran and forced Russian forces to retreat to Jolfa. During this campaign, Ottoman forces occupied Tabriz.

With fresh forces, the Russians defeated Ottoman forces south of Jolfa and regained control of Tabriz in early February 1915. The Russians proceeded on toward the west, invaded Urmia and went up to Van Lake. At the same time the Russians entered central Iran and occupied Qazvin, Karaj, and Tehran.

After the February Revolution in 1917, front-line Russian forces dissolved and started to retreat from Iran. Ottoman forces quickly took action and occupied northwestern Iran and Tabriz. They stayed in Tabriz until 23 August 1918, despite two British efforts to dislodge them.

== See also ==
- Persian Campaign
