= Mohammad Taqi Pessian =

Iranian politician

Mohammad-Taqi Pessian
- محمدتقی‌ پسیان
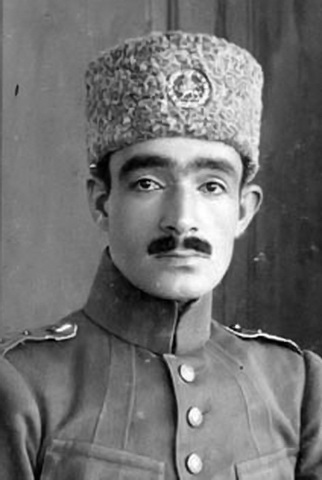

President of Autonomous Government of Khorasan
- In office 2 April 1921 – 3 October 1921

Personal details
- Born: 1892 Tabriz, Qajar Iran
- Died: 3 October 1921 (aged 28–29) Quchan, Qajar Iran
- Resting place: Tomb of Nader Shah
- Party: Democrat Party
- Awards: Iron Cross; Gallipoli Star

Military service
- Allegiance: Qajar Iran
- Branch/service: Persian Gendarmerie
- Years of service: 1907–1921
- Rank: Colonel
- Battles/wars: Persian Constitutional Revolution; World War I; Persian campaign; Battle of Musalla (1915); Battle of Kangavar (1915); Occupation of Tabriz (1918); Kurdish separatism in Iran; Simko Shikak revolt (1918–1922)

Mohammad-Taqi Khan Pessian (Persian: محمدتقی‌خان پسیان; 1892 – 3 October 1921), more commonly known as Colonel Pessian, was an Iranian gendarme of Kurdish origin. He was born to Moḥammad-Bāqer Khan Pesyān and his wife Fāṭema Solṭān, into a prominent, apparently Amir Solaymāni Kurdish family, who had emigrated from the Caucasus after Iran’s defeat in the Russo-Persian War of 1826-28 and the incorporation of territories into the Russian Empire (Pesyān, pp. 26–27). He was a fighter pilot and warlord who formed and led the short-lived Autonomous Government of Khorasan in 1921. He was killed in a skirmish by Kurdish tribal forces in a battle with forces sent by Ahmad Qavam, the prime minister at the time.

== Biography ==
Pessian was born into an aristocratic Kurdish family in Tabriz. Pessian's family possessed strong military traditions, his uncle General Khan Pessian was a commander in the Persian Cossack Brigade, his cousins Heydar Qoli Khan Pessian – father of Iranian author and journalist, Mahtalat Pessian, – Ali Qoli Khan Pessian, Gholam Reza Khan Pessian and he himself served in the Gendarmerie.

In Tabriz Mohammad Taqi was educated in sciences, Turkish, Persian, Arabic and foreign languages. In 1907 he left for Tehran to continue his education. After 5 years he took up the rank of second lieutenant in the Gendarmerie, within two years he was promoted to captain. After that he held a variety of posts such as second commander in a battalion in Qazvin, served in Hamedan and Yazd and also was an instructor and interpreter at the Gendarmerie school in Yusef Abad, Tehran. He was promoted to major when World War I broke out.

=== Persian Campaign ===
In November 1915 as commander of the Gendarmerie in Hamedan he launched an attack on the pro-Russian Persian Cossack Brigade at the Battle of Musalla. His gendarmes managed to disarm the Persian Cossacks and Mohammad Taqi managed to convince some of the cossacks to join his forces in a patriotic speech he made to them after their defeat. Mohammad Taqi and Major Azizollah Khan Zarghami as Gendarmerie commanders could not defend Hamedan against an advancing Russian Caucasus Army which was superior in numbers and weapons. The gendarmes retreated to Kermanshah where they were defeated by the Russians, with many fleeing to the Ottoman Empire. August 1916 saw the return of gendarmes to Kermanshah but again were defeated and this time many went to live in exile in Istanbul while Mohammad Taqi returned to live in exile in Berlin.

=== Exile ===
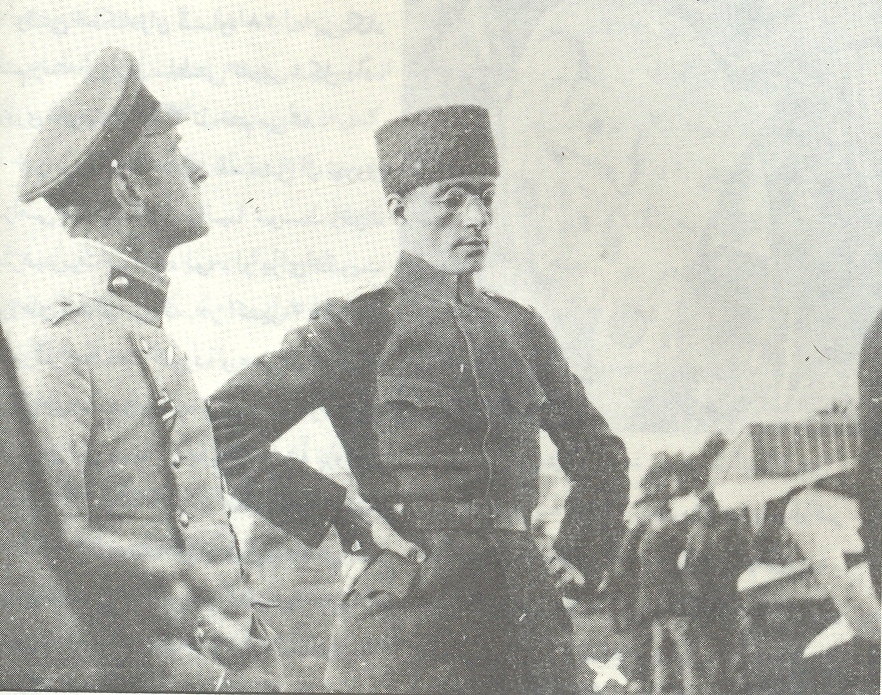
Colonel Pessian in Germany

During his time in Berlin, he was trained as a pilot in the German Airforce and was rewarded with the Eisernes Kreuz Medal for shooting down more than 25 enemy aircraft during World War I. He also translated many works from Persian to/from French, German and English, some of these included Alphonse de Lamartine and Rabindranath Tagore. He also wrote two books in Persian, Sargozasht-e yek javan-e vatandoust and Jang-e Moqaddas az Baghdad ta Iran.

== Return to Iran and death ==
In 1920 Mohammad Taqi returned to Iran and joined the Gendarmerie. In June 1920 he was promoted to the rank of colonel and in September 1920 he became commander of Gendarmerie of Khorasan. On 3 April 1921 in a military coup with his small force of only 200 gendarmes, he had Ahmad Qavam, the Governor-general of Khorasan, arrested and sent him to Tehran where he was imprisoned. He then became head of the provincial Autonomous Government of Khorasan.

In June, Ahmad Qavam was released from prison and became Premier of Iran. He was determined to take revenge & suppress Pessian. He did so by gaining the approval of Reza Khan & dispatching the Cossack forces to Khorasan. Having previously been the governor of that province, Qavam had developed a strong relationship with the local chieftains and dispatched them to confront Pessian also. Sardar Mo’azez Khan Bojnurdi succeeded in gaining the cooperation of the Shirvan chieftains in mobilizing the kurds in Quchan. To combat this, Pessian gathered his scant forces to face the insurgency in Ja’farabad (near Quchan). This occurred on 3 October 1921, when Pessian and his small force of 150 gendarmes faced a force of over 1,000 mounted Kurdish tribesmen. In the fight that ensued, some of the gendarmes left the battlefield. Many of Pessian's comrades were killed, and he was eventually surrounded and beheaded by Kurdish tribesmen led by Farajullah Khan.

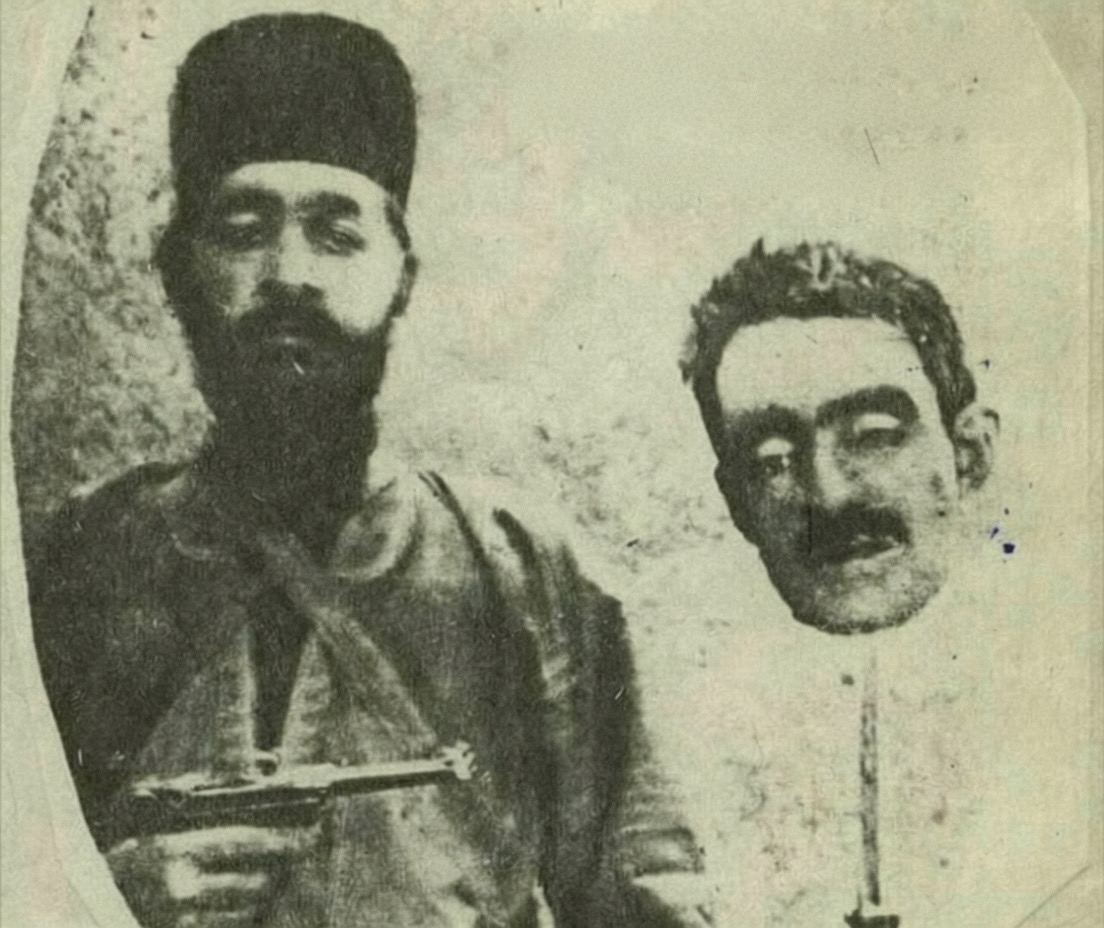
A Khorasani Kurdish soldier standing beside his severed head.

His head was brought to Tehran to prove that he had been killed. For five continuous years after his death, on 3 October people of Khorasan mourned his death.

He is buried in Mashhad, Khorasan in the same garden that contains Nader Shah's tomb.

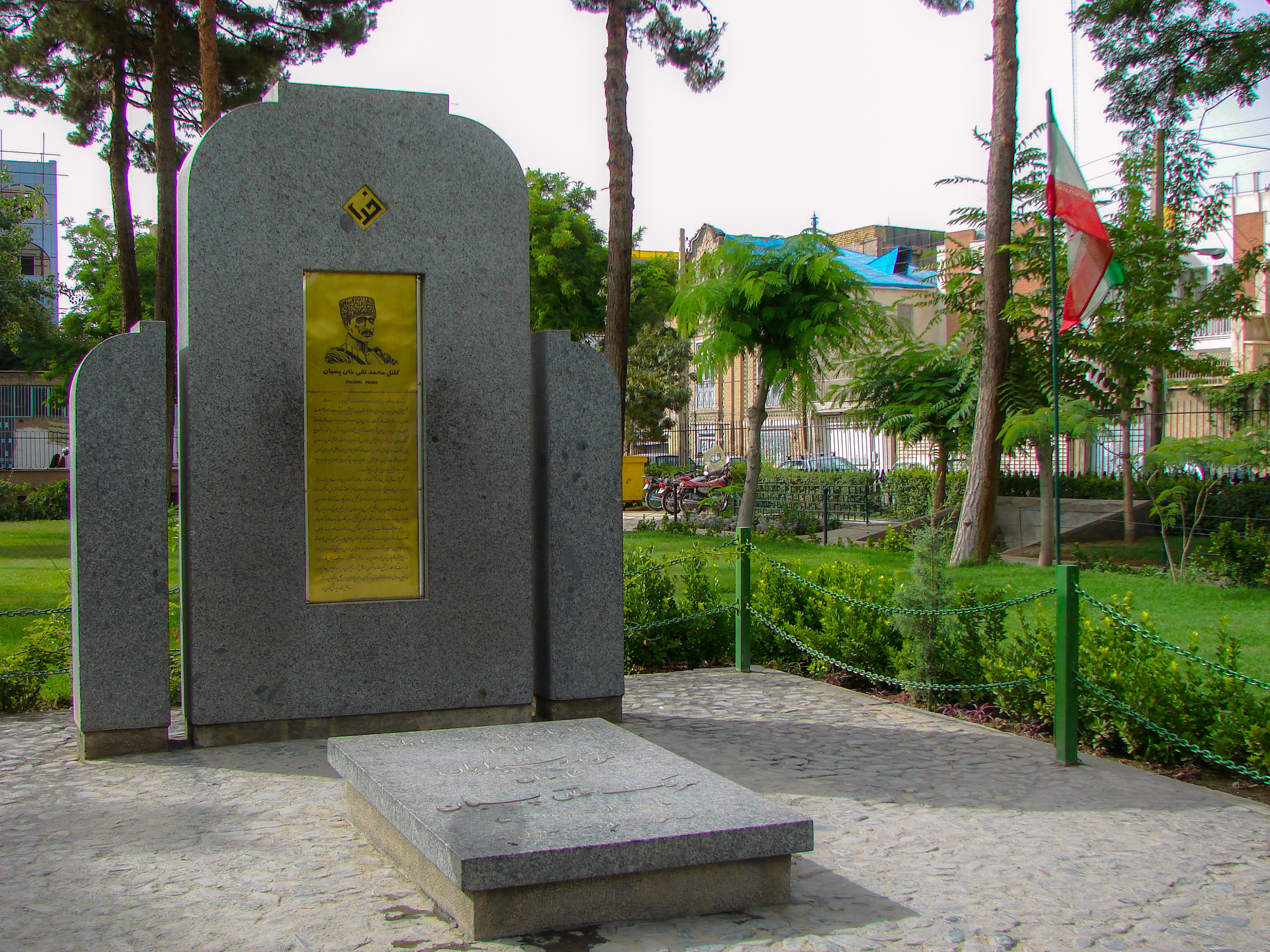
The tomb of Mohammad Taqi Khan Pessian

=== Legacy ===
The day after the Shah left Iran in February 1979 during the Iranian Revolution, the revolutionary leaders declared Colonel Mohammad Taqi Pessian as the first Martyr of the Revolution although Pessian was a Secularist. Other anti-Pahlavi figures such as Mirza Kuchik Khan and Hassan Modarres were also declared as matyrs.

== Achievements in Germany ==
In Germany, he continued his military training, first in the German air force and then in the infantry. He also engaged in a variety of intellectual, cultural and political activities. He wrote an account of his own life, Sargozasht-e Yek Javān-e Vatandust, and of his experiences in western during the war, Jang-e Moqaddas Az Baghdād Tā Irān. He translated widely between Persian and various European languages, including German, French and English. His love of poetry, especially that which was politically committed, was particularly evident and his choice of works for translation, for example of Alphonse de Lamartine and Rabindranath Tagore, illustrated his own romantic nationalism. He studied European music, learning to play the piano, and transposed Persian national songs into German. On a more overtly political level he was in contact with the Iranian radicals led by Hassan Taqizadeh and grouped around the periodical Kavih, for which he occasionally wrote articles.
