= Kamalvand-e Iman Ali =

Kamalvand-e Iman Ali كمالوندايمان علي
- Village
- Country: Iran
- Province: Lorestan
- County: Khorramabad
- Bakhsh: Central
- Rural District: Dehpir

Population (2006)
  - Total: 337
- Time zone: UTC+3:30 (IRST)
  - Summer (DST): UTC+4:30 (IRDT)

Kamalvand-e Iman Ali (Persian: كمالوندايمان علي, also Romanized as Kamālvand-e Imān ʿAlī) is a village in Dehpir Rural District, in the Central District of Khorramabad County, Lorestan Province, Iran. At the 2006 census, its population was 337, in 70 families.
