= Saq Rural District =

Rural district in Razavi Khorasan province, Iran

Saq Rural District Persian: دهستان ساق
- Rural District
- Location within Iran
- Coordinates: 35°06′N 59°55′E
- Country: Iran
- Province: Razavi Khorasan
- County: Zaveh
- District: Soleyman
- Established: 2008
- Capital: Qaleh-ye Aqa Hasan

Population (2016)
  - Total: 16,472
- Time zone: UTC+3:30 (IRST)

Saq Rural District (Persian: دهستان ساق) is in Soleyman District of Zaveh County, Razavi Khorasan province, Iran. Its capital is the village of Qaleh-ye Aqa Hasan.

== History ==
In 2008, Jolgeh Zaveh District was separated from Torbat-e Heydarieh County in the establishment of Zaveh County, and Saq Rural District was created in the new Soleyman District.

== Demographics ==
=== Population ===
At the time of the 2011 National Census, the rural district's population was 16,147 in 4,445 households. The 2016 census measured the population of the rural district as 16,472 in 4,815 households. The most populous of its 31 villages was Saq, with 5,851 people.

=== Other villages in the rural district ===
- Bidvey
- Firuzabad
- Kahijeh
- Kashkak
- Mohammadabad
- Nasirabad
