= Kahriz-e Olya, Harsin =

Kahriz-e Olya كهريزعليا
- Village
- Location within Iran
- Coordinates: 34°16′34″N 47°38′04″E
- Country: Iran
- Province: Kermanshah
- County: Harsin
- Bakhsh: Central
- Rural District: Howmeh

Population (2006)
  - Total: 277
- Time zone: UTC+3:30 (IRST)
  - Summer (DST): UTC+4:30 (IRDT)

Kahriz-e Olya (Persian: كهريزعليا, also Romanized as Kahrīz-e ‘Olyā) is a village in Howmeh Rural District, in the Central District of Harsin County, Kermanshah Province, Iran. At the 2006 census, its population was 277, in 57 families.
