= Kahriz, Selseleh =

Kahriz كهريز
- Village
- Location within Iran
- Coordinates: 33°53′39″N 48°11′01″E
- Country: Iran
- Province: Lorestan
- County: Selseleh
- Bakhsh: Firuzabad
- Rural District: Firuzabad

Population (2006)
  - Total: 317
- Time zone: UTC+3:30 (IRST)
  - Summer (DST): UTC+4:30 (IRDT)

Kahriz (Persian: كهريز, also Romanized as Kahrīz) is a village in Firuzabad Rural District, Firuzabad District, Selseleh County, Lorestan Province, Iran. At the 2006 census, its population was 317, in 75 families.
