= Pa Qaleh, Lorestan =

Pa Qaleh پاقلعه
- Village
- Location within Iran
- Coordinates: 33°20′41″N 48°33′23″E
- Country: Iran
- Province: Lorestan
- County: Khorramabad
- Bakhsh: Central
- Rural District: Kakasharaf

Population (2006)
  - Total: 119
- Time zone: UTC+3:30 (IRST)
  - Summer (DST): UTC+4:30 (IRDT)

Pa Qaleh (Persian: پاقلعه, also Romanized as Pā Qal‘eh) is a village in Kakasharaf Rural District, in the Central District of Khorramabad County, Lorestan Province, Iran. At the 2006 census, its population was 119, in 28 families.
