= Kahriz-e Jadid =

Village in Lorestan province, Iran

Kahriz-e Jadid Persian: كهريزجديد
- Village
- Location within Iran
- Coordinates: 33°28′14″N 48°24′28″E
- Country: Iran
- Province: Lorestan
- County: Khorramabad
- District: Central
- Rural District: Dehpir-e Jonubi

Population (2016)
  - Total: 838
- Time zone: UTC+3:30 (IRST)

Kahriz-e Jadid (Persian: كهريزجديد) (Note: Also romanized as Kahrīz-e Jadīd) is a village in Dehpir-e Jonubi Rural District (Note: Formerly Dehpir Rural District) of the Central District in Khorramabad County, Lorestan province, Iran.

== Demographics ==
=== Population ===
At the time of the 2006 National Census, the village's population was 907 in 192 households. The following census in 2011 counted 947 people in 250 households. The 2016 census measured the population of the village as 838 people in 238 households.
