= Hafezabad, Kerman =

Hafezabad حافظاباد
- Village
- Location within Iran
- Coordinates: 29°30′48″N 55°30′00″E
- Country: Iran
- Province: Kerman
- County: Sirjan
- Bakhsh: Central
- Rural District: Zeydabad

Population (2006)
  - Total: 303
- Time zone: UTC+3:30 (IRST)
  - Summer (DST): UTC+4:30 (IRDT)

Hafezabad (Persian: حافظاباد, also Romanized as Ḩāfez̧ābād; also known as Dabestān-e Ḩāfez̧ābād) is a village in Zeydabad Rural District, in the Central District of Sirjan County, Kerman Province, Iran. At the 2006 census, its population was 303, in 87 families.
