= Kamalvand-e Mohammad Hasan Parvaneh =

Village in Lorestan province, Iran

Kamalvand-e Mohammad Hasan Parvaneh Persian: کمالوند محمد حسن پروانه
- Village
- Location within Iran
- Coordinates: 33°27′58″N 48°26′09″E
- Country: Iran
- Province: Lorestan
- County: Khorramabad
- District: Central
- Rural District: Dehpir-e Jonubi

Population (2016)
  - Total: 561
- Time zone: UTC+3:30 (IRST)

Kamalvand-e Mohammad Hasan Parvaneh (Persian: کمالوند محمد حسن پروانه) (Note: Also romanized as Kamālvand Moḥammad Ḩasan Parvāneh; also known as Kamalvand-e Mohammad Hoseyn Parvaneh and Kamālvand Moḥammad Ḩoseyn Parvāneh) is a village in Dehpir-e Jonubi Rural District (Note: Formerly Dehpir Rural District) of the Central District in Khorramabad County, Lorestan province, Iran.

== Demographics ==
=== Population ===
At the time of the 2006 National Census, the village's population was 405 in 90 households. The following census in 2011 counted 350 people in 94 households. The 2016 census measured the population of the village as 561 people in 147 households.
