= Kariz-e Diklan =

Kariz-e Diklan كاريزديكلن
- Village
- Location within Iran
- Coordinates: 35°39′44″N 59°43′15″E
- Country: Iran
- Province: Razavi Khorasan
- County: Fariman
- Bakhsh: Central
- Rural District: Fariman

Population (2006)
  - Total: 37
- Time zone: UTC+3:30 (IRST)
  - Summer (DST): UTC+4:30 (IRDT)

Kariz-e Diklan (Persian: كاريزديكلن, also Romanized as Kārīz-e Dīklan; also known as Kāvīz-e Dīklan and Dīglān) is a village in Fariman Rural District, in the Central District of Fariman County, Razavi Khorasan Province, Iran. At the 2006 census, its population was 37, in 7 families.
