= Kamalvand-e Gholam Ali =

Village in Lorestan province, Iran

Kamalvand-e Gholam Ali Persian: كمالوندغلامعلي
- Village
- Location within Iran
- Coordinates: 33°27′50″N 48°26′11″E
- Country: Iran
- Province: Lorestan
- County: Khorramabad
- District: Central
- Rural District: Dehpir-e Jonubi

Population (2016)
  - Total: 1,266
- Time zone: UTC+3:30 (IRST)

Kamalvand-e Gholam Ali (Persian: كمالوندغلامعلي) (Note: Also romanized as Kamālvand-e Gholām ʿAlī; also known as Kamālvand, Kamalvand-e Golamali, and Kamālvand-e Golām‘alī) is a village in, and the capital of, Dehpir-e Jonubi Rural District (Note: Formerly Dehpir Rural District) in the Central District of Khorramabad County, Lorestan province, Iran.

== Demographics ==
=== Population ===
At the time of the 2006 National Census, the village's population was 717 in 172 households. The following census in 2011 counted 1,042 people in 287 households. The 2016 census measured the population of the village as 1,266 people in 379 households, the most populous in its rural district.
