= Kahriz-e Hajji Morad Khan =

Kahriz-e Hajji Morad Khan كهريزحاجي مرادخان
- Village
- Location within Iran
- Coordinates: 34°52′41″N 47°15′30″E
- Country: Iran
- Province: Kermanshah
- County: Sonqor
- Bakhsh: Kolyai
- Rural District: Kivanat

Population (2006)
  - Total: 97
- Time zone: UTC+3:30 (IRST)
  - Summer (DST): UTC+4:30 (IRDT)

Kahriz-e Hajji Morad Khan (Persian: كهريزحاجي مرادخان, also Romanized as Kahrīz-e Ḩājjī Morād Khān; also known as Kahrīz) is a village in Kivanat Rural District, Kolyai District, Sonqor County, Kermanshah Province, Iran. At the 2006 census, its population was 97, in 26 families.
