= Khong Kamalvand =

Khong Kamalvand خنگ كمال وند
- Village
- Location within Iran
- Coordinates: 31°56′36″N 49°50′02″E
- Country: Iran
- Province: Khuzestan
- County: Izeh
- Bakhsh: Central
- Rural District: Howmeh-ye Gharbi

Population (2006)
  - Total: 529
- Time zone: UTC+3:30 (IRST)
  - Summer (DST): UTC+4:30 (IRDT)

Khong Kamalvand (Persian: خنگ كمال وند, also Romanized as Khong Kamālvand; also known as Kamālvand) is a village in Howmeh-ye Gharbi Rural District, in the Central District of Izeh County, Khuzestan Province, Iran. At the 2006 census, its population was 529, in 84 families.
