= Kahriz-e Baba Hoseyn =

Kahriz-e Baba Hoseyn كهريزباباحسين
- Village
- Location within Iran
- Coordinates: 35°32′02″N 47°56′25″E
- Country: Iran
- Province: Hamadan
- County: Kabudarahang
- Bakhsh: Gol Tappeh
- Rural District: Mehraban-e Sofla

Population (2006)
  - Total: 381
- Time zone: UTC+3:30 (IRST)
  - Summer (DST): UTC+4:30 (IRDT)

Kahriz-e Baba Hoseyn (Persian: كهريزباباحسين, also Romanized as Kahrīz-e Bābā Ḩoseyn; also known as Kahrīz, Kahrīz-e Bābā Ḩoseynī, Kārīz, and Kārīz-e Bābā Ḩoseynī) is a village in Mehraban-e Sofla Rural District, Gol Tappeh District, Kabudarahang County, Hamadan Province, Iran. At the 2006 census, its population was 381, in 84 families.
