= Kalateh-ye Said, South Khorasan =

Kalateh-ye Said كلاته سعيد
- Village
- Location within Iran
- Coordinates: 33°41′00″N 58°56′57″E
- Country: Iran
- Province: South Khorasan
- County: Qaen
- Bakhsh: Central
- Rural District: Qaen

Population (2006)
  - Total: 133
- Time zone: UTC+3:30 (IRST)
  - Summer (DST): UTC+4:30 (IRDT)

Kalateh-ye Said (Persian: كلاته سعيد, also Romanized as Kalāteh-ye Sa‘īd) is a village in Qaen Rural District, in the Central District of Qaen County, South Khorasan Province, Iran. At the 2006 census, its population was 133, in 42 families.
