= Kahriz-e Kur Bolagh =

Kahriz-e Kur Bolagh كهريزكوربلاغ
- Village
- Location within Iran
- Coordinates: 34°28′04″N 46°48′42″E
- Country: Iran
- Province: Kermanshah
- County: Kermanshah
- Bakhsh: Central
- Rural District: Baladarband

Population (2006)
  - Total: 78
- Time zone: UTC+3:30 (IRST)
  - Summer (DST): UTC+4:30 (IRDT)

Kahriz-e Kur Bolagh (Persian: كهريزكوربلاغ, also Romanized as Kahrīz-e Kūr Bolāgh; also known as Kahrīz-e Kūrbolāghī) is a village in Baladarband Rural District, in the Central District of Kermanshah County, Kermanshah Province, Iran. At the 2006 census, its population was 78, in 21 families.
