= Kariz Darreh =

Kariz Darreh كاريزدره
- Village
- Location within Iran
- Coordinates: 35°37′01″N 60°39′41″E
- Country: Iran
- Province: Razavi Khorasan
- County: Torbat-e Jam
- Bakhsh: Central
- Rural District: Jolgeh-ye Musaabad

Population (2006)
  - Total: 244
- Time zone: UTC+3:30 (IRST)
  - Summer (DST): UTC+4:30 (IRDT)

Kariz Darreh (Persian: كاريزدره, also Romanized as Kārīz Darreh) is a village in Jolgeh-ye Musaabad Rural District, in the Central District of Torbat-e Jam County, Razavi Khorasan Province, Iran. At the 2006 census, its population was 244, in 56 families.
