= Pa Qaleh, Fars =

Pa Qaleh پاقلعه
- Village
- Location within Iran
- Coordinates: 30°00′09″N 52°01′34″E
- Country: Iran
- Province: Fars
- County: Mamasani
- Bakhsh: Doshman Ziari
- Rural District: Doshman Ziari

Population (2006)
  - Total: 159
- Time zone: UTC+3:30 (IRST)
  - Summer (DST): UTC+4:30 (IRDT)

Pa Qaleh (Persian: پاقلعه, also Romanized as Pā Qal‘eh; also known as Qal‘eh-ye Āqākhān) is a village in Doshman Ziari Rural District, Doshman Ziari District, Mamasani County, Fars province, Iran. At the 2006 census, its population was 159, in 52 families.
