= Kamalvand, Hamadan =

Kamalvand كمال وند
- Village
- Location within Iran
- Coordinates: 34°13′47″N 48°05′18″E
- Country: Iran
- Province: Hamadan
- County: Nahavand
- Bakhsh: Khezel
- Rural District: Solgi

Population (2006)
  - Total: 131
- Time zone: UTC+3:30 (IRST)
  - Summer (DST): UTC+4:30 (IRDT)

Kamalvand (Persian: كمال وند, also Romanized as Kamālvand) is a village in Solgi Rural District, Khezel District, Nahavand County, Hamadan Province, Iran. At the 2006 census, its population was 131, in 32 families.
