= Kalateh-ye Khan, Nehbandan =

Kalateh-ye Khan كلاته خان
- Village
- Location within Iran
- Coordinates: 31°52′08″N 59°53′50″E
- Country: Iran
- Province: South Khorasan
- County: Nehbandan
- Bakhsh: Central
- Rural District: Neh

Population (2006)
  - Total: 67
- Time zone: UTC+3:30 (IRST)
  - Summer (DST): UTC+4:30 (IRDT)

Kalateh-ye Khan (Persian: كلاته خان, also Romanized as Kalāteh-ye Khān; also known as Kalāt-ye Khān and Kalāt-e Jān Maḩmūd) is a village in Neh Rural District, in the Central District of Nehbandan County, South Khorasan Province, Iran. At the 2006 census, its population was 67, in 13 families.
