= Pa Qaleh, Kermanshah =

Pa Qaleh پاقلعه
- Village
- Location within Iran
- Coordinates: 34°27′39″N 47°35′30″E
- Country: Iran
- Province: Kermanshah
- County: Sahneh
- Bakhsh: Central
- Rural District: Hojr

Population (2006)
  - Total: 189
- Time zone: UTC+3:30 (IRST)
  - Summer (DST): UTC+4:30 (IRDT)

Pa Qaleh or Pa Qalla (Persian: پاقلعه, Southern Kurdish: پاقەڵا, Paqeĺa, also Romanized as Pā Qal‘eh) is a village in Hojr Rural District, in the Central District of Sahneh County, Kermanshah Province, Iran. At the 2006 census, its population was 189, in 42 families.
