= Dowlatabad, Razavi Khorasan =

City in Razavi Khorasan province, Iran

Dowlatabad Persian: دولت آباد
- City
- Location within Iran
- Coordinates: 35°17′03″N 59°31′21″E
- Country: Iran
- Province: Razavi Khorasan
- County: Zaveh
- District: Central

Population (2016)
  - Total: 9,329
- Time zone: UTC+3:30 (IRST)

Dowlatabad (Persian: دولت آباد) (Note: Also romanized as Dowlatābād and Dowlatâbâd; also known as Daulatābad) is a city in the Central District of Zaveh County, Razavi Khorasan province, Iran, serving as capital of both the county and the district. It is also the administrative center for Safaiyeh Rural District.

== Demographics ==
=== Population ===
At the time of the 2006 National Census, the city's population was 8,740 in 2,334 households, when it was capital of the former Jolgeh Zaveh District in Torbat-e Heydarieh County. The following census in 2011 counted 9,606 people in 2,721 households, by which time the district had been separated from the county in the establishment of Zaveh County. Dowlatabad was transferred to the new Central District as the county's capital. The 2016 census measured the population of the city as 9,329 people in 2,939 households.
