= Kahriz-e Sofla =

Village in Kermanshah, Iran

Kahriz-e Sofla كهريزسفلي
- Village
- Location within Iran
- Coordinates: 34°07′38″N 47°02′39″E
- Country: Iran
- Province: Kermanshah
- County: Kermanshah
- Bakhsh: Firuzabad
- Rural District: Sar Firuzabad

Population (2006)
  - Total: 168
- Time zone: UTC+3:30 (IRST)
  - Summer (DST): UTC+4:30 (IRDT)

Kahriz-e Sofla (Persian: كهريزسفلي, also Romanized as Kahrīz-e Soflá) is a village in Sar Firuzabad Rural District, Firuzabad District, Kermanshah County, Kermanshah Province, Iran. At the 2006 census, its population was 168, in 33 families.
