= Kalateh-ye Khan, Qaen =

Kalateh-ye Khan كلاته خان
- Village
- Location within Iran
- Coordinates: 33°41′54″N 59°06′58″E
- Country: Iran
- Province: South Khorasan
- County: Qaen
- Bakhsh: Central
- Rural District: Qaen

Population (2006)
  - Total: 322
- Time zone: UTC+3:30 (IRST)
  - Summer (DST): UTC+4:30 (IRDT)

Kalateh-ye Khan (Persian: كلاته خان, also Romanized as Kalāteh-ye Khān and Kalāteh-i-Khān; also known as Kalāt-e Khān and Ākbarīyeh) is a village in Qaen Rural District, in the Central District of Qaen County, South Khorasan Province, Iran. At the 2006 census, its population was 322, in 90 families.
