= Pa Qaleh-ye Khoskheh Rud =

Pa Qaleh-ye Khoskheh Rud پاقلعه خشكه رود
- Village
- Interactive map of Pa Qaleh-ye Khoskheh Rud
- Country: Iran
- Province: Kermanshah
- County: Kermanshah
- Bakhsh: Firuzabad
- Rural District: Osmanvand

Population (2006)
  - Total: 45
- Time zone: UTC+3:30 (IRST)
  - Summer (DST): UTC+4:30 (IRDT)

Pa Qaleh-ye Khoskheh Rud (Persian: پاقلعه خشكه رود, also Romanized as Pā Qal‘eh-ye Khoshkeh Rūd) is a village in Osmanvand Rural District, Firuzabad District, Kermanshah County, Kermanshah Province, Iran. At the 2006 census, its population was 45, in 9 families.
