= Kahrizak, Malard =

Kahrizak كهريزك
- village
- Location within Iran
- Coordinates: 35°41′05″N 50°53′18″E
- Country: Iran
- Province: Tehran
- County: Malard
- Bakhsh: Central
- Rural District: Bibi Sakineh

Population (2006)
  - Total: 389
- Time zone: UTC+3:30 (IRST)
  - Summer (DST): UTC+4:30 (IRDT)

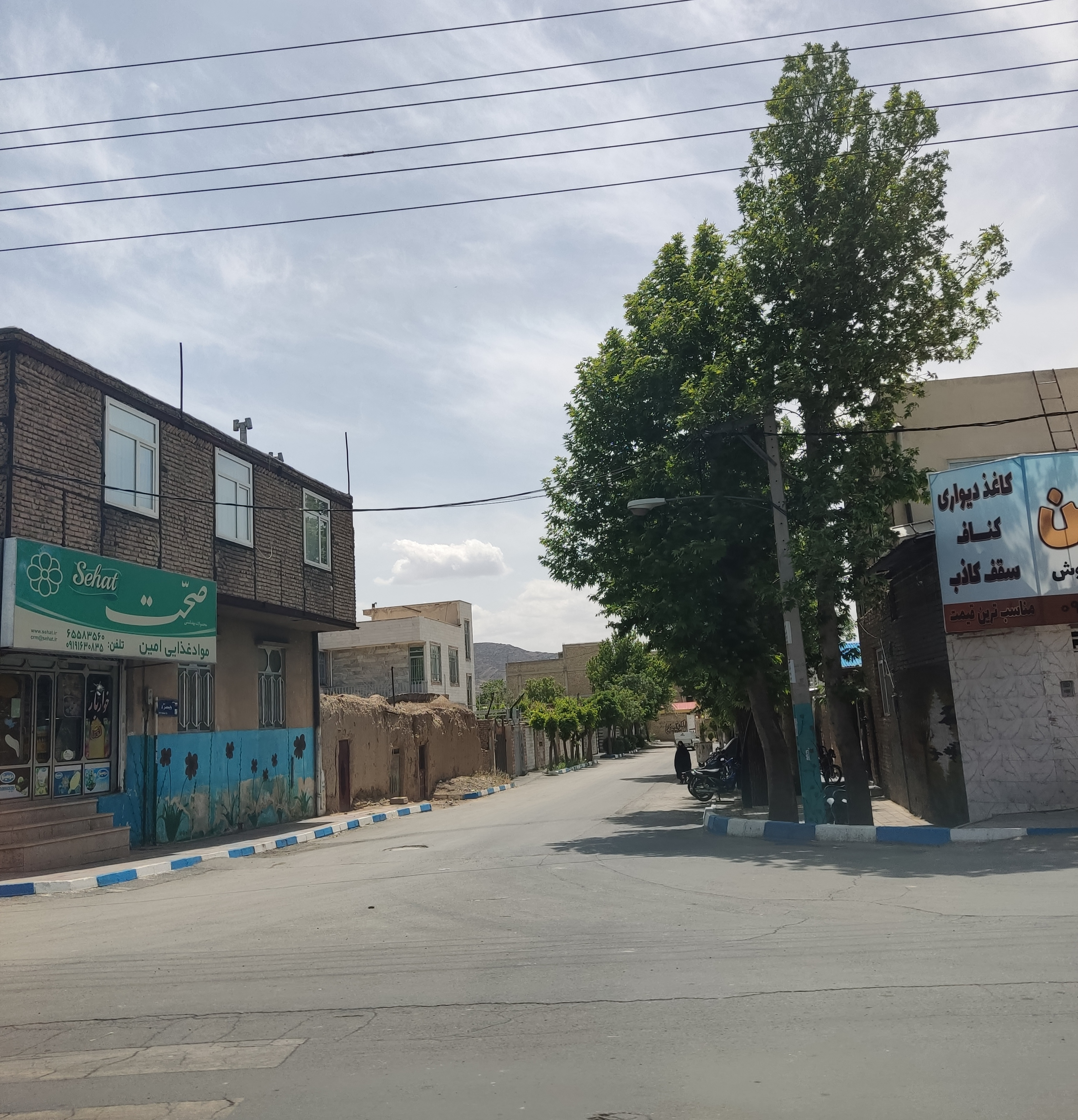
Kahrizak, Malard, Tehran Province, Iran. (2022)

Kahrizak (Persian: كهريزك, also Romanized as Kahrīzak) is a village in Bibi Sakineh Rural District, in the Central District of Malard County, Tehran Province, Iran. At the 2006 census, its population was 389, in 96 families.
