= Hafezabad, Khash =

Hafezabad حافظ اباد
- Village
- Location within Iran
- Coordinates: 28°22′20″N 60°29′12″E
- Country: Iran
- Province: Sistan and Baluchestan
- County: Khash
- Bakhsh: Nukabad
- Rural District: Gowhar Kuh

Population (2006)
  - Total: 45
- Time zone: UTC+3:30 (IRST)
  - Summer (DST): UTC+4:30 (IRDT)

Hafezabad (Persian: حافظ اباد, also Romanized as Ḩāfez̧ābād) is a village in Gowhar Kuh Rural District, Nukabad District, Khash County, Sistan and Baluchestan Province, Iran. At the 2006 census, its population was 45, in 8 families.
