= Kariz-e Bedaq =

Kariz-e Bedaq كاريزبداق
- Village
- Location within Iran
- Coordinates: 35°30′46″N 60°00′07″E
- Country: Iran
- Province: Razavi Khorasan
- County: Fariman
- Bakhsh: Qalandarabad
- Rural District: Qalandarabad

Population (2006)
  - Total: 111
- Time zone: UTC+3:30 (IRST)
  - Summer (DST): UTC+4:30 (IRDT)

Kariz-e Bedaq (Persian: كاريزبداق, also Romanized as Kārīz-e Bedāq and Kārīz-e Bedāgh) is a village in Qalandarabad Rural District, Qalandarabad District, Fariman County, Razavi Khorasan Province, Iran. At the 2006 census, its population was 111, in 27 families.
