= Kahriz-e Qaleh Daresi =

Kahriz-e Qaleh Daresi كهريزقلعه درسي
- Village
- Location within Iran
- Coordinates: 39°13′15″N 44°34′51″E
- Country: Iran
- Province: West Azerbaijan
- County: Maku
- Bakhsh: Central
- Rural District: Chaybasar-e Jonubi

Population (2006)
  - Total: 124
- Time zone: UTC+3:30 (IRST)
  - Summer (DST): UTC+4:30 (IRDT)

Kahriz-e Qaleh Daresi (Persian: كهريزقلعه درسي, also Romanized as Kahrīz-e Qal‘eh Daresī; also known as Kahrīz) is a village in Chaybasar-e Jonubi Rural District, in the Central District of Maku County, West Azerbaijan Province, Iran. At the 2006 census, its population was 124, in 23 families.
