= Kahriz, Salmas =

Kahriz كهريز
- Village
- Location within Iran
- Coordinates: 38°05′54″N 44°34′20″E
- Country: Iran
- Province: West Azerbaijan
- County: Salmas
- Bakhsh: Kuhsar
- Rural District: Chahriq

Population (2006)
  - Total: 354
- Time zone: UTC+3:30 (IRST)
  - Summer (DST): UTC+4:30 (IRDT)

Kahriz (Persian: كهريز, also Romanized as Kahrīz, Armenian: Քահրես) is a village in Chahriq Rural District, Kuhsar District, Salmas County, West Azerbaijan Province, Iran. At the 2006 census, its population was 354, in 64 families.
