= Amirabad-e Pain =

Amirabad-e Pain (Persian: اميرابادپايين) may refer to:

- Amirabad-e Pain, Kerman
- Amirabad-e Pain, alternate name of Amirabad, Anbarabad, Kerman Province
- Amirabad-e Pain, Kohgiluyeh and Boyer-Ahmad
- Amirabad-e Pain, South Khorasan
