= Kahriz, Khorramabad =

Village in Lorestan province, Iran

Kahriz Persian: كهريز
- Village
- Location within Iran
- Coordinates: 33°28′30″N 48°23′54″E
- Country: Iran
- Province: Lorestan
- County: Khorramabad
- District: Central
- Rural District: Dehpir-e Jonubi

Population (2016)
  - Total: 565
- Time zone: UTC+3:30 (IRST)

Kahriz (Persian: كهريز) (Note: Also romanized as Kahrīz; also known as Kahrīz-e Kamālvand) is a village in Dehpir-e Jonubi Rural District (Note: Formerly Dehpir Rural District) of the Central District in Khorramabad County, Lorestan province, Iran.

== Demographics ==
=== Population ===
At the time of the 2006 National Census, the village's population was 525 in 116 households. The following census in 2011 counted 580 people in 151 households. The 2016 census measured the population of the village as 565 people in 159 households.
