= Kahriz-e Bid Sorkh =

Kahriz-e Bid Sorkh كهريزبيدسرخ
- Village
- Location within Iran
- Coordinates: 34°25′32″N 47°51′51″E
- Country: Iran
- Province: Kermanshah
- County: Kangavar
- Bakhsh: Central
- Rural District: Khezel-e Gharbi

Population (2006)
  - Total: 36
- Time zone: UTC+3:30 (IRST)
  - Summer (DST): UTC+4:30 (IRDT)

Kahriz-e Bid Sorkh (Persian: كهريزبيدسرخ, also Romanized as Kahrīz-e Bīd Sorkh; also known as Kahrīz) is a village in Khezel-e Gharbi Rural District, in the Central District of Kangavar County, Kermanshah Province, Iran. At the 2006 census, its population was 36, in 9 families.
