= Karizak-e Kohneh =

Karizak-e Kohneh كاريزك كهنه
- Village
- Location within Iran
- Coordinates: 36°08′45″N 58°50′22″E
- Country: Iran
- Province: Razavi Khorasan
- County: Nishapur
- Bakhsh: Central
- Rural District: Darbqazi

Population (2006)
  - Total: 159
- Time zone: UTC+3:30 (IRST)
  - Summer (DST): UTC+4:30 (IRDT)

Karizak-e Kohneh (Persian: كاريزك كهنه, also Romanized as Kārīzak-e Kohneh) is a village in Darbqazi Rural District, in the Central District of Nishapur County, Razavi Khorasan Province, Iran. At the 2006 census, its population was 159, in 40 families.
