= Kahriz-e Qaleh Kohneh =

Kahriz-e Qaleh Kohneh كهريزقلعه كهنه
- Village
- Location within Iran
- Coordinates: 34°23′02″N 47°03′19″E
- Country: Iran
- Province: Kermanshah
- County: Kermanshah
- Bakhsh: Central
- Rural District: Baladarband

Population (2006)
  - Total: 480
- Time zone: UTC+3:30 (IRST)
  - Summer (DST): UTC+4:30 (IRDT)

Kahriz-e Qaleh Kohneh (Persian: كهريزقلعه كهنه, also Romanized as Kahrīz-e Qal‘eh Kohneh; also known as Kahrīz) is a village in Baladarband Rural District, in the Central District of Kermanshah County, Kermanshah Province, Iran. At the 2006 census, its population was 480, in 114 families.
