= Safaiyeh Rural District =

Rural district in Razavi Khorasan province, Iran

Safaiyeh Rural District Persian: دهستان صفائيه
- Rural District
- Location within Iran
- Coordinates: 35°19′N 59°39′E
- Country: Iran
- Province: Razavi Khorasan
- County: Zaveh
- District: Central
- Established: 1987
- Capital: Dowlatabad.

Population (2016)
  - Total: 13,087
- Time zone: UTC+3:30 (IRST)

Safaiyeh Rural District (Persian: دهستان صفائيه) is in the Central District of Zaveh County, Razavi Khorasan province, Iran. It is administered from the city of Dowlatabad.

== Demographics ==
=== Population ===
At the time of the 2006 National Census, the rural district's population (as a part of the former Jolgeh Zaveh District in Torbat-e Heydarieh County) was 12,711 in 2,936 households. There were 14,057 inhabitants in 3,801 households at the following census of 2011, by which time the district had been separated from the county in the establishment of Zaveh County. The rural district was transferred to the new Central District. The 2016 census measured the population of the rural district as 13,087 in 3,902 households. The most populous of its 26 villages was Safiabad, with 4,410 people.

=== Other villages in the rural district ===
- Aliabad
- Borzu
- Marghzar
- Petrow
- Sadabad
