= Dehpir-e Jonubi Rural District =

Rural district in Lorestan province, Iran

Dehpir-e Jonubi Rural District Persian: دهستان ده پير جنوبي
- Rural District
- Location within Iran
- Coordinates: 33°28′07″N 48°27′45″E
- Country: Iran
- Province: Lorestan
- County: Khorramabad
- District: Central
- Established: 1987
- Capital: Kamalvand-e Gholam Ali

Population (2016)
  - Total: 10,258
- Time zone: UTC+3:30 (IRST)

Dehpir-e Jonubi Rural District (Persian: دهستان ده پير جنوبي) (Note: Formerly Dehpir Rural District (دهستان ده پير)) is in the Central District of Khorramabad County, Lorestan province, Iran. Its capital is the village of Kamalvand-e Gholam Ali.

== Demographics ==
=== Population ===
At the time of the 2006 National Census, the rural district's population was 7,479 in 1,696 households. There were 9,659 inhabitants in 2,293 households at the following census of 2011. The 2016 census measured the population of the rural district as 10,258 in 2,540 households. The most populous of its 35 villages was Kamalvand-e Gholam Ali, with 1,266 people.

=== Other villages in the rural district ===
- Kahriz
- Kahriz-e Jadid
- Kamalvand-e Mohammad Hasan Parvaneh
- Lorestan University
- Malekabad
- Sarab-e Pardeh Chahi
