= Soleyman Rural District =

Rural district in Razavi Khorasan province, Iran

Soleyman Rural District Persian: دهستان سليمان
- Rural District
- Location within Iran
- Coordinates: 35°18′N 59°51′E
- Country: Iran
- Province: Razavi Khorasan
- County: Zaveh
- District: Soleyman
- Established: 1987
- Capital: Chakhmaq

Population (2016)
  - Total: 12,835
- Time zone: UTC+3:30 (IRST)

Soleyman Rural District (Persian: دهستان سليمان) is in Soleyman District of Zaveh County, Razavi Khorasan province, Iran. Its capital is the village of Chakhmaq.

== Demographics ==
=== Population ===
At the time of the 2006 National Census, the rural district's population (as a part of the former Jolgeh Zaveh District in Torbat-e Heydarieh County) was 27,332 in 6,261 households. There were 14,708 inhabitants in 3,907 households at the following census of 2011, by which time the district had been separated from the county in the establishment of Zaveh County. The rural district was transferred to the new Soleyman District. The 2016 census measured the population of the rural district as 12,835 in 3,597 households. The most populous of its 52 villages was Chakhmaq, with 1,780 people.

=== Other villages in the rural district ===
- Aleyak
- Jafarabad
- Qaleh Now-ye Safiabad
- Sar Galan
- Shahin-e Olya
- Shahvar
- Zharf
