= Soleyman District =

District in Razavi Khorasan province, Iran

Soleyman District Persian: بخش سليمان
- District
- Location within Iran
- Coordinates: 35°13′N 59°51′E
- Country: Iran
- Province: Razavi Khorasan
- County: Zaveh
- Established: 2008
- Capital: Chakhmaq

Population (2016)
  - Total: 29,307
- Time zone: UTC+3:30 (IRST)

Soleyman District (Persian: بخش سليمان) is in Zaveh County, Razavi Khorasan province, Iran. Its capital is the village of Chakhmaq.

== History ==
In 2008, Jolgeh Zaveh District was separated from Torbat-e Heydarieh County in the establishment of Zaveh County, which was divided into two districts of two rural districts each, with Dowlatabad as its capital and only city at the time.

== Demographics ==
=== Population ===
At the time of the 2011 National Census, the district's population was 30,855 people in 8,352 households. The 2016 census measured the population of the district as 29,307 inhabitants in 8,412 households.

=== Administrative divisions ===
Soleyman District Population
Administrative Divisions	2011	2016
Saq RD	16,147	16,472
Soleyman RD	14,708	12,835
Total	30,855	29,307
RD = Rural District
