= Zaveh Rural District =

Rural district in Razavi Khorasan province, Iran

Zaveh Rural District Persian: دهستان زاوه
- Rural District
- Location within Iran
- Coordinates: 35°20′N 59°29′E
- Country: Iran
- Province: Razavi Khorasan
- County: Zaveh
- District: Central
- Established: 1987
- Capital: Karizak-e Nagahani

Population (2016)
  - Total: 15,968
- Time zone: UTC+3:30 (IRST)

Zaveh Rural District (Persian: دهستان زاوه) is in the Central District of Zaveh County, Razavi Khorasan province, Iran. Its capital is the village of Karizak-e Nagahani.

== Demographics ==
=== Population ===
At the time of the 2006 National Census, the rural district's population (as a part of the former Jolgeh Zaveh District in Torbat-e Heydarieh County) was 17,423 in 4,287 households. There were 17,038 inhabitants in 4,858 households at the following census of 2011, by which time the district had been separated from the county in the establishment of Zaveh County. The rural district was transferred to the new Central District. The 2016 census measured the population of the rural district as 15,968 in 4,808 households. The most populous of its 70 villages was Karizak-e Nagahani, with 2,920 people.

=== Other villages in the rural district ===
- Golsara
- Hajjiabad
- Kalateh-ye Zanganeh
- Qaleh Ney
- Shahnabad
- Zaveh
