= Jolgeh Zaveh District =

Former district in Razavi Khorasan province, Iran

Jolgeh Zaveh District Persian: بخش جلگه زاوه
- Former District
- Location within Iran
- Coordinates: 35°15′N 59°43′E
- Country: Iran
- Province: Razavi Khorasan
- County: Torbat-e Heydarieh
- Capital: Dowlatabad

Population (2006)
  - Total: 66,206
- Time zone: UTC+3:30 (IRST)

Jolgeh Zaveh District (Persian: بخش جلگه زاوه) is a former administrative division of Torbat-e Heydarieh County, Razavi Khorasan province, Iran. Its capital was the city of Dowlatabad.

== History ==
In 2008, the district was separated from the county in the establishment of Zaveh County.

== Demographics ==
=== Population ===
At the time of the 2006 census, the rural district's population was 66,206 in 15,818 households.

=== Administrative divisions ===
Jolgeh Zaveh District Population
Administrative Divisions	2006
Safaiyeh RD	12,711
Soleyman RD	27,332
Zaveh RD	17,423
Dowlatabad (city)	8,740
Total	66,206
RD = Rural District
