= Central District (Zaveh County) =

District in Razavi Khorasan province, Iran

Central District (Zaveh County) Persian: بخش مرکزی شهرستان زاوه
- District
- Location within Iran
- Coordinates: 35°20′N 59°33′E
- Country: Iran
- Province: Razavi Khorasan
- County: Zaveh
- Established: 2008
- Capital: Dowlatabad

Population (2016)
  - Total: 38,384
- Time zone: UTC+3:30 (IRST)

The Central District of Zaveh County (Persian: بخش مرکزی شهرستان زاوه) is in Razavi Khorasan province, Iran. Its capital is the city of Dowlatabad.

== History ==
In 2008, Jolgeh Zaveh District was separated from Torbat-e Heydarieh County in the establishment of Zaveh County, which was divided into two districts of two rural districts each, with Dowlatabad as its capital and only city at the time.

== Demographics ==
=== Population ===
At the time of the 2011 National Census, the district's population was 40,701 people in 11,380 households. The 2016 census measured the population of the district as 38,384 inhabitants in 11,649 households.

=== Administrative divisions ===
Central District (Zaveh County) Population
Administrative Divisions	2011	2016
Safaiyeh RD	14,057	13,087
Zaveh RD	17,038	15,968
Dowlatabad (city)	9,606	9,329
Total	40,701	38,384
RD = Rural District
