= Zaveh County =

County in Razavi Khorasan province, Iran

Zaveh County Persian: شهرستان زاوه
- County
- Location of Zaveh County in Razavi Khorasan province (center right, green)

- Location of Razavi Khorasan province in Iran
- Coordinates: 35°15′N 59°43′E
- Country: Iran
- Province: Razavi Khorasan
- Established: 2008
- Capital: Dowlatabad
- Districts: Central, Soleyman

Area
  - Total: 2,575 km^{2} (994 sq mi)
- Elevation: 1,750 m (5,740 ft)

Population (2016)
  - Total: 67,695
- Time zone: UTC+3:30 (IRST)

Zaveh County (Persian: شهرستان زاوه) (Note: Also romanized as Šahrestâne Zave) is in Razavi Khorasan province, Iran. Its capital is the city of Dowlatabad.

== History ==
In 2008, Jolgeh Zaveh District was separated from Torbat-e Heydarieh County in the establishment of Zaveh County, which was divided into two districts of two rural districts each, with Dowlatabad as its capital and only city at the time.

== Demographics ==
=== Population ===
At the time of the 2011 National Census, the county's population was 71,677 people in 19,743 households. The 2016 census measured the population of the county as 67,695 in 20,063 households.

=== Administrative divisions ===
Zaveh County's population history and administrative structure over two consecutive censuses are shown in the following table.

Zaveh County Population
Administrative Divisions	2011	2016
Central District	40,701	38,384
Safaiyeh RD	14,057	13,087
Zaveh RD	17,038	15,968
Dowlatabad (city)	9,606	9,329
Soleyman District	30,855	29,307
Saq RD	16,147	16,472
Soleyman RD	14,708	12,835
Total	71,677	67,695
RD = Rural District

== See also ==
Media related to Zaveh County at Wikimedia Commons
