= Mehragan, Iran =

Mehragan or Mehregan or Mehrgan (Persian: مهرگان), also rendered as Mehrakan, may refer to:

- Mehregan, Isfahan
- Mehregan, Kerman
- Mehregan, Kermanshah
- Mehregan, Qazvin
- Mehragan-e Bala
- Mehragan-e Pain
- Mehregan Rural District, in Hormozgan Province
