= Tonb =

Tonb may refer to:

- TonB, see Outer Membrane Receptor
- Tonb Baluchan, Iran
- Tonb Bariku, Iran
- Tonb Basat, Iran
- Tonb-e Khvajeh Bahman, Iran
- Tunb (disambiguation), places in Iran
