= Siah Tak =

Siah Tak سياتك
- Village
- Location within Iran
- Coordinates: 27°01′45″N 55°11′05″E
- Country: Iran
- Province: Hormozgan
- County: Bandar Lengeh
- Bakhsh: Central
- Rural District: Dezhgan

Population (2006)
  - Total: 87
- Time zone: UTC+3:30 (IRST)
  - Summer (DST): UTC+4:30 (IRDT)

Siah Tak (Persian: سياتك, also Romanized as Sīāh Tak) is a village in Dezhgan Rural District, in the Central District of Bandar Lengeh County, Hormozgan Province, Iran. At the 2006 census, its population was 87, in 19 families.
