= Javoni =

Javoni جاوني
- Village
- Location within Iran
- Coordinates: 26°50′52″N 54°16′05″E
- Country: Iran
- Province: Hormozgan
- County: Bandar Lengeh
- Bakhsh: Shibkaveh
- Rural District: Bandar Charak

Population (2006)
  - Total: 137
- Time zone: UTC+3:30 (IRST)
  - Summer (DST): UTC+4:30 (IRDT)

Javoni (Persian: جاوني, also Romanized as Jāvonī and Jāvanī) is a village in Bandar Charak Rural District, Shibkaveh District, Bandar Lengeh County, Hormozgan Province, Iran. At the 2006 census, its population was 137, in 22 families.
