= Dam Hara =

Dam Hara دم هرا
- Village
- Location within Iran
- Coordinates: 26°56′52″N 55°01′00″E
- Country: Iran
- Province: Hormozgan
- County: Bandar Lengeh
- Bakhsh: Central
- Rural District: Mehran

Population (2006)
  - Total: 151
- Time zone: UTC+3:30 (IRST)
  - Summer (DST): UTC+4:30 (IRDT)

Dam Hara (Persian: دم هرا, also Romanized as Dam Harā; also known as Dam Harā’ī and Dam Havā’ī) is a village in Mehran Rural District, in the Central District of Bandar Lengeh County, Hormozgan province, Iran. At the 2006 census, its population was 151, in 30 families.
