= Bardeghun =

Bardeghun بردغون
- Village
- Location within Iran
- Coordinates: 26°37′25″N 54°54′37″E
- Country: Iran
- Province: Hormozgan
- County: Bandar Lengeh
- Bakhsh: Central
- Rural District: Howmeh

Population (2006)
  - Total: 8
- Time zone: UTC+3:30 (IRST)
  - Summer (DST): UTC+4:30 (IRDT)

Bardeghun (Persian: بردغون, also Romanized as Bardeghūn) is a village in Howmeh Rural District, in the Central District of Bandar Lengeh County, Hormozgan Province, Iran. At the 2006 census, its population was 8, in 6 families.
