= Bandar-e Band-e Moallem =

Bandar-e Band-e Moallem, Iran بندربندمعلم
- Village
- Location within Iran
- Coordinates: 26°39′28″N 55°03′01″E
- Country: Iran
- Province: Hormozgan
- County: Bandar Lengeh
- Bakhsh: Central
- Rural District: Howmeh

Population (2006)
  - Total: 1,086
- Time zone: UTC+3:30 (IRST)
  - Summer (DST): UTC+4:30 (IRDT)

Bandar-e Band-e Moallem (Persian: بندربندمعلم, also Romanized as Bandar-e Band-e Mo‘allem; also known as Band-e Mavālīm, Band-e Mo‘allem, Band-i-Mu‘allim, and Band Mo‘allem) is a village in Howmeh Rural District, in the Central District of Bandar Lengeh County, Hormozgan Province, Iran. At the 2006 census, its population was 1,086, in 234 families.
