= Champah =

Champah چمپه
- Village
- Location within Iran
- Coordinates: 26°46′38″N 54°44′43″E
- Country: Iran
- Province: Hormozgan
- County: Bandar Lengeh
- Bakhsh: Central
- Rural District: Howmeh

Population (2006)
  - Total: 103
- Time zone: UTC+3:30 (IRST)
  - Summer (DST): UTC+4:30 (IRDT)

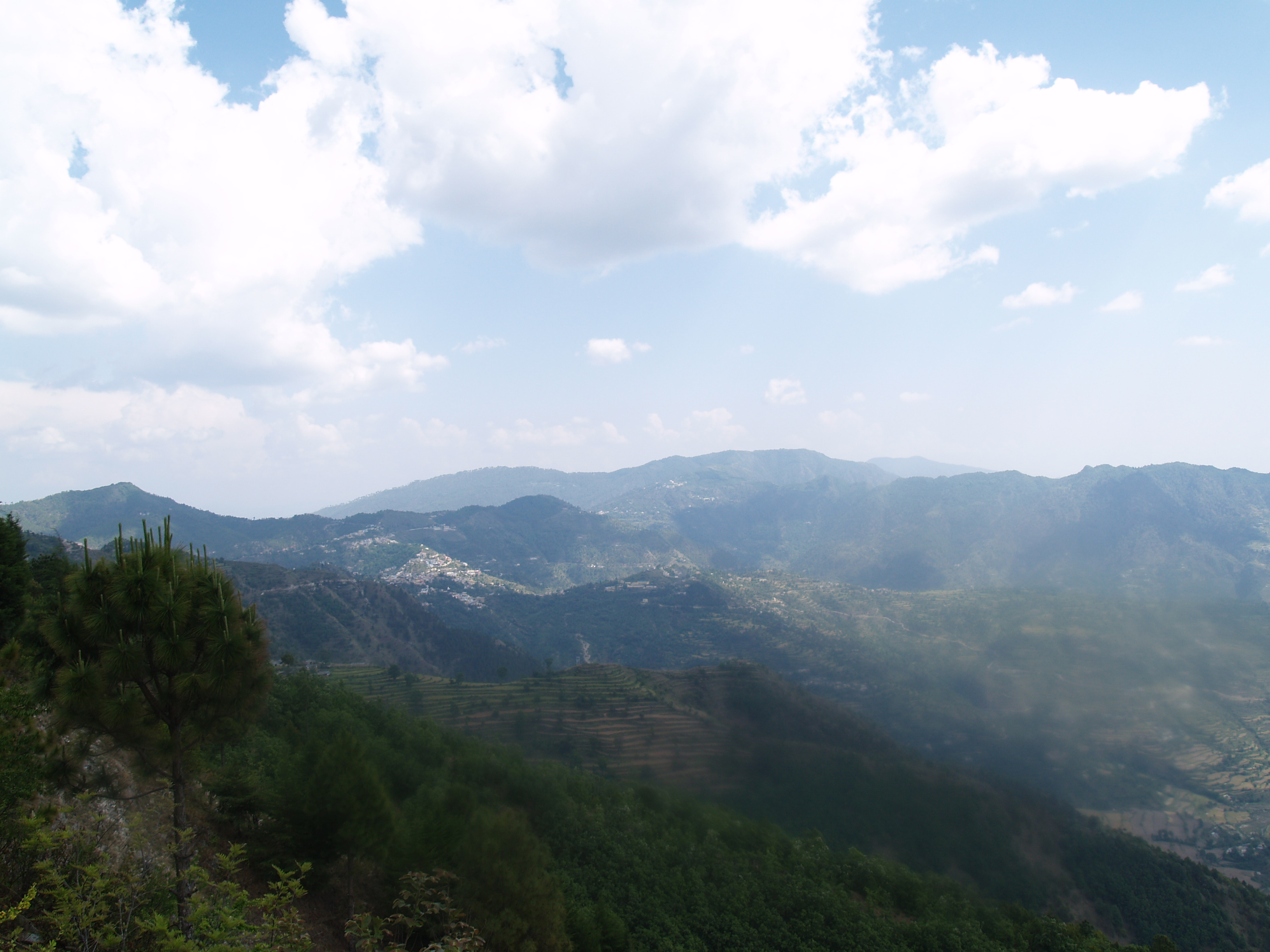
Chambah Valley

Champah (Persian: چمپه, also Romanized as Champeh) is a village in Howmeh Rural District, in the Central District of Bandar Lengeh County, Hormozgan Province, Iran. At the 2006 census, its population was 103, in 21 families.
