= Vadi Ahmad =

Vadi Ahmad وادي احمد
- Village
- Location within Iran
- Coordinates: 26°51′56″N 54°00′32″E
- Country: Iran
- Province: Hormozgan
- County: Bandar Lengeh
- Bakhsh: Shibkaveh
- Rural District: Bandar Charak

Population (2006)
  - Total: 57
- Time zone: UTC+3:30 (IRST)
  - Summer (DST): UTC+4:30 (IRDT)

Vadi Ahmad (Persian: وادي احمد, also Romanized as Vādī Aḩmad; also known as Vādīḩamad) is a village in Bandar Charak Rural District, Shibkaveh District, Bandar Lengeh County, Hormozgan Province, Iran. At the 2006 census, its population was 57, in 13 families.
