= Lalami =

Lalami لعلمي
- Village
- Location within Iran
- Coordinates: 26°51′09″N 54°00′19″E
- Country: Iran
- Province: Hormozgan
- County: Bandar Lengeh
- Bakhsh: Shibkaveh
- Rural District: Bandar Charak

Population (2006)
  - Total: 253
- Time zone: UTC+3:30 (IRST)
  - Summer (DST): UTC+4:30 (IRDT)

Lalami (Persian: لعلمي, also Romanized as La‘lamī) is a village in Bandar Charak Rural District, Shibkaveh District, Bandar Lengeh County, Hormozgan Province, Iran. At the 2006 census, its population was 253, in 49 families.
