= Barisimu =

Barisimu بريسيمو
- Village
- Location within Iran
- Coordinates: 26°36′40″N 54°40′26″E
- Country: Iran
- Province: Hormozgan
- County: Bandar Lengeh
- Bakhsh: Central
- Rural District: Howmeh

Population (2006)
  - Total: 77
- Time zone: UTC+3:30 (IRST)
  - Summer (DST): UTC+4:30 (IRDT)

Barisimu (Persian: بريسيمو, also Romanized as Barīsīmū and Bereysemū; also known as Bagharsūn, Barīnsamū, Biraismūn, Bi’r-e-Samūn, Bīr Samūn, and Rīsī Jān) is a village in Howmeh Rural District, in the Central District of Bandar Lengeh County, Hormozgan Province, Iran. At the 2006 census, its population was 77, in 14 families.
