= Seh Konar-e Olya =

Seh Konar-e Olya سه كنارعليا
- Village
- Location within Iran
- Coordinates: 26°50′11″N 54°13′30″E
- Country: Iran
- Province: Hormozgan
- County: Bandar Lengeh
- Bakhsh: Shibkaveh
- Rural District: Bandar Charak

Population (2006)
  - Total: 151
- Time zone: UTC+3:30 (IRST)
  - Summer (DST): UTC+4:30 (IRDT)

Seh Konar-e Olya (Persian: سه كنارعليا, also Romanized as Seh Konār-e ‘Olyā; also known as Sadd-e Konār-e ‘Olyā, Sadd-e Konār-e Soflá, Sadd Konār, Sad Konār, Seh Kenar, and Seh Konār) is a village in Bandar Charak Rural District, Shibkaveh District, Bandar Lengeh County, Hormozgan Province, Iran. At the 2006 census, its population was 151, in 27 families.
