= Khomokuh =

Khomokuh خومكو
- Village
- Location within Iran
- Coordinates: 26°58′20″N 55°10′52″E
- Country: Iran
- Province: Hormozgan
- County: Bandar Lengeh
- Bakhsh: Central
- Rural District: Dezhgan

Population (2006)
  - Total: 114
- Time zone: UTC+3:30 (IRST)
  - Summer (DST): UTC+4:30 (IRDT)

Khomokuh (Persian: خومكو, also Romanized as Khomokūh) is a village in Dezhgan Rural District, in the Central District of Bandar Lengeh County, Hormozgan Province, Iran. At the 2006 census, its population was 114, in 25 families.
