= Hasham =

Hasham or Hashem (Persian: حشم) may refer to:

- Hasham Balm
- Hasham Kuh
- Hasham-e Champeh
- Hasham-e Howdow

== See also ==
- Hashem (disambiguation) (name)
- Hashim (given name)
