= Garsur =

Garsur گرسور
- Village
- Location within Iran
- Coordinates: 26°55′19″N 55°03′40″E
- Country: Iran
- Province: Hormozgan
- County: Bandar Lengeh
- Bakhsh: Central
- Rural District: Mehran

Population (2006)
  - Total: 82
- Time zone: UTC+3:30 (IRST)
  - Summer (DST): UTC+4:30 (IRDT)

Garsur (Persian: گرسور, also Romanized as Garsūr) is a village in Mehran Rural District, in the Central District of Bandar Lengeh County, Hormozgan Province, Iran. At the 2006 census, its population was 82, in 20 families.
