= Chah Mosallam =

Chah Mosallam چاه مسلم
- Village
- Location within Iran
- Coordinates: 26°44′29″N 54°33′27″E
- Country: Iran
- Province: Hormozgan
- County: Bandar Lengeh
- Bakhsh: Central
- Rural District: Moghuyeh

Population (2006)
  - Total: 1,947
- Time zone: UTC+3:30 (IRST)
  - Summer (DST): UTC+4:30 (IRDT)

Chah Mosallam (Persian: چاه مسلم, also Romanized as Chāh Mosallam; also known as Chah-e Moslem and Chāh-i-Musallam) is a village in Moghuyeh Rural District, in the Central District of Bandar Lengeh County, Hormozgan Province, Iran. At the 2006 census, its population was 1,947, in 316 families.
