= Bandar-e Micha-il =

Bandar-e Micha-il بندرميچائيل
- Village
- Location within Iran
- Coordinates: 26°49′09″N 53°32′29″E
- Country: Iran
- Province: Hormozgan
- County: Bandar Lengeh
- Bakhsh: Shibkaveh
- Rural District: Moqam

Population (2006)
  - Total: 95
- Time zone: UTC+3:30 (IRST)
  - Summer (DST): UTC+4:30 (IRDT)

Bandar-e Micha-il (Persian: بندرميچائيل, also Romanized as Bandar-e Mīchā-īl; also known as Bandar-e Machāhīr, Macha Hīl, Machāhīr, Majāhīl, Makahil, Mīchāhīl, Micha-il, Mūchāhīl, and Nachāḩīl) is a village in Moqam Rural District, Shibkaveh District, Bandar Lengeh County, Hormozgan Province, Iran. At the 2006 census, its population was 95, in 16 families.
