= Vadiabad =

Vadiabad وادئ آباد
- Village
- Location within Iran
- Coordinates: 26°51′06″N 54°01′49″E
- Country: Iran
- Province: Hormozgan
- County: Bandar Lengeh
- Bakhsh: Shibkaveh
- Rural District: Bandar Charak

Population (2006)
  - Total: 35
- Time zone: UTC+3:30 (IRST)
  - Summer (DST): UTC+4:30 (IRDT)

Vadiabad (Persian: وادئ آباد, also Romanized as Vādīābād; also known as Vādī ʿAbd) is a village in Bandar Charak Rural District, Shibkaveh District, Bandar Lengeh County, Hormozgan Province, Iran. At the 2006 census, its population was 35, in 6 families.
