= Harsin, Hormozgan =

Harsin حارسين
- Village
- Location within Iran
- Coordinates: 26°57′29″N 54°43′01″E
- Country: Iran
- Province: Hormozgan
- County: Bandar Lengeh
- Bakhsh: Central
- Rural District: Mehran

Population (2006)
  - Total: 195
- Time zone: UTC+3:30 (IRST)
  - Summer (DST): UTC+4:30 (IRDT)

Harsin (Persian: حارسين, also Romanized as Harsīn; also known as ’Āresīn) is a village in Mehran Rural District, in the Central District of Bandar Lengeh County, Hormozgan Province, Iran. At the 2006 census, its population was 195, in 37 families.
