= Bandar-e Lengeh Airport =

Bandar-e Lengeh Airport فرودگاه بندرلنگه
- Village/airport
- Location within Iran
- Coordinates: 26°31′47″N 54°49′44″E
- Country: Iran
- Province: Hormozgan
- County: Bandar Lengeh
- Bakhsh: Central
- Rural District: Moghuyeh

Population (2006)
  - Total: 98
- Time zone: UTC+3:30 (IRST)
  - Summer (DST): UTC+4:30 (IRDT)

Bandar-e Lengeh Airport (Persian: فرودگاه بندرلنگه – Forūdgāh-e Bandar-e Lengeh) is a village and airport in Moghuyeh Rural District, in the Central District of Bandar Lengeh County, Hormozgan Province, Iran. At the 2006 census, its population was 98, in 25 families.
