= Chahkohneh =

Chahkohneh چاه كهنه
- Village
- Location within Iran
- Coordinates: 26°37′35″N 54°57′43″E
- Country: Iran
- Province: Hormozgan
- County: Bandar Lengeh
- Bakhsh: Central
- Rural District: Howmeh

Population (2006)
  - Total: 50
- Time zone: UTC+3:30 (IRST)
  - Summer (DST): UTC+4:30 (IRDT)

Chahkohneh (Persian: چاه كهنه, also Romanized as Chāhkohneh) is a village in Howmeh Rural District, in the Central District of Bandar Lengeh County, Hormozgan Province, Iran. At the 2006 census, its population was 50, in 13 families.
