= Tunb =

Tunb or Tonb (Persian: تنب) may refer to:

- Tunb District, an administrative subdivision of Iran
- Tunb Rural District, an administrative subdivision of Iran
- Tonb Bariku, a village in Hormozgan Province, Iran
- Tonb-e Bongeru, a village in Hormozgan Province, Iran
- Tonb-e Jaki, a village in Hormozgan Province, Iran
- Tonb-e Siyak, a village in Hormozgan Province, Iran
- Tunb-e Bozorg, a village in Tunb Rural District located on Greater Tunb Island
- Greater and Lesser Tunbs, islands in the Persian Gulf
