= Podol =

Podol may refer to:

== Places ==
- Gora-Podol, Belgorod Oblast, Russia
- Podol, Iran
- Podol, Nikolsky District, Vologda Oblast, Russia
- Podol, Vologodsky District, Vologda Oblast, Russia
- Podol, Russian name of Podil, Ukraine
- Vápenný Podol, Czech Republic

== Other ==
- Battle of Podol

== See also ==
- Podolia, a historic region in Eastern Europe
