= Khalfani =

Khalfani خلفاني
- Village
- Location within Iran
- Coordinates: 26°52′06″N 53°46′45″E
- Country: Iran
- Province: Hormozgan
- County: Bandar Lengeh
- Bakhsh: Shibkaveh
- Rural District: Moqam

Population (2006)
  - Total: 362
- Time zone: UTC+3:30 (IRST)
  - Summer (DST): UTC+4:30 (IRDT)

Khalfani (Persian: خلفاني, also Romanized as Khalfānī) is a village in Moqam Rural District, Shibkaveh District, Bandar Lengeh County, Hormozgan Province, Iran. At the 2006 census, its population was 362, in 60 families.
