= Kuh Badu =

Kuh Badu كوه بدو
- Village
- Location within Iran
- Coordinates: 27°05′44″N 54°46′57″E
- Country: Iran
- Province: Hormozgan
- County: Bandar Lengeh
- Bakhsh: Central
- Rural District: Mehran

Population (2006)
  - Total: 248
- Time zone: UTC+3:30 (IRST)
  - Summer (DST): UTC+4:30 (IRDT)

Kuh Badu (Persian: كوه بدو, also Romanized as Kūh Badū) is a village in Mehran Rural District, in the Central District of Bandar Lengeh County, Hormozgan Province, Iran. At the 2006 census, its population was 248, in 52 families.
