= Kafarghan =

Kafarghan كافرغان
- Village
- Location within Iran
- Coordinates: 26°35′12″N 54°34′04″E
- Country: Iran
- Province: Hormozgan
- County: Bandar Lengeh
- Bakhsh: Central
- Rural District: Moghuyeh

Population (2006)
  - Total: 35
- Time zone: UTC+3:30 (IRST)
  - Summer (DST): UTC+4:30 (IRDT)

Kafarghan (Persian: كافرغان, also Romanized as Kāfarghān and Kāferghān; also known as Bandar-e Kāferghān) is a village in Moghuyeh Rural District, in the Central District of Bandar Lengeh County, Hormozgan Province, Iran. At the 2006 census, its population was 35, in 9 families.
