= Bu ol Askar =

Bu ol Askar بوالعسكر
- Village
- Location within Iran
- Coordinates: 26°53′44″N 53°54′13″E
- Country: Iran
- Province: Hormozgan
- County: Bandar Lengeh
- Bakhsh: Shibkaveh
- Rural District: Moqam

Population (2006)
  - Total: 437
- Time zone: UTC+3:30 (IRST)
  - Summer (DST): UTC+4:30 (IRDT)

Bu ol Askar (Persian: بوالعسكر, also Romanized as Bū ol ‘Askar; also known as Bel‘askar and Bulaskai) is a village in Moqam Rural District, Shibkaveh District, Bandar Lengeh County, Hormozgan Province, Iran. At the 2006 census, its population was 437, in 70 families.
