= Kanakh =

Village in Hormozgan province, Iran

Kanakh Persian: كنخ
- Village
- Location within Iran
- Coordinates: 26°54′14″N 55°23′18″E
- Country: Iran
- Province: Hormozgan
- County: Bandar Lengeh
- District: Mehran
- Rural District: Dezhgan

Population (2016)
  - Total: 2,240
- Time zone: UTC+3:30 (IRST)

Kanakh (Persian: كنخ) (Note: Also known as Gankh) is a village in Dezhgan Rural District of Mehran District, Bandar Lengeh County, Hormozgan province, Iran.

== Demographics ==
=== Population ===
At the time of the 2006 National Census, the village's population was 1,490 in 275 households, when it was in the Central District. The following census in 2011 counted 1,868 people in 458 households, by which time the rural district had been separated from the district in the formation of Mehran District. The 2016 census measured the population of the village as 2,240 people in 579 households. It was the most populous village in its rural district.
