= Pisheh Gun =

Pisheh Gun پيشه گون
- Village
- Location within Iran
- Coordinates: 26°57′34″N 55°12′37″E
- Country: Iran
- Province: Hormozgan
- County: Bandar Lengeh
- Bakhsh: Central
- Rural District: Dezhgan

Population (2006)
  - Total: 208
- Time zone: UTC+3:30 (IRST)
  - Summer (DST): UTC+4:30 (IRDT)

Pisheh Gun (Persian: پيشه گون, also Romanized as Pīsheh Gūn) is a village in Dezhgan Rural District, in the Central District of Bandar Lengeh County, Hormozgan Province, Iran. At the 2006 census, its population was 208, in 50 families.
