= Nakhl-e Jamal =

Nakhl-e Jamal نخل جمال
- Village
- Location within Iran
- Coordinates: 26°54′39″N 53°36′38″E
- Country: Iran
- Province: Hormozgan
- County: Bandar Lengeh
- Bakhsh: Shibkaveh
- Rural District: Moqam

Population (2006)
  - Total: 363
- Time zone: UTC+3:30 (IRST)
  - Summer (DST): UTC+4:30 (IRDT)

Nakhl-e Jamal (Persian: نخل جمال, also Romanized as Nakhl-e Jamāl and Nakhl-i-Jamāl) is a village in Moqam Rural District, Shibkaveh District, Bandar Lengeh County, Hormozgan Province, Iran. At the 2006 census, its population was 363, in 66 families.
