= Shekaruyeh =

Shekaruyeh شكروييه
- Village
- Location within Iran
- Coordinates: 26°56′54″N 53°32′13″E
- Country: Iran
- Province: Hormozgan
- County: Bandar Lengeh
- Bakhsh: Shibkaveh
- Rural District: Moqam

Population (2006)
  - Total: 133
- Time zone: UTC+3:30 (IRST)
  - Summer (DST): UTC+4:30 (IRDT)

Shekaruyeh (Persian: شكروييه, also Romanized as Shekarūyeh; also known as Shakaru, Shekaroo, and Shekarū) is a village in Moqam Rural District, Shibkaveh District, Bandar Lengeh County, Hormozgan Province, Iran. At the 2006 census, its population was 133, in 29 families.
