= Hirvand =

Hirvand هيروند
- Village
- Location within Iran
- Coordinates: 26°35′50″N 54°38′32″E
- Country: Iran
- Province: Hormozgan
- County: Bandar Lengeh
- Bakhsh: Central
- Rural District: Moghuyeh

Population (2006)
  - Total: 141
- Time zone: UTC+3:30 (IRST)
  - Summer (DST): UTC+4:30 (IRDT)

Hirvand (Persian: هيروند, also Romanized as Hīrvand; also known as Birkeh Hirvand, Qal‘eh Berkeh-e-Harvand, and Qal‘eh-ye Berkeh Harvand) is a village in Moghuyeh Rural District, in the Central District of Bandar Lengeh County, Hormozgan Province, Iran. At the 2006 census, its population was 141, in 30 families.
