= Dezhgan =

Village in Hormozgan province, Iran

Dezhgan Persian: دژگان
- Village
- Location within Iran
- Coordinates: 26°53′45″N 55°16′45″E
- Country: Iran
- Province: Hormozgan
- County: Bandar Lengeh
- District: Mehran
- Rural District: Dezhgan

Population (2016)
  - Total: 1,891
- Time zone: UTC+3:30 (IRST)

Dezhgan (Persian: دژگان) (Note: Also romanized as Dezhgān) is a village in, and the capital of, Dezhgan Rural District of Mehran District, Bandar Lengeh County, Hormozgan province, Iran.

== Demographics ==
=== Population ===
At the time of the 2006 National Census, the village's population was 1,346 in 309 households, when it was in the Central District. The following census in 2011 counted 2,067 people in 420 households, by which time the rural district had been separated from the district in the formation of Mehran District. The 2016 census measured the population of the village as 1,891 people in 499 households.
