= Govah Kuh =

Govah Kuh گواه كوه
- Village
- Location within Iran
- Coordinates: 26°58′12″N 55°15′36″E
- Country: Iran
- Province: Hormozgan
- County: Bandar Lengeh
- Bakhsh: Central
- Rural District: Dezhgan

Population (2006)
  - Total: 113
- Time zone: UTC+3:30 (IRST)
  - Summer (DST): UTC+4:30 (IRDT)

Govah Kuh (Persian: گواه كوه, also Romanized as Govāh Kūh; also known as Govākūh) is a village in Dezhgan Rural District, in the Central District of Bandar Lengeh County, Hormozgan Province, Iran. At the 2006 census, its population was 113, in 25 families.
