= Nakhlemir =

Nakhlemir نخل مير
- Village
- Location within Iran
- Coordinates: 26°49′47″N 54°12′27″E
- Country: Iran
- Province: Hormozgan
- County: Bandar Lengeh
- Bakhsh: Shibkaveh
- Rural District: Bandar Charak

Population (2006)
  - Total: 177
- Time zone: UTC+3:30 (IRST)
  - Summer (DST): UTC+4:30 (IRDT)

Nakhlemir (Persian: نخل مير, also Romanized as Nakhlemīr, Nakhl-e Mīr, Nakhl-i-Mir, and Nakhl Mīr) is a village in Bandar Charak Rural District, Shibkaveh District, Bandar Lengeh County, Hormozgan Province, Iran. At the 2006 census, its population was 177, in 37 families.
