= Kal Qari =

Kal Qari كل قري
- Village
- Location within Iran
- Coordinates: 35°45′43″N 59°13′35″E
- Country: Iran
- Province: Razavi Khorasan
- County: Torbat-e Heydarieh
- Bakhsh: Jolgeh Rokh
- Rural District: Bala Rokh

Population (2006)
  - Total: 124
- Time zone: UTC+3:30 (IRST)
  - Summer (DST): UTC+4:30 (IRDT)

Kal Qari (Persian: كل قري, also Romanized as Kal Qarī and Kāl-e Qarī) is a village in Bala Rokh Rural District, Jolgeh Rokh District, Torbat-e Heydarieh County, Razavi Khorasan Province, Iran. At the 2006 census, its population was 124, in 32 families.
