= Hasham-e Champeh =

Hasham-e Champeh حشم چمپه
- Village
- Location within Iran
- Coordinates: 26°47′45″N 54°44′39″E
- Country: Iran
- Province: Hormozgan
- County: Bandar Lengeh
- Bakhsh: Central
- Rural District: Howmeh

Population (2006)
  - Total: 55
- Time zone: UTC+3:30 (IRST)
  - Summer (DST): UTC+4:30 (IRDT)

Hasham-e Champeh (Persian: حشم چمپه, also Romanized as Ḩasham-e Champeh) is a village in Howmeh Rural District, in the Central District of Bandar Lengeh County, Hormozgan Province, Iran. At the 2006 census, its population was 55, in 12 families.
