= Bandar-e Chiruiyeh =

Bandar-e Chiruiyeh بندرچيروئيه
- Village
- Location within Iran
- Coordinates: 26°42′53″N 53°44′04″E
- Country: Iran
- Province: Hormozgan
- County: Bandar Lengeh
- Bakhsh: Shibkaveh
- Rural District: Moqam

Population (2006)
  - Total: 584
- Time zone: UTC+3:30 (IRST)
  - Summer (DST): UTC+4:30 (IRDT)

Bandar-e Chiruiyeh (Persian: بندرچيروئيه, also Romanized as Bandar-e Chīrūīyeh; also known as ’Abrūyeh, Bandar-e Chīrū, Cherūyeh, Chīrū, Chīrūīyeh, and Chīrūyeh) is a village in Moqam Rural District, Shibkaveh District, Bandar Lengeh County, Hormozgan Province, Iran. At the 2006 census, its population was 584, in 86 families.
