= Koverdan, Bandar Lengeh =

Koverdan كوردان
- Village
- Location within Iran
- Coordinates: 27°00′55″N 54°56′37″E
- Country: Iran
- Province: Hormozgan
- County: Bandar Lengeh
- Bakhsh: Central
- Rural District: Mehran

Population (2006)
  - Total: 257
- Time zone: UTC+3:30 (IRST)
  - Summer (DST): UTC+4:30 (IRDT)

Koverdan (Persian: كوردان, also Romanized as Koverdān) is a village in Mehran Rural District, in the Central District of Bandar Lengeh County, Hormozgan Province, Iran. At the 2006 census, its population was 257, in 48 families.
