= Podol, Iran =

Village in Hormozgan province, Iran

Podol Persian: پدل
- Village
- Location within Iran
- Coordinates: 27°00′54″N 54°57′54″E
- Country: Iran
- Province: Hormozgan
- County: Bandar Lengeh
- District: Mehran
- Rural District: Mehran

Population (2016)
  - Total: 1,276
- Time zone: UTC+3:30 (IRST)

Podol (Persian: پدل) is a village in, and the capital of, Mehran Rural District of Mehran District, Bandar Lengeh County, Hormozgan province, Iran.

== Demographics ==
=== Population ===
At the time of the 2006 National Census, the village's population was 1,250 in 240 households, when it was in the Central District. The following census in 2011 counted 1,271 people in 325 households, by which time the rural district had been separated from the district in the formation of Mehran District. The 2016 census measured the population of the village as 1,276 people in 359 households. It was the most populous village in its rural district.
