= Lamazan =

City in Hormozgan province, Iran

Lamazan Persian: لمزان
- City
- Location within Iran
- Coordinates: 27°02′59″N 54°53′10″E
- Country: Iran
- Province: Hormozgan
- County: Bandar Lengeh
- District: Mehran

Population (2016)
  - Total: 2,745
- Time zone: UTC+3:30 (IRST)

Lamazan (Persian: لمزان) (Note: Also romanized as Lamazān and Lemazān) is a city in, and the capital of, Mehran District of Bandar Lengeh County, Hormozgan province, Iran.

== Demographics ==
=== Population ===
At the time of the 2006 National Census, Lamazan's population was 2,101 in 405 households, when it was a village in Mehran Rural District of the Central District. The following census in 2011 counted 2,721 people in 633 households, by which time the rural district had been separated from the district in the formation of Mehran District. The 2016 census measured the population as 2,745 people in 646 households, when Lamazan had been elevated to the status of a city.
