= Bandar-e Shenas =

Village in Hormozgan province, Iran

Bandar-e Shenas Persian: بندر شناس
- Village
- Location within Iran
- Coordinates: 26°31′35″N 54°47′45″E
- Country: Iran
- Province: Hormozgan
- County: Bandar Lengeh
- District: Central
- Rural District: Moghuyeh

Population (2016)
  - Total: 2,998
- Time zone: UTC+3:30 (IRST)

Bandar-e Shenas (Persian: بندرشناس) (Note: Also romanized as Bandar-e Shenās; also known as Bandar-e Shīās, Shenās, and Shīās) is a village in Moghuyeh Rural District of the Central District of Bandar Lengeh County, Hormozgan province, Iran.

== Demographics ==
=== Population ===
At the time of the 2006 National Census, the village's population was 1,631 in 274 households. The following census in 2011 counted 2,282 people in 499 households. The 2016 census measured the population of the village as 2,998 people in 617 households. It was the most populous village in its rural district.
