= Emadiyeh-ye Sofla =

Emadiyeh-ye Sofla عماديه سفلي
- Village
- Location within Iran
- Coordinates: 35°33′04″N 59°07′12″E
- Country: Iran
- Province: Razavi Khorasan
- County: Torbat-e Heydarieh
- Bakhsh: Jolgeh Rokh
- Rural District: Mian Rokh

Population (2006)
  - Total: 105
- Time zone: UTC+3:30 (IRST)
  - Summer (DST): UTC+4:30 (IRDT)

Emadiyeh-ye Sofla (Persian: عماديه سفلي, also Romanized as ‘Emādīyeh-ye Soflá; also known as ‘Emādīyeh) is a village in Mian Rokh Rural District, Jolgeh Rokh District, Torbat-e Heydarieh County, Razavi Khorasan Province, Iran. At the 2006 census, its population was 105, in 25 families.
