= Pishakhor =

Pishakhvor پيش اخور
- Village
- Location within Iran
- Coordinates: 35°38′40″N 59°08′37″E
- Country: Iran
- Province: Razavi Khorasan
- County: Torbat-e Heydarieh
- Bakhsh: Jolgeh Rokh
- Rural District: Bala Rokh

Population (2006)
  - Total: 125
- Time zone: UTC+3:30 (IRST)
  - Summer (DST): UTC+4:30 (IRDT)

Pishakhvor (Persian: پيش اخور, also Romanized as Pīshākhvor, Pish Akhor, and Pīshākhūr; also known as Mīshābād, Pācheh Khowr, and Pashakhūr) is a village in Bala Rokh Rural District, Jolgeh Rokh District, Torbat-e Heydarieh County, Razavi Khorasan Province, Iran. At the 2006 census, its population was 125, in 27 families.
