= Hasham-e Howdow =

Coordinates: 27.1480°N 54.8344°E

Hasham-e Howdow حشم حودو
- Village
- Interactive map of Hasham-e Howdow
- Country: Iran
- Province: Hormozgan
- County: Bandar Lengeh
- Bakhsh: Central
- Rural District: Howmeh

Population (2006)
  - Total: 132
- Time zone: UTC+3:30 (IRST)
  - Summer (DST): UTC+4:30 (IRDT)

Hasham-e Howdow (Persian: حشم حودو, also Romanized as Ḩasham-e Ḩowdow) is a village in Howmeh Rural District, in the Central District of Bandar Lengeh County, Hormozgan Province, Iran. At the 2006 census, its population was 132, in 28 families.
