= Gezir =

Village in Hormozgan province, Iran

Gezir Persian: گزير
- Village
- Location within Iran
- Coordinates: 26°43′30″N 54°56′46″E
- Country: Iran
- Province: Hormozgan
- County: Bandar Lengeh
- District: Central
- Rural District: Howmeh

Population (2016)
  - Total: 4,693
- Time zone: UTC+3:30 (IRST)

Gezir (Persian: گزير) (Note: Also known as Gezire) is a village in, and the capital of, Howmeh Rural District of the Central District of Bandar Lengeh County, Hormozgan province, Iran.

== Demographics ==
=== Population ===
At the time of the 2006 National Census, the village's population was 3,729 in 662 households. The following census in 2011 counted 4,168 people in 1,006 households. The 2016 census measured the population of the village as 4,693 people in 1,088 households. It was the most populous village in its rural district.
