= Hanadan, Iran =

Hanadan حنادان
- Village
- Location within Iran
- Coordinates: 26°55′04″N 55°12′40″E
- Country: Iran
- Province: Hormozgan
- County: Bandar Lengeh
- Bakhsh: Central
- Rural District: Dezhgan

Population (2006)
  - Total: 96
- Time zone: UTC+3:30 (IRST)
  - Summer (DST): UTC+4:30 (IRDT)

Hanadan (Persian: حنادان, also Romanized as Ḩanādān; also known as Ḩanādāneh and Hanādūn) is a village in Dezhgan Rural District, in the Central District of Bandar Lengeh County, Hormozgan Province, Iran. At the 2006 census, its population was 96, in 20 families.
