= Jabri, Iran =

Jabri (Persian: جبري) may refer to:

- Jabri, Bushehr
- Jabri, Hormozgan
