= Hesar Jalal =

Hesar Jalal حصارجلال
- Village
- Location within Iran
- Coordinates: 35°44′37″N 59°11′12″E
- Country: Iran
- Province: Razavi Khorasan
- County: Torbat-e Heydarieh
- Bakhsh: Jolgeh Rokh
- Rural District: Bala Rokh

Population (2006)
  - Total: 208
- Time zone: UTC+3:30 (IRST)
  - Summer (DST): UTC+4:30 (IRDT)

Hesar Jalal (Persian: حصارجلال, also Romanized as Ḩeşār Jalāl; also known as Dar Chenār Jālāi, Dar Chenār Jalāl, and Dar-e Chenār Jalāl) is a village in Bala Rokh Rural District, Jolgeh Rokh District, Torbat-e Heydarieh County, Razavi Khorasan Province, Iran. At the 2006 census, its population was 208, in 51 families.
