= Kordan =

Kordan or Kurdan or Koverdan (Persian: كوردان) may refer to:

- Ali Kordan, Iranian politician
- Kordan, Alborz, a village in Alborz Province, Iran
- Koverdan, Bandar Lengeh, a village in Hormozgan Province, Iran
- Kurdan, Bastak, a village in Hormozgan Province, Iran
- Kordan, Kerman, a village in Kerman Province, Iran
