= Kuhi (disambiguation) =

Kuhi may refer to:

- Kuhi, a town and a tehsil in Umred subdivision of Nagpur district in Nagpur, India
- kuhi stones carved with haiku poems
- Kuhi, Hormozgan, a village in Iran
- Kuhi, Bastak, a village in Hormozgan Province, Iran
- Kuhi, Razavi Khorasan, a village in Iran
- Kuhi, Yazd, village in Iran
- Kuhi, Tajikistan, village in Sughd Region, Tajikistan
