= Gerzeh, Iran =

Village in Hormozgan province, Iran

Gerzeh Persian: گرزه
- Village
- Location within Iran
- Coordinates: 26°44′20″N 53°57′29″E
- Country: Iran
- Province: Hormozgan
- County: Bandar Lengeh
- District: Shibkaveh
- Rural District: Bandar Charak

Population (2016)
  - Total: 1,170
- Time zone: UTC+3:30 (IRST)

Gerzeh (Persian: گرزه) (Note: Also romanized as Gorzeh; also known as Bandar-e-Gowrzeh, Bandar-e-Gūrzeh, Bandar-e Korzeh, Gowrzeh, and Jirzeh) is a village in Bandar Charak Rural District, Shibkaveh District, Bandar Lengeh County, Hormozgan province, Iran.

== Demographics ==
=== Population ===
At the time of the 2006 National Census, the village's population was 805 in 130 households. The following census in 2011 counted 926 people in 217 households. The 2016 census measured the population of the village as 1,170 people in 267 households. It was the most populous village in its rural district.
