= Abdaru =

Abdaru ابدارو
- Village
- Location within Iran
- Coordinates: 35°40′24″N 59°20′02″E
- Country: Iran
- Province: Razavi Khorasan
- County: Torbat-e Heydarieh
- Bakhsh: Jolgeh Rokh
- Rural District: Bala Rokh

Population (2006)
  - Total: 244
- Time zone: UTC+3:30 (IRST)
  - Summer (DST): UTC+4:30 (IRDT)

Abdaru (Persian: ابدارو, also Romanized as Ābdārū) is a village in Bala Rokh Rural District, Jolgeh Rokh District, Torbat-e Heydarieh County, Razavi Khorasan Province, Iran. At the 2006 census, its population was 244, in 70 families.

== See also ==
- List of cities, towns and villages in Razavi Khorasan Province
