= Ghonchi, Iran =

Ghonchi غنچي
- Village
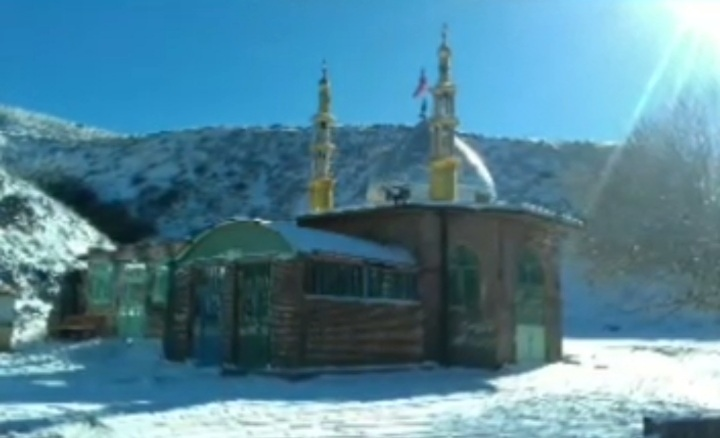
- Imamzadeh (shrine, mausoleum) at Ghonchi village, Torbat-e Heydarieh County, Razavi Khorasan Province, Iran

- Location within Iran
- Coordinates: 35°30′49″N 59°13′15″E
- Country: Iran
- Province: Razavi Khorasan
- County: Torbat-e Heydarieh
- Bakhsh: Jolgeh Rokh
- Rural District: Mian Rokh

Population (2006)
  - Total: 157
- Time zone: UTC+3:30 (IRST)
  - Summer (DST): UTC+4:30 (IRDT)

Ghonchi (Persian: غنچي, also Romanized as Ghonchī; also known as Qonchī) is a village in Mian Rokh Rural District, Jolgeh Rokh District, Torbat-e Heydarieh County, Razavi Khorasan Province, Iran. At the 2006 census, its population was 157, in 43 families.
