= Ganai =

Ganai may refer to:

- Ganai language, an Australian language
- Ganai people, an ethnic group of Australia
- Ganai, Iran, a village

== See also ==
- Genai, Iran, a village in Bandar Lengeh County, Hormozgan Province, Iran
- Genayit, a village in Kerman, Iran
