= Vaset =

Vaset may refer to:

- Vaset, Kerman, Iran
- Vaset, Razavi Khorasan, Iran
- Vaset, Norway
