= Chahar Takhteh =

Chahar Takhteh or Chahartakhteh (Persian: چهارتخته) may refer to:

- Chahar Takhteh, Lorestan
- Chahar Takhteh Guk, Razavi Khorasan Province
