= Hasteh Kuh =

Hasteh Kuh (Persian: هسته كوه) may refer to:

- Hasteh Kuh, Hormozgan
- Hasteh Kuh, Kohgiluyeh and Boyer-Ahmad
