= Hiru, Hormozgan =

Hiru هيرو
- Village
- Location within Iran
- Coordinates: 27°02′55″N 55°04′43″E
- Country: Iran
- Province: Hormozgan
- County: Bandar Lengeh
- Bakhsh: Central
- Rural District: Mehran

Population (2006)
  - Total: 271
- Time zone: UTC+3:30 (IRST)
  - Summer (DST): UTC+4:30 (IRDT)

Hiru (Persian: هيرو, also Romanized as Hīrū) is a village in Mehran Rural District, in the Central District of Bandar Lengeh County, Hormozgan Province, Iran. At the 2006 census, its population was 271, in 54 families.
