= Bandar-e Moqam =

Village in Hormozgan province, Iran

Bandar-e Moqam Persian: بندر مقام
- Village
- Location within Iran
- Coordinates: 26°57′57″N 53°28′52″E
- Country: Iran
- Province: Hormozgan
- County: Bandar Lengeh
- District: Shibkaveh
- Rural District: Moqam

Population (2016)
  - Total: 1,955
- Time zone: UTC+3:30 (IRST)

Bandar-e Moqam (Persian: بندرمقام) (Note: Also romanized as Bandar Moqām, Bandar-e Moqām, and Bandar-e Maqām; also known as Bandar-e Margām, Bandar Muqām, Maqām, Moqām, and Muqām) is a village in, and the capital of, Moqam Rural District of Shibkaveh District, Bandar Lengeh County, Hormozgan province, Iran.

== Demographics ==
=== Population ===
At the time of the 2006 National Census, the village's population was 1,537 in 296 households. The following census in 2011 counted 1,820 people in 410 households. The 2016 census measured the population of the village as 1,955 people in 479 households. It was the most populous village in its rural district.
