= Garisheh, Hormozgan =

Garisheh گريشه
- Village
- Location within Iran
- Coordinates: 26°50′24″N 53°46′41″E
- Country: Iran
- Province: Hormozgan
- County: Bandar Lengeh
- Bakhsh: Shibkaveh
- Rural District: Moqam

Population (2006)
  - Total: 200
- Time zone: UTC+3:30 (IRST)
  - Summer (DST): UTC+4:30 (IRDT)

Garisheh (Persian: گريشه, also Romanized as Garīsheh and Gerīsheh) is a village in Moqam Rural District, Shibkaveh District, Bandar Lengeh County, Hormozgan Province, Iran. At the 2006 census, its population was 200, in 41 families.
