= Shur Hesar =

Shur Hesar شورحصار
- Village
- Location within Iran
- Coordinates: 35°32′36″N 59°17′23″E
- Country: Iran
- Province: Razavi Khorasan
- County: Torbat-e Heydarieh
- Bakhsh: Jolgeh Rokh
- Rural District: Mian Rokh

Population (2006)
  - Total: 243
- Time zone: UTC+3:30 (IRST)
  - Summer (DST): UTC+4:30 (IRDT)

Shur Hesar (Persian: شورحصار, also Romanized as Shūr Ḩeşār) is a village in Mian Rokh Rural District, Jolgeh Rokh District, Torbat-e Heydarieh County, Razavi Khorasan Province, Iran. At the 2006 census, its population was 243, in 58 families.
