= Tonb-e Jaki =

Tonb-e Jaki تنب جكي
- Village
- Location within Iran
- Coordinates: 26°56′18″N 55°12′34″E
- Country: Iran
- Province: Hormozgan
- County: Bandar Lengeh
- Bakhsh: Central
- Rural District: Dezhgan

Population (2006)
  - Total: 62
- Time zone: UTC+3:30 (IRST)
  - Summer (DST): UTC+4:30 (IRDT)

Tonb-e Jaki (Persian: تنب جكي, also Romanized as Tonb-e Jakī; also known as Tonb-e Chīgī) is a village in Dezhgan Rural District, in the Central District of Bandar Lengeh County, Hormozgan Province, Iran. At the 2006 census, its population was 62, in 12 families.
