= Asgerd =

Asgerd عسگرد
- Village
- Location within Iran
- Coordinates: 35°39′38″N 59°17′03″E
- Country: Iran
- Province: Razavi Khorasan
- County: Torbat-e Heydarieh
- Bakhsh: Jolgeh Rokh
- Rural District: Bala Rokh

Population (2006)
  - Total: 142
- Time zone: UTC+3:30 (IRST)
  - Summer (DST): UTC+4:30 (IRDT)

Asgerd (Persian: عسگرد, also Romanized as ‘Asgerd) is a village in Bala Rokh Rural District, Jolgeh Rokh District, Torbat-e Heydarieh County, Razavi Khorasan Province, Iran. At the 2006 census, its population was 142, in 44 families.

== See also ==
- List of cities, towns and villages in Razavi Khorasan Province
