= Armagh (disambiguation) =

Armagh is a city in Northern Ireland. It may also refer to:

- County Armagh, one of the traditional counties of Ireland
- Armagh (barony)
- Armagh City and District Council
- Archdiocese of Armagh (disambiguation), one of the ecclesiastical provinces of Ireland
- Armagh Observatory
- Armagh Planetarium
- Armagh railway station

As a constituency:

- Armagh (Assembly constituency), used from 1973 until 1986
- Armagh Borough (Parliament of Ireland constituency), used until 1801
- County Armagh (Parliament of Ireland constituency), used until 1801
- Armagh (Northern Ireland Parliament constituency), used from 1921 until 1929
- Armagh (UK Parliament constituency), used from 1801 until 1983
- Armagh City (UK Parliament constituency), used from 1801 until 1885

It is also the name of places outside Ireland:

In Australia:

- Armagh, South Australia

In Canada:

- Armagh, Quebec

In Iran:

- Armagh, Iran

In New Zealand:

- Armagh Street in central Christchurch

In the United States of America:

- Armagh, Pennsylvania
- Armagh Township, Pennsylvania
