= Hamhang =

Hamhang هم هنگ
- Village
- Location within Iran
- Coordinates: 27°04′01″N 54°57′47″E
- Country: Iran
- Province: Hormozgan
- County: Bandar Lengeh
- Bakhsh: Central
- Rural District: Mehran

Population (2006)
  - Total: 133
- Time zone: UTC+3:30 (IRST)
  - Summer (DST): UTC+4:30 (IRDT)

Hamhang (Persian: هم هنگ; also known as Hamang) is a village in Mehran Rural District, in the Central District of Bandar Lengeh County, Hormozgan Province, Iran. At the 2006 census, its population was 133, in 32 families.
