= Jabri, Hormozgan =

Jabri جبري
- Village
- Location within Iran
- Coordinates: 26°52′24″N 53°59′58″E
- Country: Iran
- Province: Hormozgan
- County: Bandar Lengeh
- Bakhsh: Shibkaveh
- Rural District: Bandar Charak

Population (2006)
  - Total: 129
- Time zone: UTC+3:30 (IRST)
  - Summer (DST): UTC+4:30 (IRDT)

Jabri (Persian: جبري, also Romanized as Jabrī) is a village in Bandar Charak Rural District, Shibkaveh District, Bandar Lengeh County, Hormozgan Province, Iran. At the 2006 census, its population was 129, in 27 families.
