= Bandar-e Mollu =

Bandar-e Mollu بندرملو
- Village
- Location within Iran
- Coordinates: 26°31′06″N 54°43′32″E
- Country: Iran
- Province: Hormozgan
- County: Bandar Lengeh
- Bakhsh: Central
- Rural District: Moghuyeh

Population (2006)
  - Total: 513
- Time zone: UTC+3:30 (IRST)
  - Summer (DST): UTC+4:30 (IRDT)

Bandar-e Mollu (Persian: بندرملو, also Romanized as Bandar-e Mollū; also known as Melū, Milu, Mollav, Molū, and Mūllū) is a village in Moghuyeh Rural District, in the Central District of Bandar Lengeh County, Hormozgan Province, Iran. At the 2006 census, its population was 513, in 75 families.
