= Garisheh =

Garisheh or Gerisheh (Persian: گريشه) may refer to:

- Garisheh, Hormozgan
- Gerisheh, Kermanshah
- Garisheh, Sistan and Baluchestan
