= Konderan, Hormozgan =

Konderan كندران
- Village
- Location within Iran
- Coordinates: 26°45′19″N 54°27′22″E
- Country: Iran
- Province: Hormozgan
- County: Bandar Lengeh
- Bakhsh: Central
- Rural District: Moghuyeh

Population (2006)
  - Total: 404
- Time zone: UTC+3:30 (IRST)
  - Summer (DST): UTC+4:30 (IRDT)

Konderan (Persian: كندران, also Romanized as Konderān and Kondorān; also known as Kandārun, Kandūrān, Kondārūn, and Kondūrān) is a village in Moghuyeh Rural District, in the Central District of Bandar Lengeh County, Hormozgan Province, Iran. At the 2006 census, its population was 404, in 76 families.
