= Gavmiri =

Gavmiri گاوميري
- village
- Location within Iran
- Coordinates: 26°53′32″N 55°19′41″E
- Country: Iran
- Province: Hormozgan
- County: Bandar Lengeh
- Bakhsh: Central
- Rural District: Dezhgan

Area
  - Total: 17,579 km^{2} (6,787 sq mi)

Population (1969)
  - Total: 6,390
  - Density: 0.364/km^{2} (0.941/sq mi)
- Time zone: UTC+3:30 (IRST)
  - Summer (DST): UTC+4:30 (IRDT)

Gavmiri (Persian: گاوميري, also Romanized as Gāvmīrī; also known as Goveh and Gowh) is a village in Dezhgan Rural District, in the Central District of Bandar Lengeh County, Hormozgan Province, Iran. At the 2006 census, its population was 639, in 137 families. In terms of age and history, Gavmiri, which dates back to about 1500 years, is one of the oldest villages in this region. During the spring, this area becomes green and people come to this area to watch nature and enjoy.
