= Armak =

Armak or Ormak (Persian: ارمك) may refer to:

- Armak, East Azerbaijan
- Armak, Hormozgan
- Ormak, Isfahan
- Armak, Mazandaran
