= Tonb-e Bongeru =

Tonb-e Bongeru تنب بنگرو
- Village
- Location within Iran
- Coordinates: 26°55′19″N 55°10′18″E
- Country: Iran
- Province: Hormozgan
- County: Bandar Lengeh
- Bakhsh: Central
- Rural District: Dezhgan

Population (2006)
  - Total: 241
- Time zone: UTC+3:30 (IRST)
  - Summer (DST): UTC+4:30 (IRDT)

Tonb-e Bongeru (Persian: تنب بنگرو, also Romanized as Tonb-e Bongerū; also known as Tomb-e Bongerū) is a village in Dezhgan Rural District in the Central District of Bandar Lengeh County, Hormozgan Province, Iran. At the 2006 census, its population was 241 in 50 families.
