= Konderan =

Konderan or Kandaran or Kondoran (Persian: كندران) may refer to:

- Kandaran, Fars
- Konderan, Hormozgan
