= Sang-e Siah =

Sang-e Siah or Sang-e Siyah (Persian: سنگ سياه) may refer to:

- Sang-e Siyah, Hormozgan
- Sang-e Siah, Razavi Khorasan
