= Sang-e Siyah, Hormozgan =

Sang-e Siyah سنگ سياه
- Village
- Location within Iran
- Coordinates: 26°53′59″N 55°18′45″E
- Country: Iran
- Province: Hormozgan
- County: Bandar Lengeh
- Bakhsh: Central
- Rural District: Dezhgan

Population (2006)
  - Total: 100
- Time zone: UTC+3:30 (IRST)
  - Summer (DST): UTC+4:30 (IRDT)

Sang-e Siyah (Persian: سنگ سياه, also Romanized as Sang-e Sīyāh) is a village in Dezhgan Rural District, in the Central District of Bandar Lengeh County, Hormozgan Province, Iran. At the 2006 census, its population was 100, in 23 families.
