= Kuhi, Hormozgan =

Kuhi كوهي
- Village
- Location within Iran
- Coordinates: 26°37′27″N 54°58′20″E
- Country: Iran
- Province: Hormozgan
- County: Bandar Lengeh
- Bakhsh: Central
- Rural District: Howmeh

Population (2006)
  - Total: 49
- Time zone: UTC+3:30 (IRST)
  - Summer (DST): UTC+4:30 (IRDT)

Kuhi (Persian: كوهي, also Romanized as Kūhī and Koohi) is a village in Howmeh Rural District, in the Central District of Bandar Lengeh County, Hormozgan Province, Iran. At the 2006 census, its population was 49, in 15 families.
