= Hasteh Kuh, Hormozgan =

Hasteh Kuh هسته كوه
- Village
- Country: Iran
- Province: Hormozgan
- County: Bandar Lengeh
- Bakhsh: Central
- Rural District: Mehran

Population (2006)
  - Total: 50
- Time zone: UTC+3:30 (IRST)
  - Summer (DST): UTC+4:30 (IRDT)

Hasteh Kuh (Persian: هسته كوه, also Romanized as Hasteh Kūh) is a village in Mehran Rural District, in the Central District of Bandar Lengeh County, Hormozgan Province, Iran. At the 2006 census, its population was 50, in 15 families.
