= Hameyran, Bandar Lengeh =

Hameyran حميران
- Village
- Location within Iran
- Coordinates: 26°41′58″N 55°05′05″E
- Country: Iran
- Province: Hormozgan
- County: Bandar Lengeh
- Bakhsh: Central
- Rural District: Howmeh

Population (2006)
  - Total: 547
- Time zone: UTC+3:30 (IRST)
  - Summer (DST): UTC+4:30 (IRDT)

Hameyran (Persian: حميران, also Romanized as Ḩameyrān; also known as Ḩameyrān-e ‘Olyā) is a village in Howmeh Rural District, in the Central District of Bandar Lengeh County, Hormozgan Province, Iran. At the 2006 census, its population was 547, in 106 families.
