= Mehragan-e Pain =

Mehragan-e Pain مهرگان پايين
- Village
- Location within Iran
- Coordinates: 26°45′11″N 54°50′42″E
- Country: Iran
- Province: Hormozgan
- County: Bandar Lengeh
- Bakhsh: Central
- Rural District: Howmeh

Population (2006)
  - Total: 208
- Time zone: UTC+3:30 (IRST)
  - Summer (DST): UTC+4:30 (IRDT)

Mehragan-e Pain (Persian: مهرگان پايين, also Romanized as Mehragān-e Pā‘īn; also known as Mehrakān-e Pā‘īn) is a village in Howmeh Rural District, in the Central District of Bandar Lengeh County, Hormozgan Province, Iran. At the 2006 census, its population was 208, in 35 families.
