= Mehragan-e Bala =

Mehragan-e Bala مهرگان بالا
- Village
- Location within Iran
- Coordinates: 26°45′33″N 54°50′17″E
- Country: Iran
- Province: Hormozgan
- County: Bandar Lengeh
- Bakhsh: Central
- Rural District: Howmeh

Population (2006)
  - Total: 702
- Time zone: UTC+3:30 (IRST)
  - Summer (DST): UTC+4:30 (IRDT)

Mehragan-e Bala (Persian: مهرگان بالا, also Romanized as Mehragān-e Bālā; also known as Mehragān, Mehrakān, Mehrakān-e Bālā, Mehrkān, and Mihrakān) is a village in Howmeh Rural District, in the Central District of Bandar Lengeh County, Hormozgan Province, Iran. At the 2006 census, its population was 702, in 138 families.
