= Sarhang =

Sarhang may refer to:

- Sarhang (rank)
- Male name in Kurdish.
- Sarhang Mohsen, Iraqi footballer
- Sarhang, Kohgiluyeh and Boyer-Ahmad, a village in Iran
- Sarhang, Razavi Khorasan, a village in Iran
