= Genai, Iran =

Genai گنايي
- Village
- Location within Iran
- Coordinates: 26°53′41″N 55°21′04″E
- Country: Iran
- Province: Hormozgan
- County: Bandar Lengeh
- Bakhsh: Central
- Rural District: Dezhgan

Population (2006)
  - Total: 554
- Time zone: UTC+3:30 (IRST)

Genai (Persian: گنايي, also Romanized as Genā‘ī and Ganā‘ī; also known as Ganā) is a village in Dezhgan Rural District, in the Central District of Bandar Lengeh County, Hormozgan Province, Iran. At the 2006 census, its population was 554, in 131 families.
