= Chahar Derakht =

Chahar Derakht چهاردرخت
- Village
- Location within Iran
- Coordinates: 35°31′25″N 59°30′16″E
- Country: Iran
- Province: Razavi Khorasan
- County: Torbat-e Heydarieh
- Bakhsh: Jolgeh Rokh
- Rural District: Pain Rokh

Population (2006)
  - Total: 34
- Time zone: UTC+3:30 (IRST)
  - Summer (DST): UTC+4:30 (IRDT)

Chahar Derakht (Persian: چهاردرخت, also Romanized as Chahār Derakht) is a village in Pain Rokh Rural District, Jolgeh Rokh District, Torbat-e Heydarieh County, Razavi Khorasan Province, Iran. At the 2006 census, its population was 34, in 8 families.
