= Alaqeh =

Village in Razavi Khorasan province, Iran

Alaqeh Persian: علاقه
- Village
- Location within Iran
- Coordinates: 35°39′35″N 59°18′11″E
- Country: Iran
- Province: Razavi Khorasan
- County: Torbat-e Heydarieh
- District: Jolgeh Rokh
- Rural District: Bala Rokh

Population (2016)
  - Total: 604
- Time zone: UTC+3:30 (IRST)

Alaqeh (Persian: علاقه) (Note: Also romanized as ‘Alāqeh) is a village in Bala Rokh Rural District of Jolgeh Rokh District in Torbat-e Heydarieh County, Razavi Khorasan province, Iran.

== Demographics ==
=== Population ===
At the time of the 2006 National Census, the village's population was 608 in 179 households. The following census in 2011 counted 590 people in 182 households. The 2016 census measured the population of the village as 604 people in 190 households.
