= Hanadan =

Hanadan may refer to:

- Boys Over Flowers -Japanese manga series
- Hanadan, Iran
- Hanadan, Yemen
