= Zarkak =

Zarkak (Persian: زركك) may refer to:

- Zarkak, Fariman
- Zarkak, Torbat-e Heydarieh
