= Al-Suwaidan (tribe) =

آل سويدان

Regions with significant populations
- Levant, Najd (Saudi Arabia)

Religion
- Islam

Al-Suwaidan (Arabic: آل سويدان) is a prominent Husaynid Sayyid family with origins in both the Levant and Najd. The family has long been associated with leadership, governance, and scholarship, and it maintained strong relations with the Ottoman Empire.

== Lineage ==
The Al-Suwaidan family traces its descent to Sayyid Muhammad Abu Abid al-Husayni, whose tomb is located in Deir ez-Zor. His ancestry goes back to Abu Jaafar Muhammad al-Akbar, known as "Sab‘ al-Dujayl," the son of Ali al-Hadi, son of Muhammad al-Jawad, son of Ali al-Rida, son of Musa al-Kazim, son of Ja'far al-Sadiq, son of Muhammad al-Baqir, son of Ali al-Sajjad, son of Husayn ibn Ali, son of Abu Talib ibn Abd al-Muttalib, son of Hashim.

== Origin and migration ==
The family's earliest known ancestor is Sayyid Ahmad Suwaidan al-Maknasi al-Husayni, who returned from Meknes, Morocco to Aleppo in 1480. His forefather Muhammad al-Husayni had earlier fled Aleppo during the unrest of the early 8th century, possibly at the time of Tamerlane’s siege of the city in 1400. A preserved family tree dating back to 1480 documents this lineage and bears the signatures of several historians and notable sayyids.

== Branches ==
From Sayyid Ahmad Suwaidan al-Husayni descended seven main branches:

- Al-Suwaidan Agha
- Al-Husayn Agha
- Al-Issa
- Al-Mahjoub
- Al-Maknasi
- Al-Makansi
- Al-Najajra

== Al-Suwaidan in Homs ==
Following their period in Aleppo, members of the family settled in Homs, where their ancestor Muhammad Bey Sweidan was appointed Emir of the city around 1516. Historical records indicate that his appointment came during the reign of either Mehmed the Conqueror or Selim I following the Battle of Marj Dabiq.

Notable members from the Homs branch include:

- Ibrahim Agha Suwaidan al-Husayni, a leading figure in Homs who served multiple terms as governor between 1100 and 1120 AH. He was praised by Abd al-Ghani al-Nabulsi during his visit to the city in 1105 AH.
- Suleiman Agha Suwaidan al-Husayni, Emir of Homs in 1130 AH; his mother, Khadijah, was the daughter of Sheikh Muhammad bin Ahmad al-Atassi, the Mufti of Homs.
- Masoud Agha Suwaidan al-Husayni, ruler of Homs, renowned for his devotion and known for composing poetry in praise of the Prophet Muhammad.
- Muhammad Agha bin Masoud, governor of Hasiyah, who played an active role in stabilizing the region during the civil strife of 1860.
- Abd al-Majid Agha Suwaidan, governor of Hasiyah, widely known as “Amir al-Barr” (Prince of the Land), who represented the region in several political councils during the Syrian Revolt.

== Al-Suwaidan in Najd ==
The Najdi branch of the family descends from Sayyid Salim bin Hasan Agha bin Suleiman Agha Suwaidan al-Husayni. He pursued his studies under scholars in Damascus, Jerusalem, and the Hijaz, later settling in Al-Tuwaim in the Sudair region.

Notable descendants in Najd include:

- Salama bin Salim, ancestor of the Al-Nasser and Al-Salama families.
- Ali bin Salim, ancestor of Musa, Omar, Thunayan, Ibrahim, and Hamad. The descendants of Hamad form the line known today as Al-Ali.
