= Hamang Tunnel =

Road tunnel in Norway

Coordinates: 59.8963°N 10.5057°E

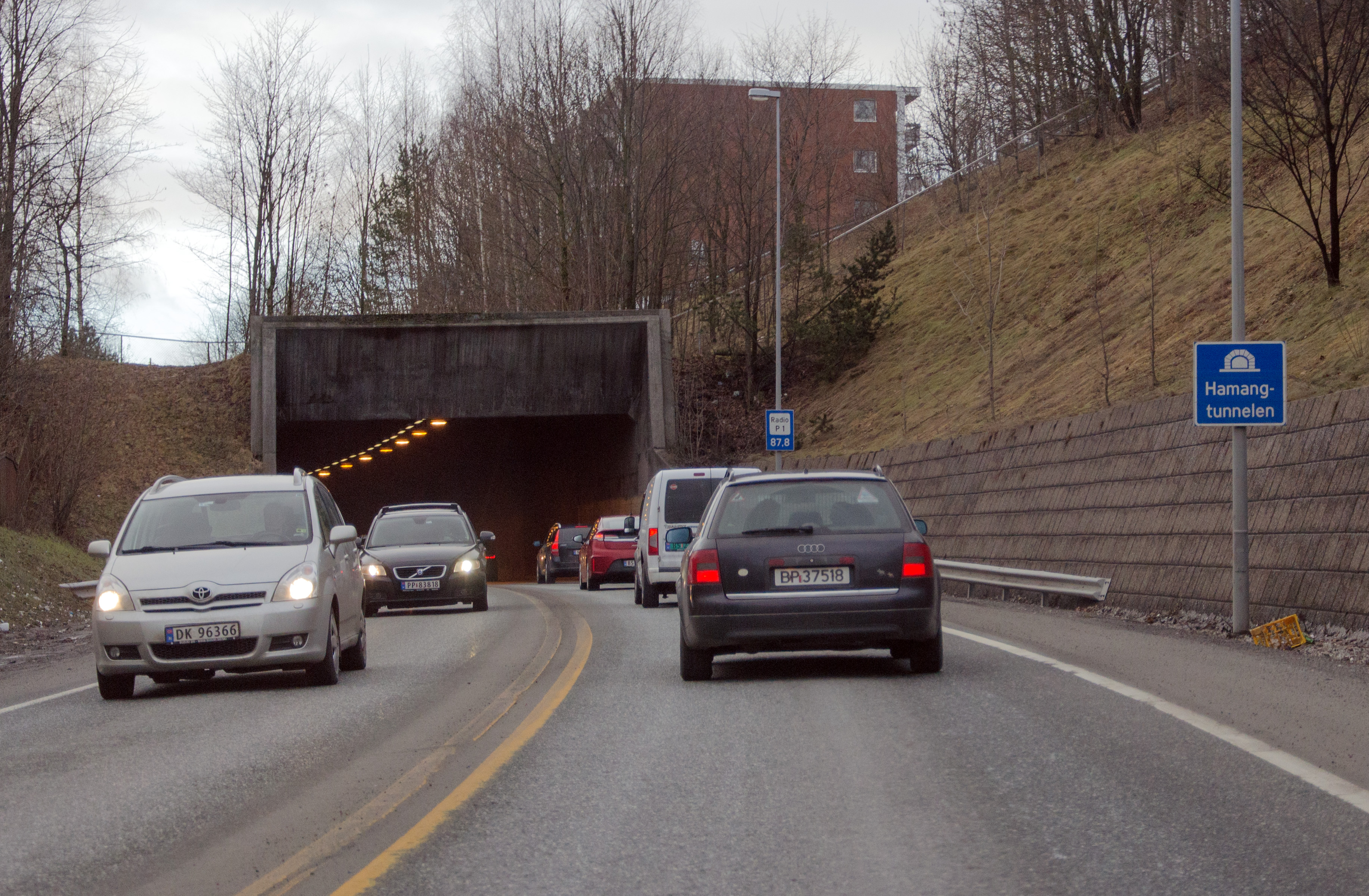
Hamangtunnelen.jpg

The Hamang Tunnel (Norwegian: Hamangtunnelen) is a road tunnel that runs under Hamang northwest of Sandvika in Norway. It forms a part of the European route E16. It was named Hamangporten in 1991, but the name was changed after two months at the demand of the Norwegian Public Roads Administration, who deemed the name Hamangporten to be "most unfortunate".
