= Asadiyeh, Razavi Khorasan =

Village in Razavi Khorasan province, Iran

Asadiyeh Persian: اسديه
- Village
- Location within Iran
- Coordinates: 35°37′11″N 59°25′26″E
- Country: Iran
- Province: Razavi Khorasan
- County: Torbat-e Heydarieh
- District: Jolgeh Rokh
- Rural District: Pain Rokh

Population (2016)
  - Total: 538
- Time zone: UTC+3:30 (IRST)

Asadiyeh (Persian: اسديه) (Note: Also romanized as Asadīyeh) is a village in Pain Rokh Rural District of Jolgeh Rokh District in Torbat-e Heydarieh County, Razavi Khorasan province, Iran.

== Demographics ==
=== Population ===
At the time of the 2006 National Census, the village's population was 551 in 135 households. The following census in 2011 counted 581 people in 151 households. The 2016 census measured the population of the village as 538 people in 151 households.
