= Armak, Hormozgan =

Armak ارمك
- Village
- Location within Iran
- Coordinates: 26°49′57″N 54°27′00″E
- Country: Iran
- Province: Hormozgan
- County: Bandar Lengeh
- Bakhsh: Central
- Rural District: Moghuyeh

Population (2006)
  - Total: 679
- Time zone: UTC+3:30 (IRST)

Armak (Persian: ارمك; also known as Armagh, Armakī, and Armaq) is a village in Moghuyeh Rural District, in the Central District of Bandar Lengeh County, Hormozgan Province, Iran. At the 2006 census, its population was 679, in 128 families.
