= Garmab, Torbat-e Heydarieh =

Village in Razavi Khorasan province, Iran

Garmab Persian: گرماب
- Village
- Location within Iran
- Coordinates: 35°42′20″N 59°14′29″E
- Country: Iran
- Province: Razavi Khorasan
- County: Torbat-e Heydarieh
- District: Jolgeh Rokh
- Rural District: Bala Rokh

Population (2016)
  - Total: 591
- Time zone: UTC+3:30 (IRST)

Garmab (Persian: گرماب) (Note: Also romanized as Garmāb) is a village in Bala Rokh Rural District of Jolgeh Rokh District in Torbat-e Heydarieh County, Razavi Khorasan province, Iran.

== Demographics ==
=== Population ===
At the time of the 2006 National Census, the village's population was 527 in 160 households. The following census in 2011 counted 557 people in 160 households. The 2016 census measured the population of the village as 591 people in 204 households.
