= Mahmudabad, Jolgeh Rokh =

Village in Razavi Khorasan province, Iran

Mahmudabad Persian: محموداباد
- Village
- Location within Iran
- Coordinates: 35°34′44″N 59°26′23″E
- Country: Iran
- Province: Razavi Khorasan
- County: Torbat-e Heydarieh
- District: Jolgeh Rokh
- Rural District: Pain Rokh

Population (2016)
  - Total: 305
- Time zone: UTC+3:30 (IRST)

Mahmudabad (Persian: محموداباد) (Note: Also romanized as Maḩmūdābād) is a village in Pain Rokh Rural District of Jolgeh Rokh District in Torbat-e Heydarieh County, Razavi Khorasan province, Iran.

== Demographics ==
=== Population ===
At the time of the 2006 National Census, the village's population was 298 in 70 households. The following census in 2011 counted 285 people in 79 households. The 2016 census measured the population of the village as 305 people in 92 households.
