= Hiru =

Hiru may refer to:

- Mount Hiru, mountain in Japan
- Hiru FM, Sri Lankan radio station
- Hiru, Hormozgan, a village in Iran
- Hiru, Lorestan, a village in Iran
