= Qesh Robat =

Village in Razavi Khorasan province, Iran

Qesh Robat Persian: قشرباط
- Village
- Location within Iran
- Coordinates: 35°35′04″N 59°26′34″E
- Country: Iran
- Province: Razavi Khorasan
- County: Torbat-e Heydarieh
- District: Jolgeh Rokh
- Rural District: Pain Rokh

Population (2016)
  - Total: 296
- Time zone: UTC+3:30 (IRST)

Qesh Robat (Persian: قشرباط) (Note: Also romanized as Qesh Robāţ and Qosh Robāţ; also known as Qashrābād) is a village in Pain Rokh Rural District of Jolgeh Rokh District in Torbat-e Heydarieh County, Razavi Khorasan province, Iran.

== Demographics ==
=== Population ===
At the time of the 2006 National Census, the village's population was 470 in 102 households. The following census in 2011 counted 346 people in 92 households. The 2016 census measured the population of the village as 296 people in 84 households.
