= Robat-e Mian Dasht =

Village in Razavi Khorasan province, Iran

Robat-e Mian Dasht Persian: رباطميان دشت
- Village
- Location within Iran
- Coordinates: 35°35′59″N 59°20′06″E
- Country: Iran
- Province: Razavi Khorasan
- County: Torbat-e Heydarieh
- District: Jolgeh Rokh
- Rural District: Pain Rokh

Population (2016)
  - Total: 686
- Time zone: UTC+3:30 (IRST)

Robat-e Mian Dasht (Persian: رباطميان دشت) (Note: Also romanized as Robāţ-e Meyāndasht and Robāţ-e Mīān Dasht; also known as Mīān Dasht) is a village in Pain Rokh Rural District of Jolgeh Rokh District in Torbat-e Heydarieh County, Razavi Khorasan province, Iran.

== Demographics ==
=== Population ===
At the time of the 2006 National Census, the village's population was 714 in 161 households. The following census in 2011 counted 727 people in 209 households. The 2016 census measured the population of the village as 686 people in 204 households.
