= Nezamiyeh, Iran =

Village in Razavi Khorasan province, Iran

Nezamiyeh Persian: نظاميه
- Village
- Location within Iran
- Coordinates: 35°36′05″N 59°15′34″E
- Country: Iran
- Province: Razavi Khorasan
- County: Torbat-e Heydarieh
- District: Jolgeh Rokh
- Rural District: Miyan Rokh

Population (2016)
  - Total: 503
- Time zone: UTC+3:30 (IRST)

Nezamiyeh (Persian: نظاميه) (Note: Also romanized as Nez̧āmīyeh; also known as Kūlābād) is a village in Miyan Rokh Rural District of Jolgeh Rokh District in Torbat-e Heydarieh County, Razavi Khorasan province, Iran.

== Demographics ==
=== Population ===
At the time of the 2006 National Census, the village's population was 441 in 105 households. The following census in 2011 counted 558 people in 133 households. The 2016 census measured the population of the village as 503 people in 151 households.
