= Hameyran =

Hameyran or Hamiran or Homeyran (Persian: حميران) may refer to:

- Hameyran, Bandar Lengeh
- Homeyran, Parsian
