= Khorram, Razavi Khorasan =

Village in Razavi Khorasan province, Iran

Khorram Persian: خرم
- Village
- Location within Iran
- Coordinates: 35°32′58″N 59°08′23″E
- Country: Iran
- Province: Razavi Khorasan
- County: Torbat-e Heydarieh
- District: Jolgeh Rokh
- Rural District: Miyan Rokh

Population (2016)
  - Total: 605
- Time zone: UTC+3:30 (IRST)

Khorram (Persian: خرم) is a village in Miyan Rokh Rural District of Jolgeh Rokh District in Torbat-e Heydarieh County, Razavi Khorasan province, Iran.

== Demographics ==
=== Population ===
At the time of the 2006 National Census, the village's population was 610 in 157 households. The following census in 2011 counted 594 people in 176 households. The 2016 census measured the population of the village as 605 people in 185 households.
