= Soltanabad, Torbat-e Heydarieh =

Village in Razavi Khorasan province, Iran

Soltanabad Persian: سلطان اباد
- Village
- Location within Iran
- Coordinates: 35°38′21″N 59°11′38″E
- Country: Iran
- Province: Razavi Khorasan
- County: Torbat-e Heydarieh
- District: Jolgeh Rokh
- Rural District: Bala Rokh

Population (2016)
  - Total: 2,078
- Time zone: UTC+3:30 (IRST)

Soltanabad (Persian: سلطان آباد رخ) (Note: Also known as Soltanabad-e Rokh (سلطان آباد رخ), also romanized as Solţānābād-e Rokh) is a village in Bala Rokh Rural District of Jolgeh Rokh District in Torbat-e Heydarieh County, Razavi Khorasan province, Iran.

== Demographics ==
=== Population ===
At the time of the 2006 National Census, the village's population was 1,763 in 416 households. The following census in 2011 counted 1,973 people in 575 households. The 2016 census measured the population of the village as 2,078 people in 662 households, the most populous in its rural district.
