= Pustin Duz, Razavi Khorasan =

Pustin Duz پوستین‌دوز
- Village
- Location within Iran
- Coordinates: 35°40′34″N 59°26′31″E
- Country: Iran
- Province: Razavi Khorasan
- County: Torbat-e Heydarieh
- Bakhsh: Jolgeh Rokh
- Rural District: Pain Rokh

Population (2006)
  - Total: 124
- Time zone: UTC+3:30 (IRST)
  - Summer (DST): UTC+4:30 (IRDT)

Pustin Duz (Persian: پوستین‌دوز, also Romanized as Pūstīn Dūz) is a village in Pain Rokh Rural District, Jolgeh Rokh District, Torbat-e Heydarieh County, Razavi Khorasan Province, Iran. At the 2006 census, its population was 124, in 24 families.
