= Milu =

Milu may refer to:

== People ==
- Milú (Maria de Lourdes de Almeida Lemos) (1926–2008), Portuguese actress and singer
- miLù, German singer who has worked with Schiller (band)

== Other uses ==
- Milü, an approximation for pi by Zu Chongzhi
- Milu (mythology), the ruler of Lua-o-Milu, the underworld
- Lua-o-Milu, the underworld in Hawaiian mythology
- Père David's Deer, milu (Chinese: 麋鹿; pinyin: mílù) or elaphure, Elaphurus davidianus, a Chinese species of deer known only in captivity
- Milu, Iran, a village in Hormozgan Province, Iran

== See also ==
- Snowy (character) (Milou in French), fictional character of Les Aventures de Tintin comic strip series
- Miru (disambiguation)
