= Nuri, Razavi Khorasan =

Village in Razavi Khorasan province, Iran

Nuri Persian: نوري
- Village
- Location within Iran
- Coordinates: 35°32′26″N 59°18′02″E
- Country: Iran
- Province: Razavi Khorasan
- County: Torbat-e Heydarieh
- District: Jolgeh Rokh
- Rural District: Miyan Rokh

Population (2016)
  - Total: 479
- Time zone: UTC+3:30 (IRST)

Nuri (Persian: نوری) (Note: Also romanized as Nūrī) is a village in Miyan Rokh Rural District of Jolgeh Rokh District in Torbat-e Heydarieh County, Razavi Khorasan province, Iran.

== Demographics ==
=== Population ===
At the time of the 2006 National Census, the village's population was 560 in 125 households. The following census in 2011 counted 421 people in 133 households. The 2016 census measured the population of the village as 479 people in 138 households.
