= Ahmadabad-e Khazai =

Village in Razavi Khorasan province, Iran

Ahmadabad-e Khazai Persian: احمدابادخزائي
- Village
- Location within Iran
- Coordinates: 35°37′25″N 59°28′48″E
- Country: Iran
- Province: Razavi Khorasan
- County: Torbat-e Heydarieh
- District: Jolgeh Rokh
- Rural District: Pain Rokh

Population (2016)
  - Total: 1,188
- Time zone: UTC+3:30 (IRST)

Ahmadabad-e Khazai (Persian: احمدابادخزائي) (Note: Also romanized as Aḩmadābād-e Khazā’ī; also known as Aḩmadābād) is a village in Pain Rokh Rural District of Jolgeh Rokh District in Torbat-e Heydarieh County, Razavi Khorasan province, Iran.

== Demographics ==
=== Population ===
At the time of the 2006 National Census, the village's population was 931 in 217 households. The following census in 2011 counted 950 people in 254 households. The 2016 census measured the population of the village as 1,188 people in 328 households.
