= Fakhrabad, Torbat-e Heydarieh =

Village in Razavi Khorasan province, Iran

Fakhrabad Persian: فخراباد
- Village
- Location within Iran
- Coordinates: 35°36′50″N 59°13′51″E
- Country: Iran
- Province: Razavi Khorasan
- County: Torbat-e Heydarieh
- District: Jolgeh Rokh
- Rural District: Bala Rokh

Population (2016)
  - Total: 639
- Time zone: UTC+3:30 (IRST)

Fakhrabad (Persian: فخراباد) (Note: Also romanized as Fakhrābād) is a village in Bala Rokh Rural District of Jolgeh Rokh District in Torbat-e Heydarieh County, Razavi Khorasan province, Iran.

== Demographics ==
=== Population ===
At the time of the 2006 National Census, the village's population was 646 in 170 households. The following census in 2011 counted 668 people in 203 households. The 2016 census measured the population of the village as 639 people in 196 households.
