= Javadiyeh, Torbat-e Heydarieh =

Village in Razavi Khorasan province, Iran

Javadiyeh Persian: جواديه
- Village
- Location within Iran
- Coordinates: 35°35′24″N 59°07′25″E
- Country: Iran
- Province: Razavi Khorasan
- County: Torbat-e Heydarieh
- District: Jolgeh Rokh
- Rural District: Miyan Rokh

Population (2016)
  - Total: 1,138
- Time zone: UTC+3:30 (IRST)

Javadiyeh (Persian: جواديه) (Note: Also romanized as Javādīyeh and Javādīyyeh) is a village in Miyan Rokh Rural District of Jolgeh Rokh District in Torbat-e Heydarieh County, Razavi Khorasan province, Iran.

== Demographics ==
=== Population ===
At the time of the 2006 National Census, the village's population was 1,210 in 275 households. The following census in 2011 counted 1,158 people in 310 households. The 2016 census measured the population of the village as 1,138 people in 343 households, the most populous in its rural district.
