= Rudkhaneh, Razavi Khorasan =

Village in Razavi Khorasan province, Iran

Rudkhaneh Persian: رودخانه
- Village
- Location within Iran
- Coordinates: 35°32′37″N 59°03′42″E
- Country: Iran
- Province: Razavi Khorasan
- County: Torbat-e Heydarieh
- District: Jolgeh Rokh
- Rural District: Miyan Rokh

Population (2016)
  - Total: 819
- Time zone: UTC+3:30 (IRST)

Rudkhaneh (Persian: رودخانه) (Note: Also romanized as Rūdkhāneh) is a village in Miyan Rokh Rural District of Jolgeh Rokh District in Torbat-e Heydarieh County, Razavi Khorasan province, Iran.

== Demographics ==
=== Population ===
At the time of the 2006 National Census, the village's population was 844 in 218 households. The following census in 2011 counted 883 people in 261 households. The 2016 census measured the population of the village as 819 people in 261 households.
