= Kalateh-ye Som =

Village in Razavi Khorasan province, Iran

Kalateh-ye Som Persian: كلاته ثم
- Village
- Location within Iran
- Coordinates: 35°43′48″N 59°10′01″E
- Country: Iran
- Province: Razavi Khorasan
- County: Torbat-e Heydarieh
- District: Jolgeh Rokh
- Rural District: Bala Rokh

Population (2016)
  - Total: 251
- Time zone: UTC+3:30 (IRST)

Kalateh-ye Som (Persian: كلاته ثم) (Note: Also romanized as Kalāteh-ye Sam and Kalāteh-ye S̄om) is a village in Bala Rokh Rural District of Jolgeh Rokh District in Torbat-e Heydarieh County, Razavi Khorasan province, Iran.

== Demographics ==
=== Population ===
At the time of the 2006 National Census, the village's population was 245 in 74 households. The following census in 2011 counted 192 people in 60 households. The 2016 census measured the population of the village as 251 people in 84 households.
