= Asadabad, Jolgeh Rokh =

Village in Razavi Khorasan province, Iran

Asadabad Persian: اسداباد
- Village
- Location within Iran
- Coordinates: 35°37′54″N 59°21′32″E
- Country: Iran
- Province: Razavi Khorasan
- County: Torbat-e Heydarieh
- District: Jolgeh Rokh
- Rural District: Pain Rokh

Population (2016)
  - Total: 787
- Time zone: UTC+3:30 (IRST)

Asadabad (Persian: اسداباد) (Note: Also romanized as Asadābād; also known as Qal’eh Shāhzādeh) is a village in Pain Rokh Rural District of Jolgeh Rokh District in Torbat-e Heydarieh County, Razavi Khorasan province, Iran.

== Demographics ==
=== Population ===
At the time of the 2006 National Census, the village's population was 751 in 192 households. The following census in 2011 counted 843 people in 225 households. The 2016 census measured the population of the village as 787 people in 231 households.
