= Chahar Takht-e Kuk =

Chahar Takht-e Kuk چهارتخته كوك
- Village
- Location within Iran
- Coordinates: 35°37′53″N 59°04′29″E
- Country: Iran
- Province: Razavi Khorasan
- County: Torbat-e Heydarieh
- Bakhsh: Jolgeh Rokh
- Rural District: Mian Rokh

Population (2006)
  - Total: 268
- Time zone: UTC+3:30 (IRST)
  - Summer (DST): UTC+4:30 (IRDT)

Chahar Takht-e Kuk (Persian: چهارتخته كوك, also Romanized as Chahār Takht-e Kūk and Chahār Takht-e Gūk; also known as Chahār Takhteh Gūk) is a village in Mian Rokh Rural District, Jolgeh Rokh District, Torbat-e Heydarieh County, Razavi Khorasan Province, Iran. At the 2006 census, its population was 268, in 62 families.
