= Yek Lengeh-ye Olya =

Village in Razavi Khorasan province, Iran

Yek Lengeh-ye Olya Persian: يك لنگي عليا
- Village
- Location within Iran
- Coordinates: 35°43′20″N 59°07′51″E
- Country: Iran
- Province: Razavi Khorasan
- County: Torbat-e Heydarieh
- District: Jolgeh Rokh
- Rural District: Bala Rokh

Population (2016)
  - Total: 562
- Time zone: UTC+3:30 (IRST)

Yek Lengeh-ye Olya (Persian: يك لنگي عليا) (Note: Also romanized as Yek Lengeh-ye ‘Olyā; also known as Yek Lengeh) is a village in Bala Rokh Rural District of Jolgeh Rokh District in Torbat-e Heydarieh County, Razavi Khorasan province, Iran.

== Demographics ==
=== Population ===
At the time of the 2006 National Census, the village's population was 570 in 138 households. The following census in 2011 counted 543 people in 162 households. The 2016 census measured the population of the village as 562 people in 180 households.
