= Gavmir =

Gavmir (Persian: گاومير), also rendered Gamir, may refer to:

- Gavmir, Khuzestan, Iran

== See also ==
- Gavmiri, Iran
