= Derakht-e Senjed, Torbat-e Heydarieh =

Village in Razavi Khorasan province, Iran

Derakht-e Senjed Persian: درخت سنجد
- Village
- Location within Iran
- Coordinates: 35°44′17″N 59°06′44″E
- Country: Iran
- Province: Razavi Khorasan
- County: Torbat-e Heydarieh
- District: Jolgeh Rokh
- Rural District: Bala Rokh

Population (2016)
  - Total: 681
- Time zone: UTC+3:30 (IRST)

Derakht-e Senjed (Persian: درخت سنجد) is a village in Bala Rokh Rural District of Jolgeh Rokh District in Torbat-e Heydarieh County, Razavi Khorasan province, Iran.

== Demographics ==
=== Population ===
At the time of the 2006 National Census, the village's population was 679 in 117 households. The following census in 2011 counted 597 people in 134 households. The 2016 census measured the population of the village as 681 people in 165 households.
