= Chiru (disambiguation) =

Chiru is an alternate name for the Tibetan antelope.

It may also refer to:

- Chiru people, of Manipur, India
- Chiru language, their Southern Naga (Sino-Tibetan) language
- Chiru, an alternate name for Bandar-e Chiruiyeh, a village in Iran
- Chiru, the lead character in the 2010 Indian film Chirru
- Chiru, a nickname for the Indian actor Chiranjeevi
