= Siyak =

Siyak may refer to:

- Siyaka, a 10th-century Paramara king of central India
- Sihag, a clan of India
- Tonb-e Siyak, a village in Iran
