= Sar Bala, Razavi Khorasan =

Village in Razavi Khorasan province, Iran

Sar Bala Persian: سربالا
- Village
- Location within Iran
- Coordinates: 35°31′56″N 59°21′18″E
- Country: Iran
- Province: Razavi Khorasan
- County: Torbat-e Heydarieh
- District: Jolgeh Rokh
- Rural District: Pain Rokh

Population (2016)
  - Total: 1,956
- Time zone: UTC+3:30 (IRST)

Sar Bala (Persian: سربالا) (Note: Also romanized as Sar Bālā) is a village in, and the capital of, Pain Rokh Rural District in Jolgeh Rokh District of Torbat-e Heydarieh County, Razavi Khorasan province, Iran. The previous capital of the rural district was the village of Nasar, now a city.

== Demographics ==
=== Population ===
At the time of the 2006 National Census, the village's population was 1,688 in 424 households. The following census in 2011 counted 1,847 people in 534 households. The 2016 census measured the population of the village as 1,956 people in 584 households.
