= Pustin Duz =

Pustin Duz (Persian: پوستین‌دوز) may refer to:

- Pustin Duz, North Khorasan
- Pustin Duz, Razavi Khorasan
