= Heshmatabad, Torbat-e Heydarieh =

Village in Razavi Khorasan province, Iran

Heshmatabad Persian: حشمت اباد
- Village
- Location within Iran
- Coordinates: 35°34′15″N 59°15′36″E
- Country: Iran
- Province: Razavi Khorasan
- County: Torbat-e Heydarieh
- District: Jolgeh Rokh
- Rural District: Miyan Rokh

Population (2016)
  - Total: 578
- Time zone: UTC+3:30 (IRST)

Heshmatabad (Persian: حشمت اباد) (Note: Also romanized as Hashmatābād and Ḩeshmatābād) is a village in Miyan Rokh Rural District of Jolgeh Rokh District in Torbat-e Heydarieh County, Razavi Khorasan province, Iran.

== Demographics ==
=== Population ===
At the time of the 2006 National Census, the village's population was 537 in 131 households. The following census in 2011 counted 565 people in 155 households. The 2016 census measured the population of the village as 578 people in 182 households.
