= Qajaq =

Village in Razavi Khorasan province, Iran

Qajaq Persian: قجاق
- Village
- Location within Iran
- Coordinates: 35°32′52″N 59°15′44″E
- Country: Iran
- Province: Razavi Khorasan
- County: Torbat-e Heydarieh
- District: Jolgeh Rokh
- Rural District: Miyan Rokh

Population (2016)
  - Total: 305
- Time zone: UTC+3:30 (IRST)

Qajaq (Persian: قجاق) (Note: Also romanized as Qajāq) is a village in Miyan Rokh Rural District of Jolgeh Rokh District in Torbat-e Heydarieh County, Razavi Khorasan province, Iran.

== Demographics ==
=== Population ===
At the time of the 2006 National Census, the village's population was 359 in 87 households. The following census in 2011 counted 300 people in 87 households. The 2016 census measured the population of the village as 305 people in 92 households.
