= Tonb-e Siyak =

Tonb-e Siyak تنب سيك
- Village
- Location within Iran
- Coordinates: 26°57′49″N 55°15′59″E
- Country: Iran
- Province: Hormozgan
- County: Bandar Lengeh
- Bakhsh: Central
- Rural District: Dezhgan

Population (2006)
  - Total: 209
- Time zone: UTC+3:30 (IRST)
  - Summer (DST): UTC+4:30 (IRDT)

Tonb-e Siyak (Persian: تنب سيك, also Romanized as Tonb-e Sīyak) is a village in Dezhgan Rural District, in the Central District of Bandar Lengeh County, Hormozgan Province, Iran. At the 2006 census, its population was 209, in 48 families.
