= Nasar, Iran =

City in Razavi Khorasan province, Iran

Nasar Persian: نسر
- City
- Location within Iran
- Coordinates: 35°31′28″N 59°26′31″E
- Country: Iran
- Province: Razavi Khorasan
- County: Torbat-e Heydarieh
- District: Jolgeh Rokh
- Established as a city: 2021

Population (2016)
  - Total: 3,633
- Time zone: UTC+3:30 (IRST)

Nasar (Persian: نسر) (Note: Also romanized as Nasr; also known as Naşr-e Qūrlas, Naşr-e Qūrlāsan, and Nasr-i-Qurlās) is a city in Jolgeh Rokh District of Torbat-e Heydarieh County, Razavi Khorasan province, Iran. As a village, it was the capital of Pain Rokh Rural District until its capital was transferred to the village of Sar Bala.

== Demographics ==
=== Population ===
At the time of the 2006 National Census, Nasar's population was 3,403 in 876 households, when it was a village in Pain Rokh Rural District. The following census in 2011 counted 3,402 people in 998 households. The 2016 census measured the population of the village as 3,633 people in 1,088 households. It was the most populous village in its rural district.

The village of Nasar was converted to a city in 2021.
