= Miru =

Miru may refer to:

- Miru (goddess), a death goddess in Polynesian mythology
- Miru, Iran, a village in Bandar Abbas County, Hormozgan Province, Iran
- Miru River, a river of Romania
- Miru, a character from the Pac-Man franchise, introduced in Pac & Pal

== People with the given name ==
- Miru Kim (born 1981), American photographer
- Miru Shiroma (born 1997), Japanese singer

== See also ==
- Milu (disambiguation)
