= Sarhang, Razavi Khorasan =

Village in Razavi Khorasan province, Iran

Sarhang Persian: سرهنگ
- Village
- Location within Iran
- Coordinates: 35°39′13″N 59°15′51″E
- Country: Iran
- Province: Razavi Khorasan
- County: Torbat-e Heydarieh
- District: Jolgeh Rokh
- Rural District: Bala Rokh

Population (2016)
  - Total: 807
- Time zone: UTC+3:30 (IRST)

Sarhang (Persian: سرهنگ) is a village in, and the capital of, Bala Rokh Rural District in Jolgeh Rokh District of Torbat-e Heydarieh County, Razavi Khorasan province, Iran.

== Demographics ==
=== Population ===
At the time of the 2006 National Census, the village's population was 684 in 182 households. The following census in 2011 counted 851 people in 203 households. The 2016 census measured the population of the village as 807 people in 252 households.
