= Kong, Iran =

City in Hormozgan province, Iran

Kong Persian: كنگ
- City
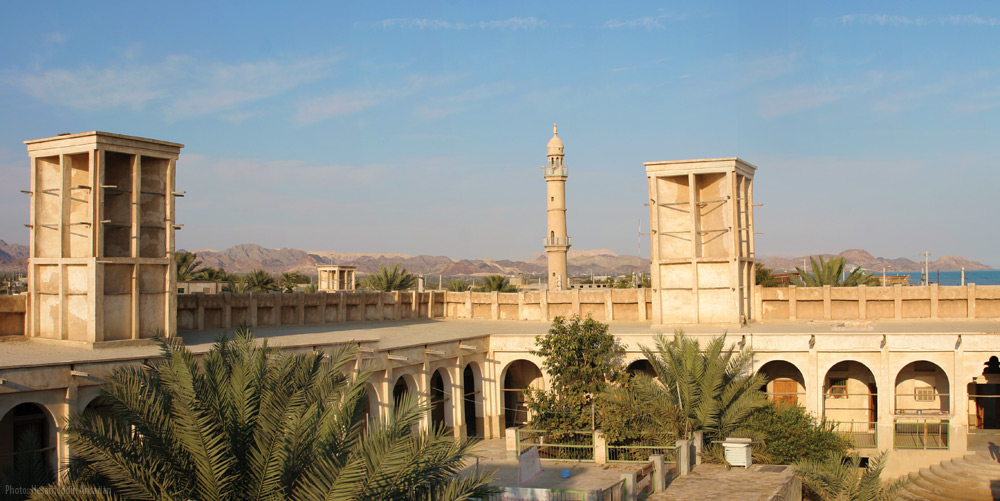

- Location within Iran
- Coordinates: 26°35′41″N 54°56′17″E
- Country: Iran
- Province: Hormozgan
- County: Bandar Lengeh
- District: Central

Population (2016)
  - Total: 19,213
- Time zone: UTC+3:30 (IRST)

Kong (Persian: كنگ) (Note: Also known as Bandar-e Gong, Bandar-e Kong, Gong, and Kung) is a city in the Central District of Bandar Lengeh County, Hormozgan province, Iran.

At the time of the 2006 National Census, the city's population was 14,881 in 2,908 households. The following census in 2011 counted 16,496 people in 4,009 households. The 2016 census measured the population of the city as 19,213 people in 4,921 households.

From April 5 through 6, 2026, amidst the 2026 Iran war, strikes hit both Kong and the nearby city of Bandar Lengeh. Combined, the strikes killed 6 people and wounded 17 others.
