= Bandar Charak =

City in Hormozgan province, Iran

- City
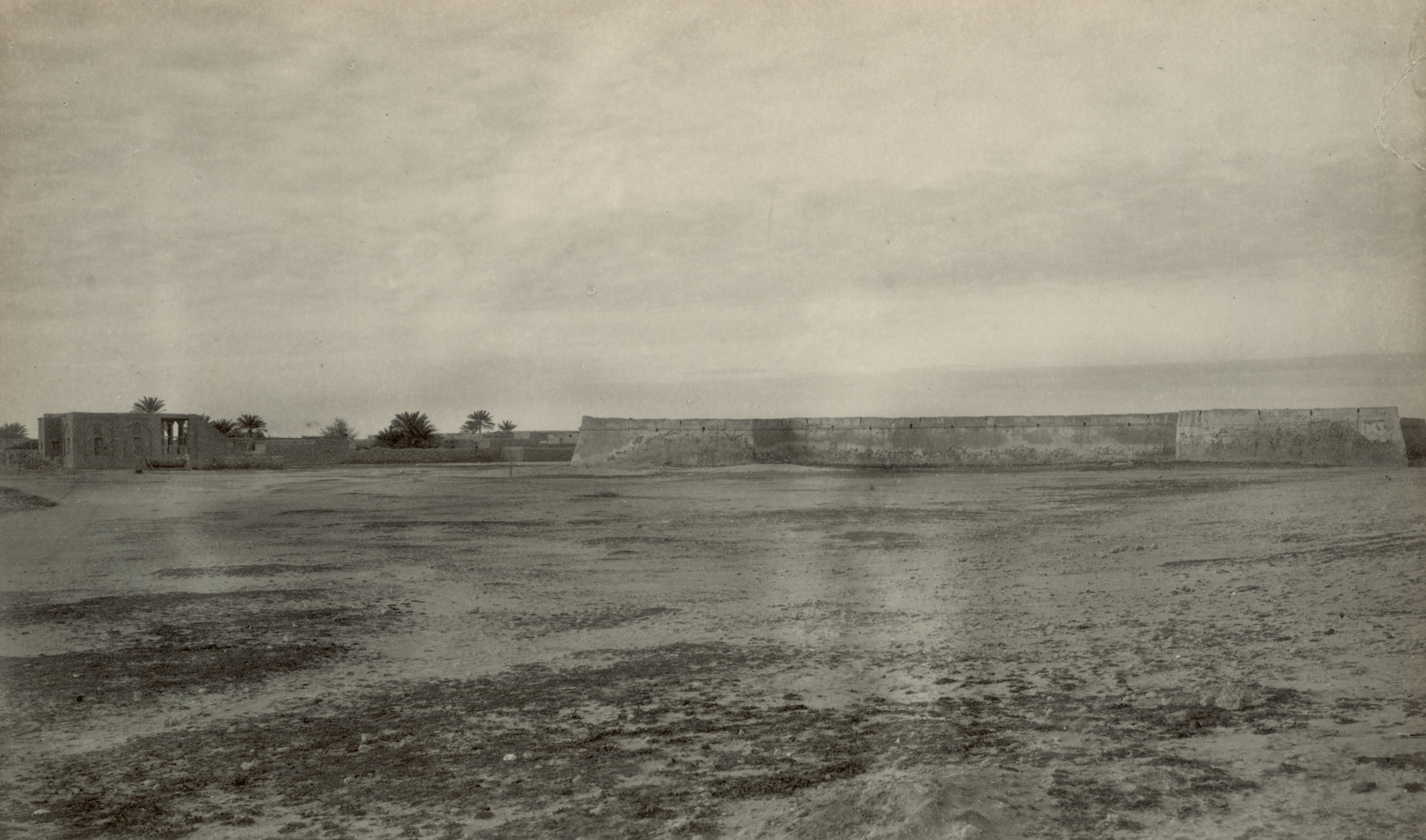
- The local Fort, a photograph by John Thomson in the 1880s

- Location within Iran
- Coordinates: 26°44′02″N 54°16′28″E
- Country: Iran
- Province: Hormozgan
- County: Bandar Lengeh
- District: Shibkaveh

Population (2016)
  - Total: 4,066
- Time zone: UTC+3:30 (IRST)

Bandar Charak (Persian: بندر چارک) (Note: Also romanized as Bandar-e Chārak and Band-e Chārak; also known as Chārak) is a coastal city in, and the capital of, Shibkaveh District of Bandar Lengeh County, Hormozgan province, Iran. It also serves as the administrative center for Bandar Charak Rural District.

== Demographics ==
=== Language ===
More than half of the city speaks Gulf Arabic.

=== Population ===
At the time of the 2006 National Census, the city's population was 2,958 in 609 households. The following census in 2011 counted 3,758 people in 711 households. The 2016 census measured the population of the city as 4,066 people in 1,049 households.
