= Robat-e Sang =

City in Razavi Khorasan province, Iran

Robat-e Sang Persian: رباطسنگ
- City
- Location within Iran
- Coordinates: 35°32′48″N 59°11′44″E
- Country: Iran
- Province: Razavi Khorasan
- County: Torbat-e Heydarieh
- District: Jolgeh Rokh

Population (2016)
  - Total: 1,551
- Time zone: UTC+3:30 (IRST)

Robat-e Sang (Persian: رباطسنگ) (Note: Also romanized as Robāt Sang) is a city in, and the capital of, Jolgeh Rokh District in Torbat-e Heydarieh County, Razavi Khorasan province, Iran. It also serves as the administrative center for Miyan Rokh Rural District.

== Demographics ==
=== Population ===
At the time of the 2006 National Census, the city's population was 1,344 in 384 households. The following census in 2011 counted 1,721 people in 462 households. The 2016 census measured the population of the city as 1,551 people in 457 households.
