= Hashem (disambiguation) =

HaShem is a title used in Judaism to refer to God.

Hashem is also a widely used name in other contexts.

== People with the given name ==
- Hashem Aghajari (born 1957), Iranian historian
- Hashem Akbari (born 1949), Iranian-American professor at Concordia University
- Hashem Akbarian (1897–1971), Iranian wrestler
- Mirza Hashem Amoli (1899–1993), Iranian ayatollah
- Hashem Beikzadeh (born 1984), Iranian footballer
- Hashem Kolahi (1956–2024), Iranian Olympic wrestler
- M. Hashem Pesaran (born 1946), British-Iranian economist
- Hashem Safieddine (1964–2024), Lebanese Shia cleric and Hezbollah militant leader
- Mohammad Hashem Taufiqui (1942–2021), Afghan politician

== People with the surname ==
- Abdullah Hashem (born 1983), Egyptian-American religious leader and founder of the Ahmadi Religion of Peace and Light
- Ibrahim Hashem (1888–1958), Jordanian lawyer and politician
- Nadia Hashem (died 2023), Jordanian journalist and politician

== Other uses ==
- Banu Hashim – Clan of the Quraysh tribe and clan of Muhammad
- Hasham
