= Vaset, Kerman =

Vaset واسط
- Village
- Location within Iran
- Coordinates: 30°47′44″N 56°26′40″E
- Country: Iran
- Province: Kerman
- County: Zarand
- Bakhsh: Central
- Rural District: Mohammadabad

Population (2006)
  - Total: 817
- Time zone: UTC+3:30 (IRST)
  - Summer (DST): UTC+4:30 (IRDT)

Vaset (Persian: واسط, also Romanized as Vāseţ) is a village in Mohammadabad Rural District, in the Central District of Zarand County, Kerman Province, Iran. As of the 2006 census, its population was 817 people from 186 families.
