= Hasham Kuh =

Hasham Kuh حشم كوه
- Village
- Country: Iran
- Province: Hormozgan
- County: Hajjiabad
- Bakhsh: Ahmadi
- Rural District: Ahmadi
- Time zone: UTC+3:30 (IRST)
  - Summer (DST): UTC+4:30 (IRDT)

Hasham Kuh (Persian: حشم كوه, also Romanized as Ḩashām Kūh) is a village in Ahmadi Rural District, Ahmadi District, Hajjiabad County, Hormozgan Province, Iran.

The existence of this village was noted in the 2006 Census of Iran. Its population at the time was 440, from 103 families.
