= Sang-e Siah, Razavi Khorasan =

Sang-e Siah سنگ سياه
- Village
- Location within Iran
- Coordinates: 36°31′19″N 59°23′31″E
- Country: Iran
- Province: Razavi Khorasan
- County: Mashhad
- Bakhsh: Central
- Rural District: Miyan Velayat

Population (2006)
  - Total: 597
- Time zone: UTC+3:30 (IRST)
  - Summer (DST): UTC+4:30 (IRDT)

Sang-e Siah (Persian: سنگ سياه, also Romanized as Sang-e Sīāh) is a village in Miyan Velayat Rural District, in the Central District of Mashhad County, Razavi Khorasan Province, Iran. At the 2006 census, its population was 597, in 140 families.
