= Mehregan, Kerman =

Mehregan مهرگان
- Village
- Location within Iran
- Coordinates: 28°58′27″N 57°53′57″E
- Country: Iran
- Province: Kerman
- County: Jiroft
- Bakhsh: Jebalbarez
- Rural District: Maskun

Population (2006)
  - Total: 36
- Time zone: UTC+3:30 (IRST)
  - Summer (DST): UTC+4:30 (IRDT)

Mehregan (Persian: مهرگان, also Romanized as Mehregān and Mehrgān) is a village in Maskun Rural District, Jebalbarez District, Jiroft County, Kerman Province, Iran. At the 2006 census, its population was 36, in 10 families.
