= Tom Baluchan =

Tom Baluchan تم بلوچان
- Village
- Location within Iran
- Coordinates: 27°06′18″N 57°00′57″E
- Country: Iran
- Province: Hormozgan
- County: Minab
- Bakhsh: Central
- Rural District: Band-e Zarak

Population (2006)
  - Total: 195
- Time zone: UTC+3:30 (IRST)
  - Summer (DST): UTC+4:30 (IRDT)

Tom Baluchan (Persian: تم بلوچان, also Romanized as Tom Balūchān; also known as Tonb Balūchān and Towm-e Balūchān) is a village in Band-e Zarak Rural District, in the Central District of Minab County, Hormozgan Province, Iran. At the 2006 census, its population was 195, in 46 families.
