= Hashim =

- Pronunciation: Arabic: [haːʃɪm]
- Gender: Male

Origin
- Origin: Arabic
- Meaning: crusher, breaker

Other names
- Alternative spelling: Hachem, Hashem, Hasham, Hasyim

Hashim (Arabic: هاشم) is a common male Arabic given name.

Notable people with the name include:

- Hashim ibn Abd Manaf
- Hashim Amir Ali
- Hashim Shah
- Hashim Amla
- Hashim Thaçi
- Hashim Khan
- Mir Hashim Ali Khan
- Hashim al-Atassi
- Hashim ibn Utbah
- Prince Hashim bin Hussein
- Prince Hashim bin Abdullah

People using it in their patronymic include:

- Asad ibn Hashim
- Sulaiman bin Hashim

Stage names:

- Hashim, stage name of American musician Jerry Calliste Jr.

Names in which Hashim is a compound:

- Abul Hashem, multiple people

== See also ==
- Banu Hashim, clan named after Hashim ibn Abd Manaf
- Hashem
- Hasham
