= Archdiocese of Armagh =

Archdiocese of Armagh may refer to:

- Roman Catholic Archdiocese of Armagh
- Diocese of Armagh (Church of Ireland)

== See also ==
- Archbishop of Armagh, two archiepiscopal titles, one in the Catholic Church and the other in the Church of Ireland
