= Hasteh Kuh, Kohgiluyeh and Boyer-Ahmad =

Hasteh Kuh هسته كوه
- Village
- Location within Iran
- Coordinates: 30°20′53″N 51°00′38″E
- Country: Iran
- Province: Kohgiluyeh and Boyer-Ahmad
- County: Gachsaran
- Bakhsh: Central
- Rural District: Emamzadeh Jafar

Population (2006)
  - Total: 37
- Time zone: UTC+3:30 (IRST)
  - Summer (DST): UTC+4:30 (IRDT)

Hasteh Kuh (Persian: هسته كوه, also Romanized as Hasteh Kūh; also known as Hastegān, Hastekān, and Ḩastekān) is a village in Emamzadeh Jafar Rural District, in the Central District of Gachsaran County, Kohgiluyeh and Boyer-Ahmad Province, Iran. At the 2006 census, its population was 37, in 9 families.
