= Jabri, Bushehr =

Jabri جبري
- Village
- Location within Iran
- Coordinates: 28°27′05″N 51°18′28″E
- Country: Iran
- Province: Bushehr
- County: Dashti
- Bakhsh: Central
- Rural District: Khvormuj

Population (2006)
  - Total: 22
- Time zone: UTC+3:30 (IRST)
  - Summer (DST): UTC+4:30 (IRDT)

Jabri (Persian: جبري, also Romanized as Jabrī) is a village in Khvormuj Rural District, in the Central District of Dashti County, Bushehr Province, Iran. At the 2006 census, its population was 22, in 5 families.
