= Podol, Nikolsky District, Vologda Oblast =

Podol Подол
- Village
- Location within Vologda Oblast Location within Russia
- Coordinates: 59°41′N 45°20′E
- Country: Russia
- Region: Vologda Oblast
- District: Nikolsky District
- Time zone: UTC+3:00

Podol (Russian: Подол) is a rural locality (a village) in Terebayevskoye Rural Settlement, Nikolsky District, Vologda Oblast, Russia. The population was 19 as of 2002.

== Geography ==
Podol is located 25 km northwest of Nikolsk (the district's administrative centre) by road. Vyrypayevo is the nearest rural locality.
