= Chahar Takhteh, Lorestan =

Chahar Takhteh چهارتخته
- Village
- Location within Iran
- Coordinates: 33°47′46″N 48°18′06″E
- Country: Iran
- Province: Lorestan
- County: Selseleh
- Bakhsh: Central
- Rural District: Honam

Population (2006)
  - Total: 191
- Time zone: UTC+3:30 (IRST)
  - Summer (DST): UTC+4:30 (IRDT)

Chahar Takhteh (Persian: چهارتخته, also Romanized as Chahār Takhteh) is a village in Honam Rural District, in the Central District of Selseleh County, Lorestan Province, Iran. At the 2006 census, its population was 191, in 40 families.
