= Kandaran, Fars =

Kandaran كندران
- Village
- Location within Iran
- Coordinates: 29°02′45″N 52°35′38″E
- Country: Iran
- Province: Fars
- County: Firuzabad
- Bakhsh: Meymand
- Rural District: Khvajehei

Population (2006)
  - Total: 109
- Time zone: UTC+3:30 (IRST)
  - Summer (DST): UTC+4:30 (IRDT)

Kandaran (Persian: كندران, also Romanized as Kandarān; also known as Kantarūn) is a village in Khvajehei Rural District, Meymand District, Firuzabad County, Fars province, Iran. At the 2006 census, its population was 109, in 23 families.
