= Gerisheh-ye Sofla =

Gerisheh-ye Sofla گريشه سفلي
- Village
- Location within Iran
- Coordinates: 34°47′16″N 46°08′27″E
- Country: Iran
- Province: Kermanshah
- County: Salas-e Babajani
- Bakhsh: Central
- Rural District: Dasht-e Hor

Population (2006)
  - Total: 49
- Time zone: UTC+3:30 (IRST)
  - Summer (DST): UTC+4:30 (IRDT)

Gerisheh-ye Sofla (Persian: گريشه سفلي, also Romanized as Gerīsheh-ye Soflá; also known as Gerūsheh-ye Soflá) is a village in Dasht-e Hor Rural District, in the Central District of Salas-e Babajani County, Kermanshah Province, Iran. At the 2006 census, its population was 49, in 11 families.
