= Tom-e Khvajeh Bahmani =

Tom-e Khvajeh Bahmani تم خواجه بهمني
- Village
- Location within Iran
- Coordinates: 27°04′28″N 57°03′40″E
- Country: Iran
- Province: Hormozgan
- County: Minab
- Bakhsh: Central
- Rural District: Band-e Zarak

Population (2006)
  - Total: 82
- Time zone: UTC+3:30 (IRST)
  - Summer (DST): UTC+4:30 (IRDT)

Tom-e Khvajeh Bahmani (Persian: تم خواجه بهمني, also Romanized as Tom-e Khvājeh Bahmanī; also known as Tonb-e Khvājeh Bahman) is a village in Band-e Zarak Rural District, in the Central District of Minab County, Hormozgan Province, Iran. At the 2006 census, its population was 82, in 14 families.
