= Mehregan, Kermanshah =

Mehregan مهرگان
- Village
- Location within Iran
- Coordinates: 34°41′54″N 46°43′06″E
- Country: Iran
- Province: Kermanshah
- County: Ravansar
- Bakhsh: Central
- Rural District: Badr

Population (2006)
  - Total: 263
- Time zone: UTC+3:30 (IRST)
  - Summer (DST): UTC+4:30 (IRDT)

Mehregan (Persian: مهرگان, also Romanized as Mehregān) is a village in Badr Rural District, in the Central District of Ravansar County, Kermanshah Province, Iran. At the 2006 census, its population was 263, in 45 families.
