= Tonb Bariku =

Tonb Bariku تنب باريكو
- Village
- Location within Iran
- Coordinates: 27°38′10″N 56°45′30″E
- Country: Iran
- Province: Hormozgan
- County: Bandar Abbas
- Bakhsh: shamil
- Rural District: Shamil

Population (2006)
  - Total: 84
- Time zone: UTC+3:30 (IRST)
  - Summer (DST): UTC+4:30 (IRDT)

Tomb Bariku (Persian: تنب باريكو, also Romanized as Tonb Bārīkū; also known as Dam Bārīkū, Dom Bārīkū, and Tam Bārīkū-ye Poshtkūh) is a village in poshtkuh-e shamil .Farsi. پشتکوه شمیل Shamil Rural District, shamil District, Bandar Abbas County, Hormozgan Province, Iran. At the 2006 census, its population was 84, in 20 families.
