= Mehran District =

District in Hormozgan province, Iran

Mehran District Persian: بخش مهران
- District
- Location within Iran
- Coordinates: 26°56′15″N 55°08′20″E
- Country: Iran
- Province: Hormozgan
- County: Bandar Lengeh
- Capital: Lamazan

Population (2016)
  - Total: 20,321
- Time zone: UTC+3:30 (IRST)

Mehran District (Persian: بخش مهران) is in Bandar Lengeh County, Hormozgan province, Iran. Its capital is the city of Lamazan.

== History ==
After the 2006 National Census, Dezhgan and Mehran Rural Districts were separated from the Central District in the formation of Mehran District. After the 2011 census, the village of Lamazan was elevated to the status of a city.

== Demographics ==
=== Population ===
At the time of the 2011 census, the district's population was 4,479 households. The 2016 census measured the population of the district as 20,321 inhabitants in 5,377 households.

=== Administrative divisions ===
Mehran District Population
Administrative Divisions	2011	2016
Dezhgan RD	9,304	10,304
Mehran RD	9,358	7,272
Lamazan (city)		2,745
Total	18,662	20,321
RD = Rural District
