= Bala Rokh Rural District =

Rural district in Razavi Khorasan province, Iran

Bala Rokh Rural District Persian: دهستان بالارخ
- Rural District
- Location within Iran
- Coordinates: 35°43′N 59°16′E
- Country: Iran
- Province: Razavi Khorasan
- County: Torbat-e Heydarieh
- District: Jolgeh Rokh
- Established: 1987
- Capital: Sarhang

Population (2016)
  - Total: 7,825
- Time zone: UTC+3:30 (IRST)

Bala Rokh Rural District (Persian: دهستان بالارخ) is in Jolgeh Rokh District of Torbat-e Heydarieh County, Razavi Khorasan province, Iran. Its capital is the village of Sarhang.

== Demographics ==
=== Population ===
At the time of the 2006 National Census, the rural district's population was 7,483 in 1,891 households. There were 7,565 inhabitants in 2,151 households at the following census of 2011. The 2016 census measured the population of the rural district as 7,825 in 2,459 households. The most populous of its 54 villages was Soltanabad, with 2,078 people.

=== Other villages in the rural district ===
- Alaqeh
- Derakht-e Senjed
- Fakhrabad
- Garmab
- Kalateh-ye Som
- Yek Lengeh-ye Olya
