= Miyan Rokh Rural District =

Rural district in Razavi Khorasan province, Iran

Miyan Rokh Rural District Persian: دهستان ميان رخ
- Rural District
- Location within Iran
- Coordinates: 35°34′N 59°12′E
- Country: Iran
- Province: Razavi Khorasan
- County: Torbat-e Heydarieh
- District: Jolgeh Rokh
- Established: 1987
- Capital: Robat-e Sang

Population (2016)
  - Total: 5,686
- Time zone: UTC+3:30 (IRST)

Miyan Rokh Rural District (Persian: دهستان ميان رخ) is in Jolgeh Rokh District of Torbat-e Heydarieh County, Razavi Khorasan province, Iran. It is administered from the city of Robat-e Sang.

== Demographics ==
=== Population ===
At the time of the 2006 National Census, the rural district's population was 5,903 in 1,429 households. There were 6,162 inhabitants in 1,740 households at the following census of 2011. The 2016 census measured the population of the rural district as 5,686 in 1,765 households. The most populous of its 52 villages was Javadiyeh, with 1,138 people.

=== Other villages in the rural district ===
- Heshmatabad
- Khorram
- Nezamiyeh
- Nuri
- Qajaq
- Rudkhaneh
