= Pain Rokh Rural District =

Rural district in Razavi Khorasan province, Iran

Pain Rokh Rural District Persian: دهستان پائين رخ
- Rural District
- Location within Iran
- Coordinates: 35°36′N 59°26′E
- Country: Iran
- Province: Razavi Khorasan
- County: Torbat-e Heydarieh
- District: Jolgeh Rokh
- Established: 1987
- Capital: Sar Bala

Population (2016)
  - Total: 10,686
- Time zone: UTC+3:30 (IRST)

Pain Rokh Rural District (Persian: دهستان پائين رخ) is in Jolgeh Rokh District of Torbat-e Heydarieh County, Razavi Khorasan province, Iran. Its capital is the village of Sar Bala. The previous capital of the rural district was the village of Nasar, now a city.

== Demographics ==
=== Population ===
At the time of the 2006 National Census, the rural district's population was 10,156 in 2,458 households. There were 9,257 inhabitants in 2,590 households at the following census of 2011. The 2016 census measured the population of the rural district as 10,686 in 3,141 households. The most populous of its 33 villages was Nasar (now a city), with 3,633 people.

=== Other villages in the rural district ===
- Ahmadabad-e Khazai
- Asadabad
- Asadiyeh
- Mahmudabad
- Qesh Robat
- Robat-e Mian Dasht
