= Moqam Rural District =

Rural district in Hormozgan province, Iran

Moqam Rural District Persian: دهستان مقام
- Rural District
- Location within Iran
- Coordinates: 26°51′23″N 53°40′02″E
- Country: Iran
- Province: Hormozgan
- County: Bandar Lengeh
- District: Shibkaveh
- Capital: Bandar-e Moqam

Population (2016)
  - Total: 8,814
- Time zone: UTC+3:30 (IRST)

Moqam Rural District (Persian: دهستان مقام) is in Shibkaveh District of Bandar Lengeh County, Hormozgan province, Iran. Its capital is the village of Bandar-e Moqam.

== Demographics ==
=== Population ===
At the time of the 2006 National Census, the rural district's population was 6,227 in 1,113 households. There were 7,640 inhabitants in 1,679 households at the following census of 2011. The 2016 census measured the population of the rural district as 8,814 in 2,198 households. The most populous of its 24 villages was Bandar-e Moqam, with 1,955 people.
