= Moghuyeh Rural District =

Rural district in Hormozgan province, Iran

Moghuyeh Rural District Persian: دهستان مغویه
- Rural District
- Location within Iran
- Coordinates: 26°42′53″N 54°35′57″E
- Country: Iran
- Province: Hormozgan
- County: Bandar Lengeh
- District: Central
- Capital: Moghuyeh

Population (2016)
  - Total: 16,803
- Time zone: UTC+3:30 (IRST)

Moghuyeh Rural District (Persian: دهستان مغویه) is in the Central District of Bandar Lengeh County, Hormozgan province, Iran. Its capital is the village of Moghuyeh.

== Demographics ==
=== Population ===
At the time of the 2006 National Census, the rural district's population was 13,028 in 2,292 households. There were 15,636 inhabitants in 3,430 households at the following census of 2011. The 2016 census measured the population of the rural district as 16,803 in 3,997 households. The most populous of its 22 villages was Bandar-e Shenas, with 2,998 people.
