= Bandar Charak Rural District =

Rural district in Hormozgan province, Iran

Bandar Charak Rural District Persian: دهستان بندر چارك
- Rural District
- Location within Iran
- Coordinates: 26°50′17″N 54°06′57″E
- Country: Iran
- Province: Hormozgan
- County: Bandar Lengeh
- District: Shibkaveh
- Capital: Bandar Charak

Population (2016)
  - Total: 5,765
- Time zone: UTC+3:30 (IRST)

Bandar Charak Rural District (Persian: دهستان بندر چارك) is in Shibkaveh District of Bandar Lengeh County, Hormozgan province, Iran. It is administered from the city of Bandar Charak.

== Demographics ==
=== Population ===
At the time of the 2006 National Census, the rural district's population was 4,435 in 798 households. There were 5,118 inhabitants in 1,215 households at the following census of 2011. The 2016 census measured the population of the rural district as 5,765 in 1,494 households. The most populous of its 21 villages was Gerzeh, with 1,170 people.
