= Howmeh Rural District (Bandar Lengeh County) =

Rural district in Hormozgan province, Iran

Howmeh Rural District Persian: دهستان حومه
- Rural District
- Location within Iran
- Coordinates: 26°41′48″N 54°55′37″E
- Country: Iran
- Province: Hormozgan
- County: Bandar Lengeh
- District: Central
- Capital: Gezir

Population (2016)
  - Total: 12,674
- Time zone: UTC+3:30 (IRST)

Howmeh Rural District (Persian: دهستان حومه) is in the Central District of Bandar Lengeh County, Hormozgan province, Iran. Its capital is the village of Gezir.

== Demographics ==
=== Population ===
At the time of the 2006 National Census, the rural district's population was 9,624 in 1,888 households. There were 10,973 inhabitants in 2,553 households at the following census of 2011. The 2016 census measured the population of the rural district as 12,674 in 3,168 households. The most populous of its 24 villages was Gezir, with 4,693 people.
