= Mehran Rural District =

Rural district in Hormozgan province, Iran

Mehran Rural District Persian: دهستان مهران
- Rural District
- Location within Iran
- Coordinates: 26°58′19″N 54°54′46″E
- Country: Iran
- Province: Hormozgan
- County: Bandar Lengeh
- District: Mehran
- Capital: Podol

Population (2016)
  - Total: 7,272
- Time zone: UTC+3:30 (IRST)

Mehran Rural District (Persian: دهستان مهران) is in Mehran District of Bandar Lengeh County, Hormozgan province, Iran. Its capital is the village of Podol.

== Demographics ==
=== Population ===
At the time of the 2006 National Census, the rural district's population (as a part of the Central District) was 8,071 in 1,564 households. There were 9,358 inhabitants in 2,200 households at the following census of 2011, by which time the rural district had been separated from the district in the formation of Mehran District. The 2016 census measured the population of the rural district as 7,272 in 1,888 households. The most populous of its 27 villages was Podol, with 1,276 people.
