= Dezhgan Rural District =

Rural district in Hormozgan province, Iran

Dezhgan Rural District Persian: دهستان دژگان
- Rural District
- Location within Iran
- Coordinates: 26°55′15″N 55°21′46″E
- Country: Iran
- Province: Hormozgan
- County: Bandar Lengeh
- District: Mehran
- Capital: Dezhgan

Population (2016)
  - Total: 10,304
- Time zone: UTC+3:30 (IRST)

Dezhgan Rural District (Persian: دهستان دژگان) is in Mehran District of Bandar Lengeh County, Hormozgan province, Iran. Its capital is the village of Dezhgan.

== Demographics ==
=== Population ===
At the time of the 2006 National Census, the rural district's population (as a part of the Central District) was 7,461 in 1,607 households. There were 9,304 inhabitants in 2,279 households at the following census of 2011, by which time the rural district had been separated from the district in the formation of Mehran District. The 2016 census measured the population of the rural district as 10,304 in 2,843 households. The most populous of its 29 villages was Kanakh, with 2,240 people.
