= Shibkaveh District (Bandar Lengeh County) =

District in Hormozgan province, Iran

Shibkaveh District Persian: بخش شیبکوه
- District
- Location within Iran
- Coordinates: 26°51′28″N 53°54′43″E
- Country: Iran
- Province: Hormozgan
- County: Bandar Lengeh
- Capital: Bandar Charak

Population (2016)
  - Total: 18,645
- Time zone: UTC+3:30 (IRST)

Shibkaveh District (Persian: بخش شیبکوه) is in Bandar Lengeh County, Hormozgan province, Iran. Its capital is the city of Bandar Charak.

== Demographics ==
=== Population ===
At the time of the 2006 National Census, the district's population was 13,620 in 2,520 households. The following census in 2011 counted 16,516 people in 3,605 households. The 2016 census measured the population of the district as 18,645 inhabitants in 4,741 households.

=== Administrative divisions ===
Shibkaveh District Population
Administrative Divisions	2006	2011	2016
Bandar Charak RD	4,435	5,118	5,765
Moqam RD	6,227	7,640	8,814
Bandar Charak (city)	2,958	3,758	4,066
Total	13,620	16,516	18,645
RD = Rural District
