= Jolgeh Rokh District =

District in Razavi Khorasan province, Iran

Jolgeh Rokh District Persian: بخش جلگه رخ
- District
- Location within Iran
- Coordinates: 35°39′N 59°18′E
- Country: Iran
- Province: Razavi Khorasan
- County: Torbat-e Heydarieh
- Established: 1996
- Capital: Robat-e Sang

Population (2016)
  - Total: 25,748
- Time zone: UTC+3:30 (IRST)

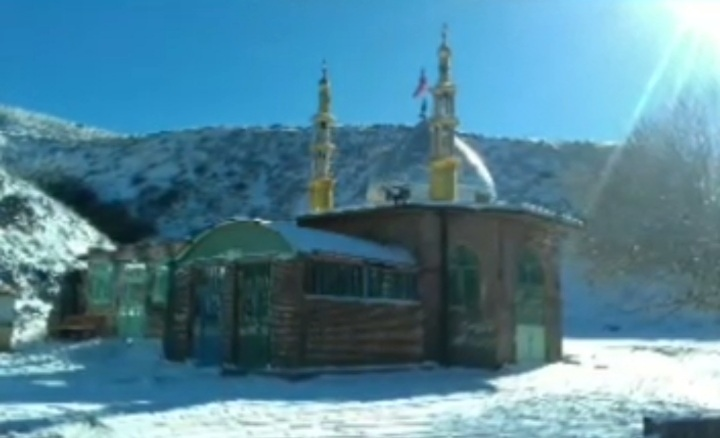

Jolgeh Rokh District (Persian: بخش جلگه رخ) is in Torbat-e Heydarieh County, Razavi Khorasan province, Iran. Its capital is the city of Robat-e Sang.

== History ==
The village of Nasar was converted to a city in 2021.

== Demographics ==
=== Population ===
At the time of the 2006 census, the district's population was 24,886 in 6,162 households. The following census in 2011 counted 24,705 people in 6,943 households. The 2016 census measured the population of the district as 25,748 inhabitants in 7,822 households.

=== Administrative divisions ===
Jolgeh Rokh District Population
Administrative Divisions	2006	2011	2016
Bala Rokh RD	7,483	7,565	7,825
Miyan Rokh RD	5,903	6,162	5,686
Pain Rokh RD	10,156	9,257	10,686
Nasar (city) (Note: Became a city after the 2016 census)			
Robat-e Sang (city)	1,344	1,721	1,551
Total	24,886	24,705	25,748
RD = Rural District
