= Central District (Bandar Lengeh County) =

District in Hormozgan province, Iran

Central District (Bandar Lengeh County) Persian: بخش مرکزی شهرستان بندر لنگه
- District
- Location within Iran
- Coordinates: 26°42′55″N 54°47′51″E
- Country: Iran
- Province: Hormozgan
- County: Bandar Lengeh
- Capital: Bandar Lengeh

Population (2016)
  - Total: 79,125
- Time zone: UTC+3:30 (IRST)

The Central District of Bandar Lengeh County (Persian: بخش مرکزی شهرستان بندر لنگه) is in Hormozgan province, Iran. Its capital is the city of Bandar Lengeh.

== History ==
After the 2006 National Census, Dezhgan and Mehran Rural Districts were separated from the district in the formation of Mehran District.

== Demographics ==
=== Population ===
At the time of the 2006 census, the district's population was 78,368 in 15,848 households. The following census in 2011 counted 73,583 people in 16,727 households. The 2016 census measured the population of the district as 79,125 inhabitants in 20,538 households.

=== Administrative divisions ===
Central District (Bandar Lengeh County) Population
Administrative Divisions	2006	2011	2016
Dezhgan RD (Note: Transferred to Mehran District)	7,461		
Howmeh RD	9,624	10,973	12,674
Mehran RD	8,071		
Moghuyeh RD	13,028	15,636	16,803
Bandar Lengeh (city)	25,303	30,478	30,435
Kong (city)	14,881	16,496	19,213
Total	78,368	73,583	79,125
RD = Rural District
