= Bandar Lengeh County =

County in Hormozgan province, Iran

Bandar Lengeh County Persian: شهرستان بندر لنگه
- County
- Location of Bandar Lengeh County (left, green) in Hormozgan province

- Location of Hormozgan province in Iran
- Coordinates: 26°32′N 54°31′E
- Country: Iran
- Province: Hormozgan
- Capital: Bandar Lengeh
- Districts: Central, Kish, Mehran, Shibkaveh

Area
  - Total: 7,617 km^{2} (2,941 sq mi)

Population (2016)
  - Total: 159,358
  - Density: 20.92/km^{2} (54.19/sq mi)
- Time zone: UTC+3:30 (IRST)

Bandar Lengeh County (Persian: شهرستان بندر لنگه) is in Hormozgan province, Iran. Its capital is the city of Bandar Lengeh.

== History ==
After the 2006 National Census, Dezhgan and Mehran Rural Districts were separated from the Central District in the formation of Mehran District. After the 2011 census, the village of Lamazan was elevated to the status of a city.

On March 25, 2025, security forces arrested 16-year old Yousef Rasaneh, a resident of the village of Firuzabad in Rask County, Sistan and Baluchestan province, while he was in the county and took him to an undisclosed location.

== Demographics ==
=== Population ===
At the time of the 2006 census, the county's population was 113,625 in 24,712 households. The following census in 2011 counted 134,713 people in 32,981 households. The 2016 census measured the population of the county as 159,358 in 44,398 households.

=== Administrative divisions ===
Bandar Lengeh County's population history and administrative structure over three consecutive censuses are shown in the following table.

Bandar Lengeh County Population
Administrative Divisions	2006	2011	2016
Central District	78,368	73,583	79,125
Dezhgan RD	7,461		
Howmeh RD	9,624	10,973	12,674
Mehran RD	8,071		
Moghuyeh RD	13,028	15,636	16,803
Bandar Lengeh (city)	25,303	30,478	30,435
Kong (city)	14,881	16,496	19,213
Kish District	21,637	25,952	41,258
Kish RD	79	86	191
Lavan RD	891	1,047	1,214
Kish (city)	20,667	24,819	39,853
Mehran District		18,662	20,321
Dezhgan RD		9,304	10,304
Mehran RD		9,358	7,272
Lamazan (city)			2,745
Shibkaveh District	13,620	16,516	18,645
Bandar Charak RD	4,435	5,118	5,765
Moqam RD	6,227	7,640	8,814
Bandar Charak (city)	2,958	3,758	4,066
Total	113,625	134,713	159,358
RD = Rural District

== See also ==
Media related to Bandar Lengeh County at Wikimedia Commons
