= Razg =

Razg or Razk or Razq or Rezg or Razag or Rezq (Persian: رزگ) may refer to various places in Iran:

- Razag, Fars
- Razg, Gonabad, Razavi Khorasan Province
- Razg, Torbat-e Heydarieh, Razavi Khorasan Province
- Razg, Birjand, South Khorasan Province
- Razg, Khusf, South Khorasan Province
- Rezg, Nehbandan, South Khorasan Province
- Razq, Sarbisheh, South Khorasan Province
