= Deh Pain =

Deh Pain or Deh-e Pain (Persian: ده پايين) may refer to:

- Deh-e Pain, Estahban, Fars Province
- Deh-e Pain, Lamerd, Fars Province
- Deh-e Pain, Shahr-e Babak, Kerman Province
- Deh-e Pain, Kohgiluyeh and Boyer-Ahmad
- Deh Pain, Razavi Khorasan
- Deh-e Pain, Razavi Khorasan
- Deh Pain Rural District, in Ilam Province
