= Razak =

Razak may refer to:

== People ==
=== Given name ===
- Razak Boukari (born 1987), Ghanaian footballer
- Abdul Razak Hussein (1922–1976), Malaysian politician; second Prime Minister of Malaysia
- Razak Nuhu (born 1991), Ghanaian footballer
- Razak Omotoyossi (1985–2025), Beninese footballer
- Razak Pimpong (born 1982), Ghanaian footballer
- Razak Salifu (born 1988), Ghanaian footballer

=== Surname or patronymic ===
- Abdul Razak (canoeist) (born 1964), Indonesian canoer
- Abdul Razak (footballer) (born 1992), English footballer
- Abdul Razak (Guantanamo detainee 1043), Afghan politician
- Azizan Abdul Razak (1944–2013), Malaysian politician
- Brimah Razak (born 1987), Ghanaian footballer
- Hamdi Razak (born 1985), French footballer
- Ibrahim Abdul Razak (born 1983), Ghanaian footballer
- Ismail Abdul Razak (born 1989), Ghanaian footballer
- Karim Abdul Razak (born 1956), Ghanaian footballer
- Mohammed Razak (born 1986), Qatari footballer
- Najib Razak (born 1953), Malaysian politician
- Nazir Razak (born 1966), Malaysian banking executive
- U Razak (1898–1947), Burmese politician and educationalist

== Places ==
- Razak, Fars, a village in Iran
- Razak, Mazandaran, a village in Iran
- Razak, Qazvin, a village in Iran
- Razak, Razavi Khorasan, a village in Iran
- Razak, South Khorasan, a village in Iran

== Other uses ==
- Razak Report, Malayan educational proposal written in 1956

== See also ==
- Razaq (disambiguation)
- Razzak (disambiguation)
- Razzaq (disambiguation)
