= Kaj Derakht =

Kaj Derakht (Persian: كج درخت) may refer to the following places in Iran:

- Kaj Derakht, Fariman
- Kaj Derakht, Mashhad
- Kaj Derakht, Torbat-e Heydarieh

== See also ==
- Kaj (disambiguation)
