= 1923 Torbat-e Heydarieh earthquake =

Earthquake in Iran

- Location within Iran
- UTC time: 1923-05-25 22:21:36
- ISC event: 911377
- USGS-ANSS: ComCat
- Magnitude: 6.0 M_{w}
- Depth: 15 km (9.3 mi)
- Epicenter: 35.21°N 59.12°E (macroseismic)
- Areas affected: Iran
- Max. intensity: MMI VIII (Severe)
- Casualties: 2,200 fatalities

The 1923 Torbat-e Heydarieh earthquake occurred in Razavi Khorasan province, Iran on 25 May. The M_{w} 6.0 earthquake, which had a maximum Modified Mercalli intensity of VIII (Severe), completely levelled the village of Quzan. The earthquake killed an estimated 2,200 people.

== Earthquake ==
The earthquake had a macroseismic epicenter near Kaj Darakht, about 10 km (6.2 mi) west of Torbat-e Heydarieh, and south of the Doruneh Fault zone. The earthquake's epicenter location varies significantly across catalogs with . According to some observatory readings from Europe, its surface-wave magnitude was calculated to be 5.8. Some earthquake catalogs that used instrumental records of the event assigned epicenters with large error margins up to 524 km (326 mi) away from the macroseismic epicenter in the regions of Herat, Balochistan and the Dasht-e Lut.

Its location is within a seismically active zone that stretches from Nishapur to Sisan-e Qadim along a junction between the Lut Block and the flysch belt. This strip of area intersects the 600 km (370 mi) east-west striking Doruneh Fault zone that stretches from Khwaf to the Dasht-e Kavir. The region is seismically active as low-magnitude earthquakes occur frequently however larger events such as those in 1336 and 1619 are rare.

The Doruneh Fault zone is one of the longest and most geologically prominent faults in Iran. It is a sinistral strike-slip fault with an annual slip rate of 2.5 mm (0.098 in). No large earthquakes has been associated with the fault in historical times although the 1923 event, moderate in magnitude, may have been caused by movement on this fault. Large earthquakes are thought to occur along the fault every 2,000 years.

Based on its macroseismic effects, the meizoseismal area was probably no larger than 60 km^{2} (23 sq mi) and had a radius no further than 5 km (3.1 mi). The Modified Mercalli intensity in the area was evaluated at VIII (Severe) based on reports of people and animals being tossed to the floor. There were no surface ruptures observed along the Doruneh Fault zone though limited land slumping occurred near channels and qanats which were not tectonic in origin. Modified Mercalli intensities no greater than VI (Strong) followed along a predominantly easternly trend from the epicenter and covered a 1,000 km^{2} (390 sq mi) area.

== Damage ==
Despite the relatively small magnitude, its epicenter in a densely populated region with many small and scattered villages made it destructive. The area with the greatest damage and assigned VIII (Severe) encompassed the settlements of Kaj Darakht, Quzan, Khurgh Mortazavieh; abandoned sites such as Chah-i Jauzaq, Qalandarabad, Aliabad, Taqiabad, Hasanabad, Hassanshab; and several farms.

A doctor from the American Mission in Mashad said these reports were inflated, claiming the death toll did not exceed 1,000. About five villages were totally razed, 20 partially affected and only 30 deaths in Torbat-e Heydarieh. About 770 people died within this area while 90 people died in the surrounding region. Officials counted a total of 2,219 dead and 170 injured. Ambraseys and Moinfar only recorded about 900 fatalities.

In Quzan, which was razed, lost residents and many of its livestock. The town was reconstructed over several years as the village's qanats continued supplying sufficient water despite its reduced capacity after the earthquake. In Kaj Darakht, 60 people died and the town was almost levelled. Several people died in Chah-i Jauzaq, a remote farm to the west–northwest. In Khurg, 1 km (0.62 mi) east of Quzan, about half of the 220 residents died. To the south, in Taqiabad, a village of 120 people, half the population was killed. In Mortazavieh, the village's mujtahid was among the 180 that died.

Two hundred and thirty homes were damaged in city of Torbat-e Heydarieh which housed 10,000 inhabitants. Reports of damage in the city were highly exaggerated to sensationalise the event and raise greater concern. About 25 or fewer homes of the adobe kind and badly constructed, were destroyed, and only seven or eight people died in the city. In Buriabad, 15 people died and 50 of its 120 dwellings were damaged. Water flow in the village qanats may have increased following the shock. Damage covered a wide area which stretched 20 km (12 mi) east of Torbat-e Heydarieh but was considered minor; few homes collapsed, killing some people in Guji and Malekabad. Damage also occurred in other villages with limited or no fatalities. In Shadmehr, few homes were ruined while 50 others were near total-losses; about 15 people died.

== Aftermath ==
Separate boards were formed to handle the injured, sustinance for survivors and burial; crop cultivation and irrigation; and claims for dead people's will and property losses. The Governor-General of Mashad requested the Tehran treasury to provide 100,000 tumans for reconstruction efforts. A public assembly of the Majlis to discuss the grant petition opened on 9 June 1923 with Ahmad Shah Qajar being involved. Many villagers believed the grant would be used only for the interest of Torbat-e Heydarieh and their levelled settlements would not be restored.

== See also ==
- List of earthquakes in 1923
- List of earthquakes in Iran
