= Khvorshaneh =

Khvorshaneh خورشانه
- Village
- Location within Iran
- Coordinates: 35°15′14″N 59°15′20″E
- Country: Iran
- Province: Razavi Khorasan
- County: Torbat-e Heydarieh
- Bakhsh: Central
- Rural District: Pain Velayat

Population (2006)
  - Total: 24
- Time zone: UTC+3:30 (IRST)
  - Summer (DST): UTC+4:30 (IRDT)

Khvorshaneh (Persian: خورشانه, also Romanized as Khvorshāneh) is a village in Pain Velayat Rural District, in the Central District of Torbat-e Heydarieh County, Razavi Khorasan Province, Iran. At the 2006 census, its population was 24, in 7 families.
