= Kameh Sofla =

Kameh Sofla كامه سفلي
- Village
- Location within Iran
- Coordinates: 35°27′16″N 59°14′10″E
- Country: Iran
- Province: Razavi Khorasan
- County: Torbat-e Heydarieh
- Bakhsh: Central
- Rural District: Bala Velayat

Population (2006)
  - Total: 352
- Time zone: UTC+3:30 (IRST)
  - Summer (DST): UTC+4:30 (IRDT)

Kameh Sofla (Persian: كامه سفلي, also Romanized as Kāmeh Soflá; also known as Kāmeh-ye Pā’īn, Kāmeh, and Kāmeh Pā’īn) is a village in Bala Velayat Rural District, in the Central District of Torbat-e Heydarieh County, Razavi Khorasan Province, Iran. At the 2006 census, its population was 352, in 107 families.
