= Khurq =

Khurq خورق
- Village
- Location within Iran
- Coordinates: 35°12′32″N 59°09′53″E
- Country: Iran
- Province: Razavi Khorasan
- County: Torbat-e Heydarieh
- Bakhsh: Central
- Rural District: Pain Velayat

Population (2006)
  - Total: 145
- Time zone: UTC+3:30 (IRST)
  - Summer (DST): UTC+4:30 (IRDT)

Khurq (Persian: خورق, also Romanized as Khūrq) is a village in Pain Velayat Rural District, in the Central District of Torbat-e Heydarieh County, Razavi Khorasan Province, Iran. At the 2006 census, its population was 145, in 52 families.
