= Dugheshk =

Village in Razavi Khorasan Province, Iran

Dugheshk دوغشك
- Village
- Location within Iran
- Coordinates: 35°19′06″N 59°14′39″E
- Country: Iran
- Province: Razavi Khorasan
- County: Torbat-e Heydarieh
- Bakhsh: Central
- Rural District: Bala Velayat

Population (2006)
  - Total: 633
- Time zone: UTC+3:30 (IRST)
  - Summer (DST): UTC+4:30 (IRDT)

Dugheshk (Persian: دوغشك, also Romanized as Dūgheshk; also known as Dūghesnak) is a village in Bala Velayat Rural District, in the Central District of Torbat-e Heydarieh County, Razavi Khorasan Province, Iran. At the 2006 census, its population was 633, in 183 families.
