= Bagh Meyan =

Bagh Meyan باغ ميون
- Village
- Location within Iran
- Coordinates: 35°14′30″N 59°16′29″E
- Country: Iran
- Province: Razavi Khorasan
- County: Torbat-e Heydarieh
- Bakhsh: Central
- Rural District: Pain Velayat

Population (2006)
  - Total: 322
- Time zone: UTC+3:30 (IRST)
  - Summer (DST): UTC+4:30 (IRDT)

Bagh Meyan (Persian: باغ ميون, also Romanized as Bāgh Meyān and Bāgh Mīān) is a village in Pain Velayat Rural District, in the Central District of Torbat-e Heydarieh County, Razavi Khorasan Province, Iran. At the 2006 census, its population was 322, in 72 families.

== See also ==
- List of cities, towns and villages in Razavi Khorasan Province
