= Kameh Olya =

Kameh Olya كامه عليا
- Village
- Location within Iran
- Coordinates: 35°29′08″N 59°10′12″E
- Country: Iran
- Province: Razavi Khorasan
- County: Torbat-e Heydarieh
- Bakhsh: Central
- Rural District: Bala Velayat

Population (2006)
  - Total: 507
- Time zone: UTC+3:30 (IRST)
  - Summer (DST): UTC+4:30 (IRDT)

Kameh Olya (Persian: كامه عليا, also Romanized as Kāmeh ‘Olyā; also known as Kāmeh-ye Bālā) is a village in Bala Velayat Rural District, in the Central District of Torbat-e Heydarieh County, Razavi Khorasan Province, Iran. At the 2006 census, its population was 507, in 143 families.
