= Senjedpur =

Senjedpur سنجدپور
- Village
- Location within Iran
- Coordinates: 35°25′05″N 59°09′04″E
- Country: Iran
- Province: Razavi Khorasan
- County: Torbat-e Heydarieh
- Bakhsh: Central
- Rural District: Bala Velayat

Population (2006)
  - Total: 139
- Time zone: UTC+3:30 (IRST)
  - Summer (DST): UTC+4:30 (IRDT)

Senjedpur (Persian: سنجدپور, also Romanized as Senjedpūr; also known as Senjed Būr) is a village in Bala Velayat Rural District, in the Central District of Torbat-e Heydarieh County, Razavi Khorasan Province, Iran. At the 2006 census, its population was 139, in 38 families.
