= Kalateh-ye Ali Siah =

Kalateh-ye Ali Siah كلاته علي سياه
- village
- Location within Iran
- Coordinates: 35°15′57″N 59°16′47″E
- Country: Iran
- Province: Razavi Khorasan
- County: Torbat-e Heydarieh
- Bakhsh: Central
- Rural District: Pain Velayat

Population (2006)
  - Total: 268
- Time zone: UTC+3:30 (IRST)
  - Summer (DST): UTC+4:30 (IRDT)

Kalateh-ye Ali Siah (Persian: كلاته علي سياه, also Romanized as Kalāteh-ye ‘Alī Sīāh) is a village in Pain Velayat Rural District, in the Central District of Torbat-e Heydarieh County, Razavi Khorasan Province, Iran. At the 2006 census, its population was 268, in 71 families.
