= Manzar =

Manzar may refer to:

- a festival in Mumbai, India; see Institute of Chemical Technology
- Manzar, Bushehr, a village in Bushehr Province, Iran
- Manzar, Nishapur, a village in Razavi Khorasan Province, Iran
- Manzar, Torbat-e Heydarieh, a village in Razavi Khorasan Province, Iran
