= Serisha =

Serisha سريشا
- Village
- Location within Iran
- Coordinates: 35°26′31″N 59°17′37″E
- Country: Iran
- Province: Razavi Khorasan
- County: Torbat-e Heydarieh
- Bakhsh: Central
- Rural District: Bala Velayat

Population (2006)
  - Total: 70
- Time zone: UTC+3:30 (IRST)
  - Summer (DST): UTC+4:30 (IRDT)

Serisha (Persian: سريشا, also Romanized as Serīshā, Serīsha, and Serīshāh) is a village in Bala Velayat Rural District, in the Central District of Torbat-e Heydarieh County, Razavi Khorasan Province, Iran. At the 2006 census, its population was 70, in 17 families.
