= Khodabandeh, Razavi Khorasan =

Khodabandeh خدابنده
- Village
- Location within Iran
- Coordinates: 35°14′50″N 59°16′01″E
- Country: Iran
- Province: Razavi Khorasan
- County: Torbat-e Heydarieh
- Bakhsh: Central
- Rural District: Pain Velayat

Population (2006)
  - Total: 194
- Time zone: UTC+3:30 (IRST)
  - Summer (DST): UTC+4:30 (IRDT)

Khodabandeh (Persian: خدابنده, also Romanized as Khodābandeh) is a village in Pain Velayat Rural District, in the Central District of Torbat-e Heydarieh County, Razavi Khorasan Province, Iran. At the 2006 census, its population was 194, in 46 families.

== See also ==
- List of cities, towns and villages in Razavi Khorasan Province
