= Sheykh Abu ol Qasem =

Sheykh Abu ol Qasem شيخ ابوالقاسم
- Village
- Location within Iran
- Coordinates: 35°14′01″N 59°11′54″E
- Country: Iran
- Province: Razavi Khorasan
- County: Torbat-e Heydarieh
- Bakhsh: Central
- Rural District: Pain Velayat

Population (2006)
  - Total: 223
- Time zone: UTC+3:30 (IRST)
  - Summer (DST): UTC+4:30 (IRDT)

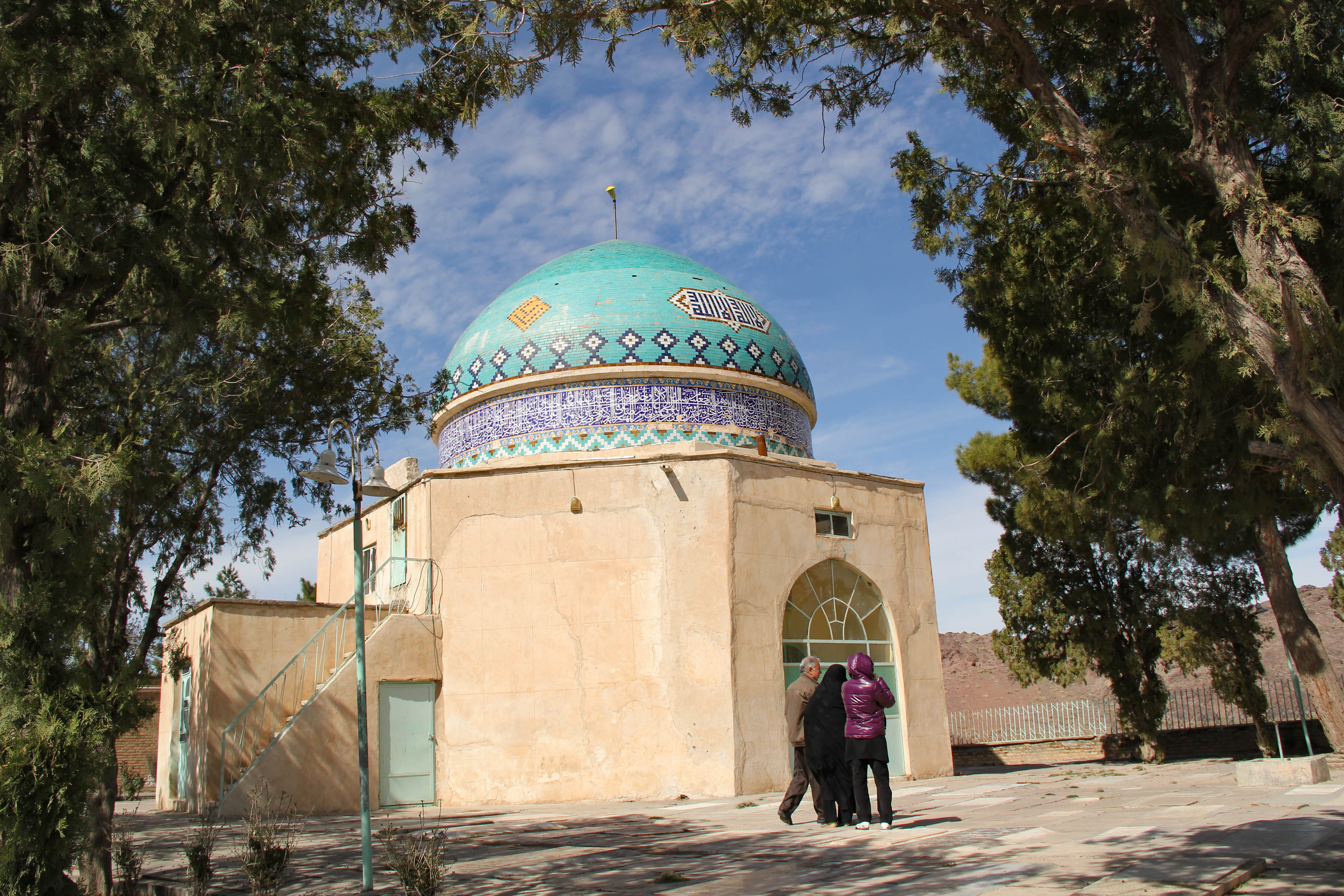

Sheykh Abu ol Qasem (Persian: شيخ ابوالقاسم, also Romanized as Sheykh Abū ol Qāsem; also known as Kalāteh-ye Darvīsh and Sheykh Abolqāsem) is a village in Pain Velayat Rural District, in the Central District of Torbat-e Heydarieh County, Razavi Khorasan Province, Iran. At the 2006 census, its population was 223, in 54 families.
