= Sorkhabad, Razavi Khorasan =

Village in Razavi Khorasan province, Iran

Sorkhabad Persian: سرخ اباد
- Village
- Location within Iran
- Coordinates: 35°18′50″N 59°03′01″E
- Country: Iran
- Province: Razavi Khorasan
- County: Torbat-e Heydarieh
- District: Bayg
- Rural District: Bayg

Population (2016)
  - Total: 266
- Time zone: UTC+3:30 (IRST)

Sorkhabad (Persian: سرخ اباد) (Note: Also romanized as Sorkhābād) is a village in Bayg Rural District of Bayg District in Torbat-e Heydarieh County, Razavi Khorasan province, Iran.

== Demographics ==
=== Population ===
At the time of the 2006 National Census, the village's population was 435 in 146 households. The following census in 2011 counted 298 people in 132 households. The 2016 census measured the population of the village as 266 people in 114 households.
