= Howz-e Sorkh, Torbat-e Heydarieh =

Village in Razavi Khorasan province, Iran

Howz-e Sorkh Persian: حوض سرخ
- Village
- Location within Iran
- Coordinates: 35°11′39″N 59°08′12″E
- Country: Iran
- Province: Razavi Khorasan
- County: Torbat-e Heydarieh
- District: Central
- Rural District: Pain Velayat

Population (2016)
  - Total: 526
- Time zone: UTC+3:30 (IRST)

Howz-e Sorkh (Persian: حوض سرخ) (Note: Also romanized as Ḩowẕ-e Sorkh; also known as Mortazāneh, Mortazavī, Mortazavīyeh Ḩowz-e Sorkh, and Murtazāneh) is a village in Pain Velayat Rural District of the Central District in Torbat-e Heydarieh County, Razavi Khorasan province, Iran.

== Demographics ==
=== Population ===
At the time of the 2006 National Census, the village's population was 581 in 154 households. The following census in 2011 counted 445 people in 146 households. The 2016 census recorded a population of the village as 526 people in 169 households.
