= Sangalabad =

Village in Razavi Khorasan province, Iran

Sangalabad Persian: سنگل اباد
- Village
- Location within Iran
- Coordinates: 35°06′39″N 59°10′39″E
- Country: Iran
- Province: Razavi Khorasan
- County: Torbat-e Heydarieh
- District: Central
- Rural District: Pain Velayat

Population (2016)
  - Total: 745
- Time zone: UTC+3:30 (IRST)

Sangalabad (Persian: سنگل اباد) (Note: Also romanized as Sangalābād; also known as Sanjarābād) is a village in Pain Velayat Rural District of the Central District in Torbat-e Heydarieh County, Razavi Khorasan province, Iran.

== Demographics ==
=== Population ===
At the time of the 2006 National Census, the village's population was 742 in 193 households. The following census in 2011 counted 744 people in 226 households. The 2016 census recorded a population of the village as 745 people in 226 households.
