= Malekabad, Torbat-e Heydarieh =

Malekabad ملك اباد
- Village
- Location within Iran
- Coordinates: 35°17′27″N 59°16′27″E
- Country: Iran
- Province: Razavi Khorasan
- County: Torbat-e Heydarieh
- Bakhsh: Central
- Rural District: Bala Velayat

Population (2006)
  - Total: 189
- Time zone: UTC+3:30 (IRST)
  - Summer (DST): UTC+4:30 (IRDT)

Malekabad (Persian: ملك اباد, also Romanized as Malekābād) is a village in Bala Velayat Rural District, in the Central District of Torbat-e Heydarieh County, Razavi Khorasan Province, Iran. At the 2006 census, its population was 189, in 46 families.
