= Karizak-e Khujui =

Village in Razavi Khorasan province, Iran

Karizak-e Khujui Persian: كاريزك خوجوئي
- Village
- Location within Iran
- Coordinates: 35°18′47″N 59°15′15″E
- Country: Iran
- Province: Razavi Khorasan
- County: Torbat-e Heydarieh
- District: Central
- Rural District: Bala Velayat

Population (2016)
  - Total: 1,051
- Time zone: UTC+3:30 (IRST)

Karizak-e Khujui (Persian: كاريزك خوجوئي) (Note: Also romanized as Kārīzak-e Khūjū’ī) is a village in Bala Velayat Rural District of the Central District in Torbat-e Heydarieh County, Razavi Khorasan province, Iran.

== Demographics ==
=== Population ===
At the time of the 2006 National Census, the village's population was 972 in 263 households. The following census in 2011 counted 964 people in 287 households. The 2016 census measured the population of the village as 1,051 people in 334 households.
