= Ferezq =

Village in Razavi Khorasan province, Iran

Ferezq Persian: فرزق
- Village
- Location within Iran
- Coordinates: 35°18′53″N 59°13′11″E
- Country: Iran
- Province: Razavi Khorasan
- County: Torbat-e Heydarieh
- District: Central
- Rural District: Bala Velayat

Population (2016)
  - Total: 1,675
- Time zone: UTC+3:30 (IRST)

Ferezq (Persian: فرزق) is a village in Bala Velayat Rural District of the Central District in Torbat-e Heydarieh County, Razavi Khorasan province, Iran.

== Demographics ==
=== Population ===
At the time of the 2006 National Census, the village's population was 1,420 in 404 households. The following census in 2011 counted 1,594 people in 504 households. The 2016 census measured the population of the village as 1,675 people in 538 households.
