= Asfiukh =

Village in Razavi Khorasan province, Iran

Asfiukh Persian: اسفيوخ
- Village
- Location within Iran
- Coordinates: 35°19′41″N 59°16′18″E
- Country: Iran
- Province: Razavi Khorasan
- County: Torbat-e Heydarieh
- District: Central
- Rural District: Bala Velayat

Population (2016)
  - Total: 1,221
- Time zone: UTC+3:30 (IRST)

Asfiukh (Persian: اسفيوخ) (Note: Also romanized as Asfīūkh) is a village in Bala Velayat Rural District of the Central District in Torbat-e Heydarieh County, Razavi Khorasan province, Iran.

== Demographics ==
=== Population ===
At the time of the 2006 National Census, the village's population was 1,047 in 269 households. The following census in 2011 counted 1,360 people in 297 households. The 2016 census measured the population of the village as 1,221 people in 367 households.
