= Besk, Torbat-e Heydarieh =

Village in Razavi Khorasan province, Iran

Besk Persian: بسك
- Village
- Location within Iran
- Coordinates: 35°23′29″N 59°01′06″E
- Country: Iran
- Province: Razavi Khorasan
- County: Torbat-e Heydarieh
- District: Bayg
- Rural District: Bayg

Population (2016)
  - Total: 342
- Time zone: UTC+3:30 (IRST)

Besk (Persian: بسك) (Note: Also known as Baiāq, Bāyak, Bāyg, Besg, and Bish Baik) is a village in Bayg Rural District of Bayg District in Torbat-e Heydarieh County, Razavi Khorasan province, Iran.

== Demographics ==
=== Population ===
At the time of the 2006 National Census, the village's population was 430 in 121 households. The following census in 2011 counted 381 people in 116 households. The 2016 census measured the population of the village as 342 people in 116 households.
