= Fadihah =

Village in Razavi Khorasan province, Iran

Fadihah Persian: فديهه
- Village
- Location within Iran
- Coordinates: 35°22′49″N 58°55′20″E
- Country: Iran
- Province: Razavi Khorasan
- County: Torbat-e Heydarieh
- District: Bayg
- Rural District: Bayg

Population (2016)
  - Total: 283
- Time zone: UTC+3:30 (IRST)

Fadihah (Persian: فديهه) (Note: Also romanized as Fadīhah and Fadīheh; also known as Fadiha, Fadīmeh, and Pia) is a village in Bayg Rural District of Bayg District in Torbat-e Heydarieh County, Razavi Khorasan province, Iran.

== Demographics ==
=== Population ===
At the time of the 2006 National Census, the village's population was 380 in 122 households. The following census in 2011 counted 330 people in 115 households. The 2016 census measured the population of the village as 283 people in 99 households.
