= Abrud, Torbat-e Heydarieh =

Village in Razavi Khorasan province, Iran

Abrud Persian: ابرود
- Village
- Location within Iran
- Coordinates: 35°18′10″N 59°18′21″E
- Country: Iran
- Province: Razavi Khorasan
- County: Torbat-e Heydarieh
- District: Central
- Rural District: Bala Velayat

Population (2016)
  - Total: 1,840
- Time zone: UTC+3:30 (IRST)

Abrud (Persian: ابرود) (Note: Also romanized as Ābrūd; also known as Uru) is a village in Bala Velayat Rural District of the Central District in Torbat-e Heydarieh County, Razavi Khorasan province, Iran.

== Demographics ==
=== Population ===
At the time of the 2006 National Census, the village's population was 1,636 in 420 households. The following census in 2011 counted 1,743 people in 497 households. The 2016 census measured the population of the village as 1,840 people in 535 households.
