= Sar Kariz, Razavi Khorasan =

Sar Kariz سركاريز
- Village
- Location within Iran
- Coordinates: 35°19′19″N 59°15′36″E
- Country: Iran
- Province: Razavi Khorasan
- County: Torbat-e Heydarieh
- Bakhsh: Central
- Rural District: Bala Velayat

Population (2006)
  - Total: 538
- Time zone: UTC+3:30 (IRST)
  - Summer (DST): UTC+4:30 (IRDT)

Sar Kariz (Persian: سركاريز, also Romanized as Sar Kārīz) is a village in Bala Velayat Rural District, in the Central District of Torbat-e Heydarieh County, Razavi Khorasan Province, Iran. At the 2006 census, its population was 538, in 161 families.
