= Geshn, Razavi Khorasan =

Village in Razavi Khorasan province, Iran

Geshn Persian: گشن
- Village
- Location within Iran
- Coordinates: 35°19′32″N 59°02′15″E
- Country: Iran
- Province: Razavi Khorasan
- County: Torbat-e Heydarieh
- District: Bayg
- Rural District: Bayg

Population (2016)
  - Total: 76
- Time zone: UTC+3:30 (IRST)

Geshn (Persian: گشن) is a village in Bayg Rural District of Bayg District in Torbat-e Heydarieh County, Razavi Khorasan province, Iran.

== Demographics ==
=== Population ===
At the time of the 2006 National Census, the village's population was 88 in 31 households. The following census in 2011 counted 60 people in 27 households. The 2016 census measured the population of the village as 76 people in 26 households.
