= Zia ol Din-e Olya =

Village in Razavi Khorasan province, Iran

Zia ol Din-e Olya Persian: ضياالدين عليا
- Village
- Location within Iran
- Country: Iran
- Province: Razavi Khorasan
- County: Torbat-e Heydarieh
- District: Central
- Rural District: Bala Velayat

Population (2016)
  - Total: 1,272
- Time zone: UTC+3:30 (IRST)

Zia ol Din-e Olya (Persian: ضياالدين عليا) (Note: Also romanized as Ẕīā’ ol Dīn-e ‘Olyā; also known as Ẕīā’ ed Dīn-e Bālā, Ẕīā’ od Dīn-e Bālā, and Ẕīā od Dīn-e Bālā) is a village in Bala Velayat Rural District of the Central District in Torbat-e Heydarieh County, Razavi Khorasan province, Iran.

== Demographics ==
=== Population ===
At the time of the 2006 National Census, the village's population was 434 in 107 households. The following census in 2011 counted 702 people in 202 households. The 2016 census measured the population of the village as 1,272 people in 376 households.
