= Rud Majan =

Village in Razavi Khorasan province, Iran

Rud Majan Persian: رودمعجن
- Village
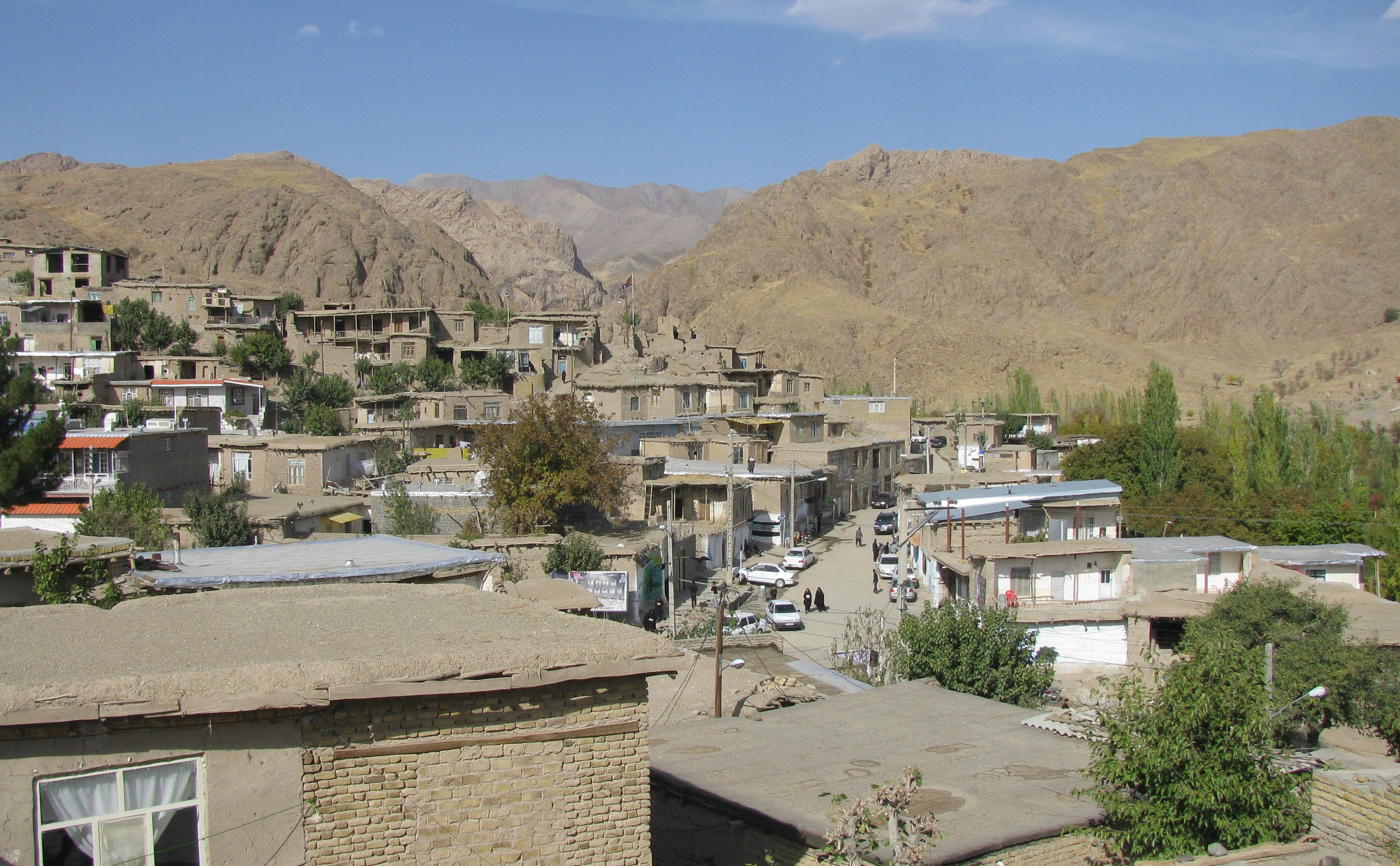

- Location within Iran
- Coordinates: 35°26′25″N 58°49′59″E
- Country: Iran
- Province: Razavi Khorasan
- County: Torbat-e Heydarieh
- District: Bayg
- Rural District: Bayg

Population (2016)
  - Total: 662
- Time zone: UTC+3:30 (IRST)

Rud Majan (Persian: رودمعجن) (Note: Also romanized as Rūd Ma‘jan; also known as Rāzmaghān, Rāzmgahān, and Zarmajān) is a village in Bayg Rural District of Bayg District in Torbat-e Heydarieh County, Razavi Khorasan province, Iran.

== Demographics ==
=== Population ===
At the time of the 2006 National Census, the village's population was 956 in 330 households. The following census in 2011 counted 747 people in 303 households. The 2016 census measured the population of the village as 662 people in 288 households.
