= Umi, Iran =

Village in Razavi Khorasan province, Iran

Umi Persian: اومي
- Village
- Location within Iran
- Coordinates: 35°14′08″N 59°12′49″E
- Country: Iran
- Province: Razavi Khorasan
- County: Torbat-e Heydarieh
- District: Central
- Rural District: Pain Velayat

Population (2016)
  - Total: 658
- Time zone: UTC+3:30 (IRST)

Umi (Persian: اومي) (Note: Also romanized as Īmī and Ūmī) is a village in Pain Velayat Rural District of the Central District in Torbat-e Heydarieh County, Razavi Khorasan province, Iran.

== Demographics ==
=== Population ===
At the time of the 2006 National Census, the village's population was 627 in 167 households. The following census in 2011 counted 616 people in 194 households. The 2016 census recorded a population of the village as 658 people in 217 households.
