= Bekavol, Torbat-e Heydarieh =

Bokavol بكاول
- Village
- Location within Iran
- Coordinates: 35°29′39″N 59°08′59″E
- Country: Iran
- Province: Razavi Khorasan
- County: Torbat-e Heydarieh
- Bakhsh: Central
- Rural District: Bala Velayat

Population (2006)
  - Total: 198
- Time zone: UTC+3:30 (IRST)
  - Summer (DST): UTC+4:30 (IRDT)

Bokavol (Persian: بكاول, also Romanized as Bokāvol) is a village in Bala Velayat Rural District, in the Central District of Torbat-e Heydarieh County, Razavi Khorasan Province, Iran. At the 2006 census, its population was 198, in 58 families.

== See also ==
- List of cities, towns and villages in Razavi Khorasan Province
