= Nughab, Torbat-e Heydarieh =

Village in Razavi Khorasan province, Iran

Nughab Persian: نوغاب
- Village
- Location within Iran
- Coordinates: 35°18′06″N 59°15′03″E
- Country: Iran
- Province: Razavi Khorasan
- County: Torbat-e Heydarieh
- District: Central
- Rural District: Bala Velayat

Population (2016)
  - Total: 1,056
- Time zone: UTC+3:30 (IRST)

Nughab (Persian: نوغاب) (Note: Also romanized as Nūghāb; also known as Noqāb and Nūqāb (نوقاب)) is a village in Bala Velayat Rural District of the Central District in Torbat-e Heydarieh County, Razavi Khorasan province, Iran.

== Demographics ==
=== Population ===
At the time of the 2006 National Census, the village's population was 902 in 222 households. The following census in 2011 counted 973 people in 280 households. The 2016 census measured the population of the village as 1,056 people in 322 households.
