= Seyuki =

Village in Razavi Khorasan province, Iran

Seyuki Persian: سيوكي
- Village
- Location within Iran
- Coordinates: 35°07′08″N 59°15′10″E
- Country: Iran
- Province: Razavi Khorasan
- County: Torbat-e Heydarieh
- District: Central
- Rural District: Pain Velayat

Population (2016)
  - Total: 998
- Time zone: UTC+3:30 (IRST)

Seyuki (Persian: سيوكي) (Note: Also romanized as Seyūkī, Sīūkī, and Sīyūkī) is a village in Pain Velayat Rural District of the Central District in Torbat-e Heydarieh County, Razavi Khorasan province, Iran.

== Demographics ==
=== Population ===
At the time of the 2006 National Census, the village's population was 1,135 in 326 households. The following census in 2011 counted 1,145 people in 343 households. The 2016 census recorded a population of the village as 998 people in 343 households.
