= Federd =

Village in Razavi Khorasan province, Iran

Federd Persian: فدرد
- Village
- Location within Iran
- Coordinates: 35°16′10″N 59°15′36″E
- Country: Iran
- Province: Razavi Khorasan
- County: Torbat-e Heydarieh
- District: Central
- Rural District: Pain Velayat

Population (2016)
  - Total: 1,470
- Time zone: UTC+3:30 (IRST)

Federd (Persian: فدرد) is a village in Pain Velayat Rural District of the Central District in Torbat-e Heydarieh County, Razavi Khorasan province, Iran.

== Demographics ==
=== Population ===
At the time of the 2006 National Census, the village's population was 1,050 in 269 households. The following census in 2011 counted 1,200 people in 371 households. The 2016 census recorded a population of the village as 1,470 people in 444 households, the most populous in its rural district.
