= Hesar, Torbat-e Heydarieh =

Village in Razavi Khorasan province, Iran

Hesar Persian: حصار
- Village
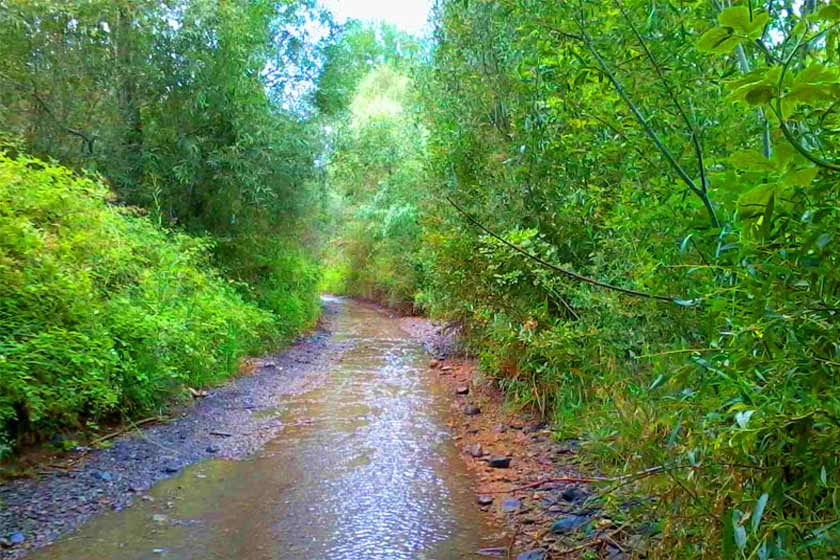
- Landscape near the village of Hesar

- Location within Iran
- Coordinates: 35°25′17″N 58°48′11″E
- Country: Iran
- Province: Razavi Khorasan
- County: Torbat-e Heydarieh
- District: Bayg
- Rural District: Bayg

Population (2016)
  - Total: 1,178
- Time zone: UTC+3:30 (IRST)

Hesar (Persian: حصار) (Note: Also romanized as Ḩeşār) is a village in Bayg Rural District of Bayg District in Torbat-e Heydarieh County, Razavi Khorasan province, Iran.

== Demographics ==
=== Population ===
At the time of the 2006 National Census, the village's population was 1,265 in 399 households. The following census in 2011 counted 1,119 people in 426 households. The 2016 census measured the population of the village as 1,178 people in 426 households, the most populous in its rural district.
