= Bakavol =

Bakavol or Bekavol (Persian: بكاول) may refer to:

- Bakavol, Nishapur
- Bekavol, Torbat-e Heydarieh
