= Shotor Khosb =

Village in Razavi Khorasan province, Iran

Shotor Khosb Persian: شترخسب
- Village
- Location within Iran
- Coordinates: 35°16′02″N 59°17′21″E
- Country: Iran
- Province: Razavi Khorasan
- County: Torbat-e Heydarieh
- District: Central
- Rural District: Pain Velayat

Population (2016)
  - Total: 524
- Time zone: UTC+3:30 (IRST)

Shotor Khosb (Persian: شترخسب) is a village in Pain Velayat Rural District of the Central District in Torbat-e Heydarieh County, Razavi Khorasan province, Iran.

== Demographics ==
=== Population ===
At the time of the 2006 National Census, the village's population was 437 in 114 households. The following census in 2011 counted 510 people in 147 households. The 2016 census recorded a population of the village as 524 people in 162 households.
