= Raziq =

Raziq or Razik may refer to:

== People with the given name ==
- Raziq Faani (1947–2007), Afghan poet
- Razik Fareed (1893–1984), Sri Lankan politician, diplomat and philanthropist

== People with the surname ==
- Abdul Raziq, one of the Pakistani detainees at Guantanamo Bay
- Ali Abdel Raziq (1888–1966), Egyptian scholar of Islam
- Ghulam Raziq (born 1932), Pakistani hurdler
- Shahier Razik (born 1977), Egyptian-Canadian squash player

== People with the nickname ==
- Abdul Raziq Achakzai (1979-2018), Afghan chief of police and warlord

== See also ==
- Razak (disambiguation)
- Razaq (disambiguation)
