= Sowmeeh, Torbat-e Heydarieh =

Village in Razavi Khorasan province, Iran

Sowmeeh Persian: صومعه
- Village
- Location within Iran
- Coordinates: 35°17′26″N 59°14′52″E
- Country: Iran
- Province: Razavi Khorasan
- County: Torbat-e Heydarieh
- District: Central
- Rural District: Bala Velayat

Population (2016)
  - Total: 1,940
- Time zone: UTC+3:30 (IRST)

Sowmeeh (Persian: صومعه) (Note: Also romanized as Şowma‘ah and Şowme‘eh) is a village in Bala Velayat Rural District of the Central District in Torbat-e Heydarieh County, Razavi Khorasan province, Iran.

== Demographics ==
=== Population ===
At the time of the 2006 National Census, the village's population was 1,694 in 459 households. The following census in 2011 counted 1,797 people in 554 households. The 2016 census measured the population of the village as 1,940 people in 622 households.
