= Quzan, Razavi Khorasan =

Quzan قوزان
- Village
- Location within Iran
- Coordinates: 35°12′36″N 59°09′10″E
- Country: Iran
- Province: Razavi Khorasan
- County: Torbat-e Heydarieh
- Bakhsh: Central
- Rural District: Pain Velayat

Population (2006)
  - Total: 346
- Time zone: UTC+3:30 (IRST)
  - Summer (DST): UTC+4:30 (IRDT)

Quzan (Persian: قوزان, also romanized as Qūzān) is a village in Pain Velayat Rural District, in the Central District of Torbat-e Heydarieh County, Razavi Khorasan Province, Iran. At the 2006 census, its population was 346, in 100 families.
