= Senowbar =

Village in Razavi Khorasan province, Iran

Senowbar Persian: صنوبر
- Village
- Location within Iran
- Coordinates: 35°25′07″N 59°07′57″E
- Country: Iran
- Province: Razavi Khorasan
- County: Torbat-e Heydarieh
- District: Central
- Rural District: Bala Velayat

Population (2016)
  - Total: 2,646
- Time zone: UTC+3:30 (IRST)

Senowbar (Persian: صنوبر) (Note: Also romanized as Sanowbar and Şenowbar; also known as Sanaubar) is a village in Bala Velayat Rural District of the Central District in Torbat-e Heydarieh County, Razavi Khorasan province, Iran.

== Demographics ==
=== Population ===
At the time of the 2006 National Census, the village's population was 1,246 in 319 households. The following census in 2011 counted 2,948 people in 392 households. The 2016 census measured the population of the village as 2,646 people in 347 households.
