= Hajji Yar =

Village in Razavi Khorasan province, Iran

Hajji Yar Persian: حاجي يار
- Village
- Location within Iran
- Coordinates: 35°15′28″N 59°14′25″E
- Country: Iran
- Province: Razavi Khorasan
- County: Torbat-e Heydarieh
- District: Central
- Rural District: Pain Velayat

Population (2016)
  - Total: 1,117
- Time zone: UTC+3:30 (IRST)

Hajji Yar (Persian: حاجي يار) (Note: Also romanized as Ḩājjī Yār) is a village in Pain Velayat Rural District of the Central District in Torbat-e Heydarieh County, Razavi Khorasan province, Iran.

== Demographics ==
=== Population ===
At the time of the 2006 National Census, the village's population was 540 in 129 households. The following census in 2011 counted 817 people in 232 households. The 2016 census recorded a population of the village as 1,117 people in 325 households.
