= Sar Kariz =

Sar Kariz or Sar-e Kariz or Sarkariz or Sar-e-Kariz or Sar-i-Kariz (Persian: سركاريز) may refer to:

- Sarkariz, Kurdistan
- Sar Kariz, Razavi Khorasan
- Sar-e-Kariz, South Khorasan
