= Oryan, Torbat-e Heydarieh =

Village in Razavi Khorasan province, Iran

Oryan Persian: عريان
- Village
- Location within Iran
- Coordinates: 35°16′29″N 59°14′46″E
- Country: Iran
- Province: Razavi Khorasan
- County: Torbat-e Heydarieh
- District: Central
- Rural District: Pain Velayat

Population (2016)
  - Total: 1,021
- Time zone: UTC+3:30 (IRST)

Oryan (Persian: عريان) (Note: Also romanized as ‘Oryān) is a village in Pain Velayat Rural District of the Central District in Torbat-e Heydarieh County, Razavi Khorasan province, Iran.

== Demographics ==
=== Population ===
At the time of the 2006 National Census, the village's population was 426 in 110 households. The following census in 2011 counted 717 people in 211 households. The 2016 census recorded a population of the village as 1,021 people in 301 households.
