= Khvoresh Bar =

Village in Razavi Khorasan province, Iran

Khvoresh Bar Persian: خورش بر
- Village
- Location within Iran
- Coordinates: 35°19′47″N 59°00′45″E
- Country: Iran
- Province: Razavi Khorasan
- County: Torbat-e Heydarieh
- District: Bayg
- Rural District: Bayg

Population (2016)
  - Total: 316
- Time zone: UTC+3:30 (IRST)

Khvoresh Bar (Persian: خورش بر) (Note: Also known as Khūresh and Kūresh Bar) is a village in Bayg Rural District of Bayg District in Torbat-e Heydarieh County, Razavi Khorasan province, Iran.

== Demographics ==
=== Population ===
At the time of the 2006 National Census, the village's population was 350 in 93 households. The following census in 2011 counted 281 people in 96 households. The 2016 census measured the population of the village as 316 people in 113 households.
