= Buriabad =

Village in Razavi Khorasan province, Iran

Buriabad Persian: بوري اباد
- Village
- Location within Iran
- Coordinates: 35°12′35″N 59°11′47″E
- Country: Iran
- Province: Razavi Khorasan
- County: Torbat-e Heydarieh
- District: Central
- Rural District: Pain Velayat

Population (2016)
  - Total: 626
- Time zone: UTC+3:30 (IRST)

Buriabad (Persian: بوري اباد) (Note: Also romanized as Būrīābād; also known as Bīrīābād) is a village in, and the capital of, Pain Velayat Rural District in the Central District of Torbat-e Heydarieh County, Razavi Khorasan province, Iran.

== Demographics ==
=== Population ===
At the time of the 2006 National Census, the village's population was 616 in 170 households. The following census in 2011 counted 599 people in 178 households. The 2016 census measured the population of the village as 626 people in 202 households.
