= Khuresh, Iran =

Khuresh (Persian: خورش) may refer to:

- Khuresh, Qazvin
- Khuresh, Razavi Khorasan
