= Manzar, Torbat-e Heydarieh =

Village in Razavi Khorasan province, Iran

Manzar Persian: منظر
- Village
- Location within Iran
- Coordinates: 35°18′08″N 59°14′26″E
- Country: Iran
- Province: Razavi Khorasan
- County: Torbat-e Heydarieh
- District: Central
- Rural District: Bala Velayat

Population (2016)
  - Total: 3,111
- Time zone: UTC+3:30 (IRST)

Manzar (Persian: منظر) (Note: Also romanized as Manz̧ar) is a village in Bala Velayat Rural District of the Central District in Torbat-e Heydarieh County, Razavi Khorasan province, Iran.

== Demographics ==
=== Population ===
At the time of the 2006 National Census, the village's population was 2,120 in 614 households. The following census in 2011 counted 2,519 people in 828 households. The 2016 census measured the population of the village as 3,111 people in 952 households, the most populous in its rural district.
