= Aghuyeh =

Aghuyeh or Aghooyeh or Aghveyeh or Aghviyeh (Persian: اغويه) may refer to:

- Aghuyeh, East Azerbaijan
- Aghuyeh, Razavi Khorasan
