= Basima Abdulrahman =

Iraqi engineer

- بەسیما عەبدولڕەحمان
- Born: Baghdad, Iraq
- Education: University of Duhok (BSc); Auburn University (MSc)
- Occupations: Structural engineer, entrepreneur
- Known for: Founding KESK, Green building in Iraq
- Title: Founder and CEO of KESK
- Awards: Cartier Women's Initiative Award (2021); BBC 100 Women (2023)

Basima Abdulrahman (Kurdish: بەسیما عەبدولڕەحمان)(born 1986/1987) is a Kurdish Iraqi structural engineer and the founder of KESK (meaning Green in Kurdish), an Iraqi company specialized in eco-friendly architecture.

== Early life and education ==
Abdulrahman's parents moved to Baghdad, Iraq from southern Turkey; she was born in Iraq, and has both Turkish and Kurdish heritage. In 2006, the Iraqi conflict drove her family to relocate to the Kurdistan region of northern Iraq. As a result, Abdulrahman learned more about and became closer to her Kurdish heritage.

As a child, Abdulrahman's family encouraged her to become a doctor, but she disliked biology, instead preferring math and physics.

She graduated from University of Duhok with a baccalaureate degree in Civil Engineering. In 2011, Abdulrahman applied for a Fulbright Scholarship to study in the United States. Abdulrahman attended Auburn University in the United States, where she earned a master's degree in structural and civil engineering, graduating in 2014. She returned to the United States in 2016, where she completed a program by the US Green Building Council to become an accredited professional.

== Career ==
When she returned to Iraq in 2015, Abdulrahman initially worked as a structural engineer for the United Nations.

In 2017, Abdulrahman founded KESK Green Building Consulting, the first Iraqi company to focus on "green" architecture. It took Abdulrahman nine months before she was able to find her first client. KESK combines modern environmentally-friendly building techniques with ancient techniques, such as building dome-shaped homes from clay bricks. The company also seeks to provide alternative energy sources to communities, particularly solar energy, in response to Iraq's unstable power grid. The company was also founded in part to assist with reconstruction following the war against the Islamic State, which began in 2014.

Abdulrahman also works for the UN's Food and Agriculture Organization as a national consultant and project manager, and as vice curator for the Global Shapers Erbil Hub, an initiative of the World Economic Forum.

== Recognition ==
In 2021, Abdulrahman was one of eight entrepreneurs who won the Cartier Women's Initiative Award, with Abdulrahman representing the "Middle East & North Africa" category. She received $100,000 in prize money.

In November 2023, Abdulrahman was named to the BBC's 100 Women list.

== Personal life ==
As of 2019, Abdulrahman is based in Erbil.
