= Tajrud =

Tajrud or Taj Rud (Persian: تجرود) may refer to:

- Tajrud, Qom
- Tajrud, Kashmar, Razavi Khorasan Province
- Tajrud, Torbat-e Heydarieh, Razavi Khorasan Province
