= Asan Cups =

Asan (meaning 'easy' in Devanagari, Urdu, Persian) is a for-profit social enterprise that distributes reusable menstrual products with the goal of addressing period poverty and improving menstrual health in rural parts of the India where 23 million girls drop out of school annually due to lack of menstruation facilities. Asan serves low income and underserved communities like in India, African nations. The organisation operates on one-for-one model (model used by Toms Shoes) where commercial sales fund the donation of products to individuals who cannot afford safe period care.

== History ==
The organisation was founded by Ira Guha and Anuradha Mahadevan. Ira while studying at Harvard Kennedy School collaborated with engineer Daniela Teran to design an alternative menstrual cup at the Harvard Innovation Lab (i-lab) aiming to create a product that was physically accessible to individuals unfamiliar with initial period products. The resulting device features a patented ring loop design to facilitate ease of removal, rather than a traditional solid stem. Manufactured using USP Class VI grade silicone.

== Operations & Impact ==
Asan coordinates distribution via regional partnerships with Non-governmental organization (NGO's) and Corporate social responsibility (CSR) initiatives. Parts of rural India catering to migrant communities, fragile waste ecosystems with poor disposal infrastructure such as Leh in India and Zanzibar in Tanzania, parts of Ghana and Malawi. The organisation hosts grassroot workshops to teach sanitation protocols and reduce social stigma. Over 15,000 women in 60 villages across Karnataka have transitioned using their 6-month behavioral change model.

One of the Founder Ira Guha was awarded a fellowship by Cartier Women's Initiative the CSR initiative of French luxury jewel maker Cartier (jeweler). Asan also received award from Innovate UK and product design from London newspaper Evening Standard.
