= Deh-e Pain, Razavi Khorasan =

Village in Razavi Khorasan province, Iran

Deh-e Pain Persian: ده پايين
- Village
- Location within Iran
- Coordinates: 35°17′22″N 59°10′57″E
- Country: Iran
- Province: Razavi Khorasan
- County: Torbat-e Heydarieh
- District: Central
- Rural District: Bala Velayat

Population (2016)
  - Total: 2,973
- Time zone: UTC+3:30 (IRST)

Deh-e Pain (Persian: ده پايين) (Note: Also romanized as Deh Pā’īn and Deh-e Pā’īn) is a village in Bala Velayat Rural District of the Central District in Torbat-e Heydarieh County, Razavi Khorasan province, Iran.

== Demographics ==
=== Population ===
At the time of the 2006 National Census, the village's population was 1,751 in 454 households. The following census in 2011 counted 2,219 people in 675 households. The 2016 census measured the population of the village as 2,973 people in 888 households.
