= Baba Rud =

Baba Rud or Babarud (Persian: بابارود) may refer to:

- Baba Rud, Hamadan
- Babarud, West Azerbaijan
