= Oryan =

Oryan (Persian: عریان) may refer to:

- Oryan, Lorestan
- Oryan, Sabzevar, Razavi Khorasan Province
- Oryan, Torbat-e Heydarieh, Razavi Khorasan Province
