= Damask (disambiguation) =

Damask may refer to:

- A tapestry-woven fabric, see Damask
- Damask, Iran, a village in Razavi Khorasan Province, Iran
- A flower commonly known as the Damask rose or simply as "Damask", see Rosa damascena
- A fictional character in the Marvel Comics Universe, see Emma Steed
- A fictional character from Star Wars named Hego Damask, alias Darth Plagueis
