= Aghuyeh, Razavi Khorasan =

Village in Razavi Khorasan province, Iran

Aghuyeh Persian: اغويه
- Village
- Location within Iran
- Coordinates: 35°18′17″N 59°12′21″E
- Country: Iran
- Province: Razavi Khorasan
- County: Torbat-e Heydarieh
- District: Central
- Rural District: Bala Velayat

Population (2016)
  - Total: 2,220
- Time zone: UTC+3:30 (IRST)

Aghuyeh (Persian: اغويه) (Note: Also romanized as Āghūyeh) is a village in Bala Velayat Rural District of the Central District in Torbat-e Heydarieh County, Razavi Khorasan province, Iran.

== Demographics ==
=== Population ===
At the time of the 2006 National Census, the village's population was 841 in 232 households. The following census in 2011 counted 1,324 people in 399 households. The 2016 census measured the population of the village as 2,220 people in 671 households.
