= Lianna Gunawan =

Indonesian businesswoman

- Born: Semarang, Indonesia
- Education: University of New South Wales, Australia
- Occupation: Businesswoman
- Organization: La Spina
- Awards: Cartier Women's Initiative Award (2012)

Lianna Gunawan is an Indonesian businesswoman. In 2012 she was awarded the Cartier Women's Initiative Award for the Asia-Pacific region for founding La Spina, a footwear business that designs and produces shoes featuring Indonesian materials.

== Biography ==
Gunawan was born in Semarang, Indonesia, and studied tourism and hospitality at the University of New South Wales, Australia. She started La Spina as a re-seller of shoes, then moved into designing and producing handmade shoes with a team of craftspeople. Her shoe designs feature handmade Indonesian batik fabrics, local wood and Javanese carving techniques.

In 2012 she was awarded the Cartier Women's Initiative Award for the Asia-Pacific region.
