= Razzaq =

Razzaq, Razzak or Razak (Arabic, Persian, Urdu: رزاق) is one of the names of God in Islam, meaning provider or sustainer. Razzaq may refer to:

== People ==
- Abdul Razzaq (cricketer) (born 1979), Pakistani cricketer
- Abdur Razzaq, a given name and surname (including a list of people with the name)
- Abdur Razzak (actor) (1942–2017), Bangladeshi actor commonly known as Razzak
- Razak Omotoyossi (1985–2025), Beninese footballer
- Razzaq Farhan (born 1977), Iraqi footballer and Olympic athlete
- Sheikh Razzak Ali (1928–2015), Bangladeshi politician
- Zahid Razzak (born 1967), Bangladeshi cricketer, played 1988–1990
- Abdur Razzak (cricketer) (born 1982), Bangladeshi cricketer

== Buildings and places ==
- Razzaq, Iran, a village in Razavi Khorasan Province, Iran
- Ar-Razzaq Islamic Center, a mosque in Durham, North Carolina, U.S.

== See also ==
- Razaq (disambiguation)
