= Chinwe Ohajuruka =

Nigerian architect

- Born: Chinwe; 1960 (age 65–66); Nigerian
- Citizenship: Nigeria
- Occupation: Architect
- Awards: Cartier Women's Initiative Awards

Chinwe Ohajuruka is a green Architect born in Nigerian. She divides her time between Nigeria and the United States for projects. She became the Sub-Saharan African Laureate for the Cartier Women's Initiative Awards in France in 2015 for her contribution in affordable green houses and social entrepreneurship.

== Career ==
Ohajuruka is the CEO, Architect, Sustainability Consultant and Project Manager for Comprehensive Design Services, a company that designs and builds solar affordable housing; a company she founded in 2012. Her company produces housing using a technique called Bio-Climatic Design, that uses design strategies and engineering techniques that are suited to the local climate, and incorporated solar powered wells. She moved to the U.S. from Nigeria in 2003.

== Awards ==
Ohajuruka was named a "Great Energy Challenge Innovator" and awarded a grant by National Geographic for her project in Port Harcourt, Nigeria, Affordable housing with renewable energy for Nigeria. She also received a Science and Technology award from the Chenving Foundation. She was awarded a Cartier Women's Initiative Award. Her company has also received grants from the USAID and Western Union Foundation.
