= Bayg Rural District =

Rural district in Razavi Khorasan province, Iran

Bayg Rural District دهستان بایگ
- Rural District
- Location within Iran
- Coordinates: 35°22′N 58°57′E
- Country: Iran
- Province: Razavi Khorasan
- County: Torbat-e Heydarieh
- District: Bayg
- Capital: Bayg

Population (2016)
  - Total: 3,392
- Time zone: UTC+3:30 (IRST)

Bayg Rural District (Persian: دهستان بایگ) (Note: Also known as Bayk Rural District (دهستان بايك)) is in Bayg District, Torbat-e Heydarieh County, Razavi Khorasan province, Iran. It is administered from the city of Bayg.

== Demographics ==
=== Population ===
At the time of the 2006 National Census, the rural district's population was 4,367 in 1,359 households. There were 3,584 inhabitants in 1,337 households at the following census of 2011. The 2016 census measured the population of the rural district as 3,392 in 1,270 households. The most populous of its 46 villages was Hesar, with 1,178 people.

=== Other villages in the rural district ===
- Besk
- Fadihah
- Gashn
- Khvoresh Bar
- Razg
- Rud Majan
- Sorkhabad
