= Bayg =

City in Razavi Khorasan province, Iran

Bayg Persian: بایگ
- City
- Location within Iran
- Coordinates: 35°22′28″N 59°02′20″E
- Country: Iran
- Province: Razavi Khorasan
- County: Torbat-e Heydarieh
- District: Bayg

Population (2016)
  - Total: 3,545
- Time zone: UTC+3:30 (IRST)

Bayg (Persian: بایگ) (Note: Also romanized as Bāyg; also known as Bāyk (بايك)) is a city in, and the capital of, Bayg District in Torbat-e Heydarieh County, Razavi Khorasan province, Iran. It also serves as the administrative center for Bayg Rural District.

== Demographics ==
=== Population ===
At the time of the 2006 National Census, the city's population was 3,960 in 1,106 households. The following census in 2011 counted 3,577 people in 1,048 households. The 2016 census measured the population of the city as 3,545 people in 1,154 households.
