= List of earthquakes in 1923 =

Earthquakes in 1923
Approximate epicenters of the earthquakes in 1923
- 4.0–5.9 magnitude
- 6.0–6.9 magnitude
- 7.0–7.9 magnitude
- 8.0+ magnitude
- Strongest: Russian SFSR, eastern Kamchatka Peninsula, February 3 (Magnitude 8.4)
- Deadliest: Japan, Kanagawa Prefecture, Honshu, September 1 (Magnitude 8.1) 186,283 deaths
- Total fatalities: 194,102

Number by magnitude
- 9.0+: 0
- 8.0–8.9: 2
- 7.0–7.9: 15
- 6.0–6.9: 51
- 5.0–5.9: 2

1923 was a memorable year for earthquakes. Among the events was the great Tokyo, Japan earthquake. Other destructive earthquakes struck China, Iran, Colombia and Russia. The Kamchatka Peninsula, Russia and Japan saw very much activity this year.

The earthquakes listed here include those of magnitude 6.0 or greater; lower magnitude events are included if they caused death, injury or damage. Events which occurred in remote areas are excluded as they would not have generated significant media interest. All dates are listed according to UTC time.

== Overall ==
=== By death toll ===
Rank	Death toll	Magnitude	Location	MMI	Depth (km)	Date
1	186,283	7.9	Japan, Kanagawa Prefecture, Honshu	XI (Extreme)	15.0	September 1
2	4,800	7.0	China, Sichuan	X (Extreme)	15.0	March 24
3	2,200	5.7	Iran, Razavi Khorasan Province	X (Extreme)	0.0	May 25
4	300	5.3	Colombia, Narino Department	IX (Violent)	0.0	December 14
5	290	6.8	Iran, Kerman Province	( )	15.0	September 22
6	157	6.4	Iran, Razavi Khorasan Province	( )	15.0	September 17
7	51	6.8	Ecuador, Pichincha Province	IX (Violent)	0.0	February 24
8	18	6.8	Russian SFSR, eastern Kamchatka Peninsula	X (Extreme)	35.0	April 13

- Note: At least 10 casualties

=== By magnitude ===
Rank	Magnitude	Death toll	Location	MMI	Depth (km)	Date
1	8.4	3	Russian SFSR, eastern Kamchatka Peninsula	XI (Extreme)	15.0	February 3
2	8.1	186,283	Japan, Kanagawa Prefecture, Honshu	XI (Extreme)	15.0	September 1
3	7.8	0	Japan, Chiba Prefecture, Honshu	( )	15.0	September 2
4	7.4	0	Dutch East Indies, Raja Ampat Islands	( )	15.0	October 7
= 5	7.3	0	Russian SFSR, off the east coast of Kamchatka Peninsula	( )	15.0	February 24
= 5	7.3	0	Japan, off the south coast of Honshu	( )	35.0	September 1
= 6	7.2	0	Russian SFSR, off the east coast of Kamchatka Peninsula	( )	35.0	February 2
= 6	7.2	0	British Burma, Shan State	( )	25.0	June 22
= 6	7.2	0	New Guinea, northwest of Bougainville Island	( )	145.1	November 2
= 7	7.1	0	Japan, off the east coast of Honshu	( )	35.0	June 1
= 7	7.1	0	Japan, off the south coast of Honshu	( )	35.0	September 2
= 8	7.0	0	Philippines, Mindanao	VII (Very strong)	15.0	March 2
= 8	7.0	4,800	China, Sichuan	X (Extreme)	15.0	March 24
= 8	7.0	0	United States, south of the Alaska Peninsula	( )	25.0	May 4
= 8	7.0	0	Japan, south of Kyushu	( )	35.0	July 13
= 8	7.0	0	Japan, Tokyo Bay, Honshu	( )	35.0	September 1
= 8	7.0	0	New Guinea, southeast New Ireland (island)	( )	35.0	November 4

- Note: At least 7.0 magnitude

== Notable events ==
=== January ===
January
- Strongest: 6.9 M_{w} United States
- Total fatalities: 0

Number by magnitude
- 8.0–8.9: 0
- 7.0–7.9: 0
- 6.0–6.9: 1

Date	Country and location	M_{w}	Depth (km)	MMI	Notes	Casualties	
Date	Country and location	M_{w}	Depth (km)	MMI	Notes	Dead	Injured
22	United States, off the coast of northern California	6.9	15.0	VIII	Some damage was reported.		

=== February ===
February
- Strongest: 8.4 M_{w} Russian SFSR
- Deadliest: 6.8 M_{w} Ecuador; 51+ deaths
- Total fatalities: 54+

Number by magnitude
- 8.0–8.9: 1
- 7.0–7.9: 2
- 6.0–6.9: 4

Date	Country and location	M_{w}	Depth (km)	MMI	Notes	Casualties	
Date	Country and location	M_{w}	Depth (km)	MMI	Notes	Dead	Injured
1	France, southeast of the Loyalty Islands	6.9	30.0				
2	Russian SFSR, off the east coast of Kamchatka	6.7	15.0		Foreshock.		
2	Russian SFSR, off the east coast of Kamchatka	7.2	35.0		Foreshock.		
3	Russian SFSR, eastern Kamchatka	8.4	15.0	XI	The February 1923 Kamchatka earthquake generated a large tsunami which caused some damage. Three deaths were reported. Two were in Russia with the third being in Hawaii. Damage costs were $1.5 million (1923 rate).	3	
23	Dutch East Indies, Central Sulawesi	6.5	35.0				
24	Ecuador, Pichincha Province	6.8	0.0	IX	At least 51 deaths were caused.	51+	
24	Russian SFSR, off the east coast of Kamchatka	7.3	15.0		Some damage was caused.		

=== March ===
March
- Strongest: 7.0 M_{w} 2 events
- Deadliest: 7.0 M_{w} China; 4,800 deaths
- Total fatalities: 4,800

Number by magnitude
- 8.0–8.9: 0
- 7.0–7.9: 2
- 6.0–6.9: 2

Date	Country and location	M_{w}	Depth (km)	MMI	Notes	Casualties	
Date	Country and location	M_{w}	Depth (km)	MMI	Notes	Dead	Injured
2	Philippines, Mindanao	7.0	15.0	VII			
14	Philippines, southeast of Mindanao	6.4	35.0				
16	Philippines, southeast of Mindanao	6.8	35.0				
24	China, Sichuan	7.0	15.0	X	The 1923 Renda earthquake killed 4,800 people and caused major property damage.	4,800	

=== April ===
April
- Strongest: 8.2 M_{w} 2 events
- Deadliest: 8.2 M_{w} Russian SFSR; 18 deaths
- Total fatalities: 18

Number by magnitude
- 8.0–8.9: 1
- 7.0–7.9: 0
- 6.0–6.9: 3

Date	Country and location	M_{w}	Depth (km)	MMI	Notes	Casualties	
Date	Country and location	M_{w}	Depth (km)	MMI	Notes	Dead	Injured
13	Russian SFSR, eastern Kamchatka	8.2	35.0	X	18 people were killed due to a tsunami caused by the April 1923 Kamchatka earthquake and tsunami. 400 people were believed drowned in Korea. Major damage was reported.	18	
19	Dutch East Indies, Kalimantan	6.8	35.0				
23	Japan, Ryukyu Islands	6.6	20.0				

=== May ===
May
- Strongest: 7.0 M_{w} United States
- Deadliest: 5.7 M_{w} Iran; 2,200 deaths
- Total fatalities: 2,200

Number by magnitude
- 8.0–8.9: 0
- 7.0–7.9: 1
- 6.0–6.9: 3
- 5.0–5.9: 1

Date	Country and location	M_{w}	Depth (km)	MMI	Notes	Casualties	
Date	Country and location	M_{w}	Depth (km)	MMI	Notes	Dead	Injured
4	United States, south of the Alaska Peninsula	7.0	25.0				
4	Chile, Atacama Region	6.5	35.0		Some homes were damaged or destroyed.		
12	Dutch East Indies, Sunda Strait	6.4	25.0				
15	Dutch East Indies, off the south coast of Java	0.0	0.0	IX	Damage was reported in the area. The magnitude and depth were unknown.		
23	Russian SFSR, off the east coast of Kamchatka	6.5	15.0				
25	Iran, Razavi Khorasan Province	5.7	0.0	X	Main article: 1923 Torbat-e Heydarieh earthquake	2,200	

=== June ===
June
- Strongest: 7.2 M_{w} British Burma
- Total fatalities: 0

Number by magnitude
- 8.0–8.9: 0
- 7.0–7.9: 2
- 6.0–6.9: 2

Date	Country and location	M_{w}	Depth (km)	MMI	Notes	Casualties	
Date	Country and location	M_{w}	Depth (km)	MMI	Notes	Dead	Injured
1	Japan, off the east coast of Honshu	6.9	15.0	rowspan="2"|This pair of events struck three hours apart and is an example of a doublet earthquake.			
1	Japan, off the east coast of Honshu	7.1	35.0				
Jun 18	Tonga	6.8	15.0				
22	British Burma, Shan State	7.2	25.0				

=== July ===
July
- Strongest: 7.0 M_{w} Japan
- Total fatalities: 0

Number by magnitude
- 8.0–8.9: 0
- 7.0–7.9: 1
- 6.0–6.9: 4

Date	Country and location	M_{w}	Depth (km)	MMI	Notes	Casualties	
Date	Country and location	M_{w}	Depth (km)	MMI	Notes	Dead	Injured
2	Taiwan, north of	6.2	25.0				
12	Fiji, north of Vanua Levu	6.4	15.0				
13	Japan, off the south coast of Kyushu	7.0	35.0				
13	Japan, east of Tanegashima	6.6	35.0		Aftershock.		
23	United States, south of Loma Linda, California	6.2	35.0		Two people were injured and several buildings at Patton State Hospital were irreparably damaged; other minor damage was caused.		

=== August ===
August
- Strongest: 6.6 M_{w} Japan
- Total fatalities: 0

Number by magnitude
- 8.0–8.9: 0
- 7.0–7.9: 0
- 6.0–6.9: 5

Date	Country and location	M_{w}	Depth (km)	MMI	Notes	Casualties	
Date	Country and location	M_{w}	Depth (km)	MMI	Notes	Dead	Injured
1	Greece, south of Crete	6.5	35.0				
8	Venezuela, Sucre, Venezuela	6.3	110.0				
11	Malaya, Sabah	6.3	35.0				
12	Japan, Ryukyu Islands	6.6	35.0				
28	Mexico, Gulf of California	6.5	10.0				

=== September ===
September
- Strongest: 8.1 M_{w} Japan
- Deadliest: 8.1 M_{w} Japan; 186,283 deaths
- Total fatalities: 186,730

Number by magnitude
- 8.0–8.9: 1
- 7.0–7.9: 4
- 6.0–6.9: 13

Date	Country and location	M_{w}	Depth (km)	MMI	Notes	Casualties	
Date	Country and location	M_{w}	Depth (km)	MMI	Notes	Dead	Injured
1	Japan, Kanagawa Prefecture, Honshu	8.1	15.0	XI	The 1923 Great Kantō earthquake was one of the most destructive of the 20th Century. Tokyo and surrounding areas suffered heavily both in human and material terms. The death toll was 142,807 with another 43,476 missing. Another 47,000 were injured. Strong aftershocks rattled the region and the fires associated with the earthquakes caused further disruption. Property damage was $600 million (1923 rate). 695,000 homes were destroyed.	186,283	47,000
1	Japan, off the south coast of Honshu	6.5	60.0		Aftershock.		
1	Japan, off the south coast of Honshu	7.3	35.0		Aftershock.		
1	Japan, Kanagawa Prefecture, Honshu	6.6	35.0		Aftershock.		
1	Japan, off the south coast of Honshu	7.0	35.0		Aftershock.		
1	Japan, Shizuoka Prefecture, Honshu	6.7	35.0		Aftershock.		
1	Japan, off the east coast of Honshu	6.5	35.0		Aftershock.		
1	Japan, off the south coast of Honshu	6.4	15.0		Aftershock.		
2	Japan, off the south coast of Honshu	7.8	15.0		Aftershock.		
2	Japan, off the south coast of Honshu	7.1	35.0		Aftershock.		
2	Japan, Kanagawa Prefecture, Honshu	6.5	5.0		Aftershock.		
2	Bolivia, Beni Department	6.8	35.0				
9	Bangladesh, Netrokona District	6.8	15.0				
14	Mongolia, Zavkhan Province	6.2	35.0				
16	Dutch East Indies, Papua (province)	6.5	35.0				
17	Iran, Razavi Khorasan Province	6.4	15.0	IX	157 people were killed and major damage was caused.	157	
22	Iran, Kerman Province	6.8	15.0		290 people were killed.	290	
26	Japan, off the south coast of Honshu	6.5	10.0		Aftershock.		

=== October ===
October
- Strongest: 7.4 M_{w} Dutch East Indies
- Total fatalities: 0

Number by magnitude
- 8.0–8.9: 0
- 7.0–7.9: 1
- 6.0–6.9: 3

Date	Country and location	M_{w}	Depth (km)	MMI	Notes	Casualties	
Date	Country and location	M_{w}	Depth (km)	MMI	Notes	Dead	Injured
1	Bangladesh, Punjab, Pakistan	6.3	15.0				
7	Dutch East Indies, Raja Ampat Islands	7.4	15.0				
10	Norway, north of Jan Mayen	6.5	15.0				
15	Dutch East Indies, southern Sumba	6.3	35.0				

=== November ===
November
- Strongest: 7.2 M_{w} New Guinea
- Total fatalities: 0

Number by magnitude
- 8.0–8.9: 0
- 7.0–7.9: 2
- 6.0–6.9: 6

Date	Country and location	M_{w}	Depth (km)	MMI	Notes	Casualties	
Date	Country and location	M_{w}	Depth (km)	MMI	Notes	Dead	Injured
2	New Guinea, northwest of Bougainville Island	7.2	145.1				
3	Haiti, Gulf of Gonâve	6.0	35.0				
3	Japan, Ryukyu Islands	6.8	35.0				
4	New Guinea, southeast New Ireland	7.0	35.0				
5	Japan, Ryukyu Islands	6.9	35.0				
6	Chile, Araucanía Region	6.2	35.0				
6	Japan, Ryukyu Islands	6.5	35.0				
18	Taiwan, east of	6.6	25.0				

=== December ===
December
- Strongest: 6.5 M_{w} 2 events
- Deadliest: 5.3 M_{w} Colombia; 300 deaths
- Total fatalities: 300

Number by magnitude
- 8.0–8.9: 0
- 7.0–7.9: 0
- 6.0–6.9: 3
- 5.0–5.9: 1

Date	Country and location	M_{w}	Depth (km)	MMI	Notes	Casualties	
Date	Country and location	M_{w}	Depth (km)	MMI	Notes	Dead	Injured
4	Japan, south of Shikoku	6.5	5.0				
5	Greece, Aegean Sea	6.2	10.0				
14	Colombia, Narino Department	5.3	0.0	IX	300 people were killed and major damage was caused.	300	
28	Turkestan ASSR, Sughd Region	6.5	20.0				
