= Kesk =

Kesk may refer to:

== Organisations ==
- Confederation of Public Workers' Unions (Turkish: Kamu Emekçileri Sendikaları Konfederasyonu)
- Finnish Centre Party (Finnish: Suomen Keskusta)
- Estonian Centre Party (Estonian: Eesti Keskerakond)

== Places in Iran ==
- Gesk, a village in North Khorasan Province
- Kasgak, a village in Razavi Khorasan Province
