= Ann Kihengu =

Tanzanian entrepreneur and distributor

- Born: 1983 (age 42–43)
- Education: Business Administration
- Occupation: CEO
- Awards: 2010 Africa Laureate of the Cartier Women's Initiative Award

Ann Kihengu (born 1983) is a Tanzanian entrepreneur, distributor, and winner of the 2010 Africa Laureate of the Cartier Women's Initiative Awards for her work to replace the use of kerosene lamps by distributing solar lamps and solar phone chargers in Tanzania via a network of young entrepreneurs. Kihengu is also a member of the World Entrepreneurship Forum Think Tank.

== Biography ==
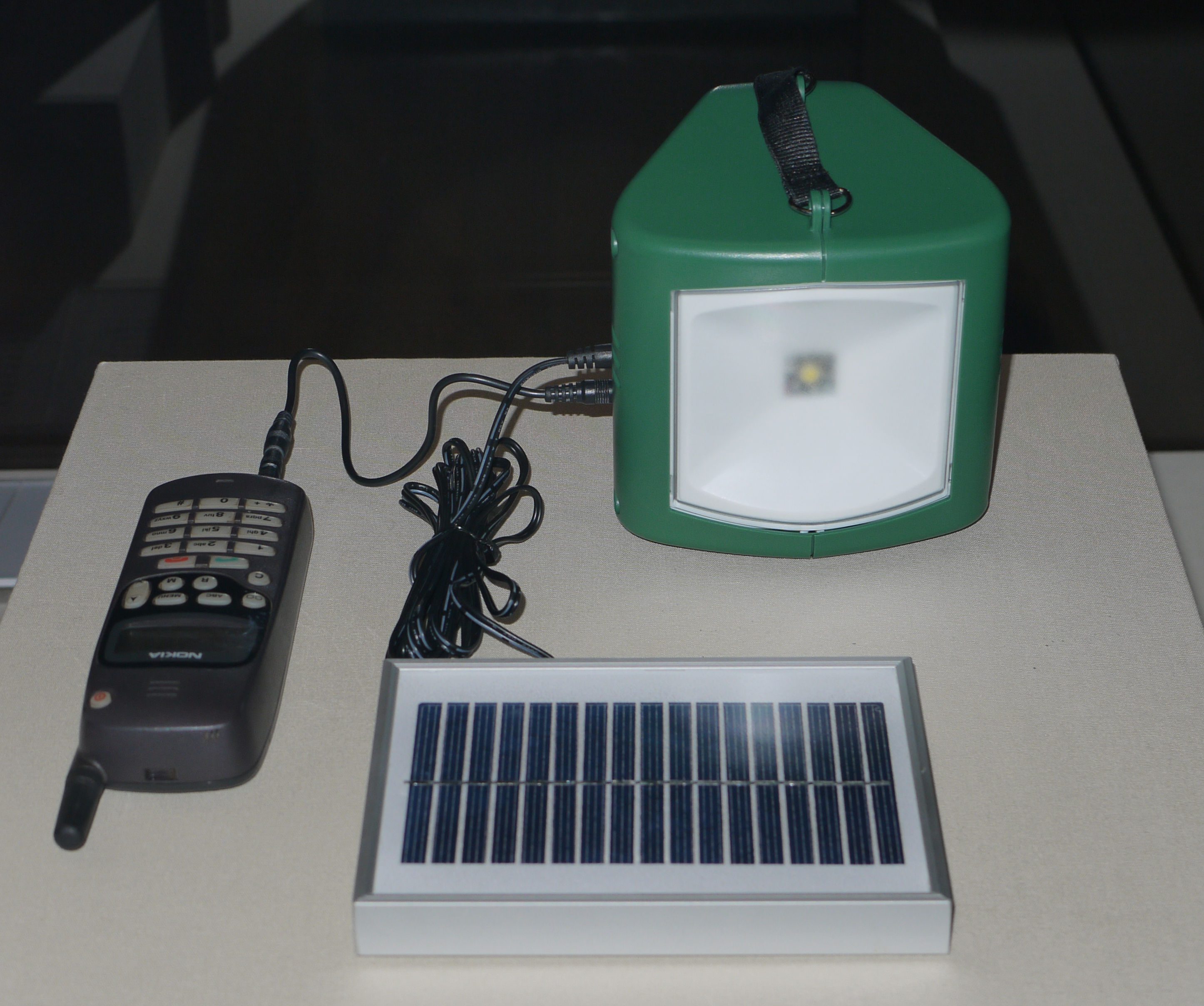
Solar Powered lamp and charger similar to those distributed by Priam.

Kihengu grew up in the north eastern part of Tanzania. She studied Business Administration, and after graduation she spent three years working in the solar power industry. During this time she identified a problem with distribution of the products. So at the age of 26 she resigned from her position and started up her own company, Prian, in 2009 and worked in partnership with D.Light to distribute low cost solar lamps and phone chargers.

Due to the difficulties of transport in Tanzania (poor road conditions and immobilisation during the wet season), Kihengu set up a distribution model utilising a Tanzanian social media platform and a series of village seminars to secondary school students around the country, in order to recruit and train young people to serve as distributors for her new business. She trained up her recruits in marketing and entrepreneurial skills, enabling them to take her business and bring solar lamps to villages in remote areas.

Starting with only 3 lamps, in the space of one year Kihengu became a leading distributor of D.Light products in Tanzania, selling over 10,000 units per year.

In 2012 Kihengu was one of a group of nine women sponsored by the U.S. State Department's International Visitor Leadership Program to meet with the Center for Women's Entrepreneurship at Chatham University to address business challenges.

Kerosene lamps are used for lighting in Tanzania (and areas of Africa and Asia) where electricity is either unavailable, or expensive. The World Health Organisation findings conclude that use of kerosene lamps in households "results in emissions of health-damaging pollutant at levels consistent with risks to health".
