= Deh-e Pain-e Darb Kalat =

Deh-e Pain-e Darb Kalat ده پائين درب كلات
- Village
- Location within Iran
- Coordinates: 31°09′21″N 51°06′05″E
- Country: Iran
- Province: Kohgiluyeh and Boyer-Ahmad
- County: Dana
- Bakhsh: Pataveh
- Rural District: Sadat Mahmudi

Population (2006)
  - Total: 181
- Time zone: UTC+3:30 (IRST)
  - Summer (DST): UTC+4:30 (IRDT)

Deh-e Pain-e Darb Kalat (Persian: ده پائين درب كلات, also Romanized as Deh-e Pā’īn-e Darb Kalāt; also known as Deh-e Pā’īn) is a village in Sadat Mahmudi Rural District, Pataveh District, Dana County, Kohgiluyeh and Boyer-Ahmad Province, Iran. At the 2006 census, its population was 181, in 33 families.
