= Razaq =

Razaq is generally the second element of the given name Abdur Razzaq. The first element may be variously spelled or omitted, and in modern usage the whole or the second element maybe used as a surname. Notable people with the name include:

- Razaq Mamoon (born 1964), ethnic Tajik writer and politician in Afghanistan
- Razaq Nadeem, Hong Kong resident of Pakistani origin convicted of murdering three prostitutes in Hong Kong
- Abd al Razaq Abdallah Hamid Ibrahim al Sharikh, Saudi man, held in extrajudicial detention in the United States Guantanamo Bay detainment camps
- Abdul Razaq (Guantanamo detainee 356), young Afghani man, the first detainee to be released from Guantanamo Bay, Cuba
- Bello Razaq (born 1984), Nigerian football player
- Omar Abd al-Razaq, Palestinian politician and minister
- Vince Macaulay-Razaq (born 1961), basketball player, then owner of British Basketball League franchise Milton Keynes Lions

== See also ==
- Rasak
- Raziq (disambiguation) / Razik
- Razzaq (disambiguation)
- Abdur Razzaq (disambiguation) and variants
