= Kaj Derakht, Mashhad =

Kaj Derakht كج درخت
- Village
- Location within Iran
- Coordinates: 36°17′21″N 59°42′46″E
- Country: Iran
- Province: Razavi Khorasan
- County: Mashhad
- Bakhsh: Central
- Rural District: Kenevist

Population (2006)
  - Total: 9
- Time zone: UTC+3:30 (IRST)
  - Summer (DST): UTC+4:30 (IRDT)

Kaj Derakht (Persian: كج درخت; also known as Kach Derakht) is a village in Kenevist Rural District, in the Central District of Mashhad County, Razavi Khorasan Province, Iran. At the 2006 census, its population was 9, in 5 families.
