= Razg, Gonabad =

Razg رزگ
- Village
- Location within Iran
- Coordinates: 34°06′41″N 58°43′51″E
- Country: Iran
- Province: Razavi Khorasan
- County: Gonabad
- Bakhsh: Kakhk
- Rural District: Kakhk

Population (2006)
  - Total: 35
- Time zone: UTC+3:30 (IRST)
  - Summer (DST): UTC+4:30 (IRDT)

Razg (Persian: رزگ, also Romanized as Razk) is a village in Kakhk Rural District, Kakhk District, Gonabad County, Razavi Khorasan Province, Iran. At the 2006 census, its population was 35, in 9 families.
