= Razg, Torbat-e Heydarieh =

Village in Razavi Khorasan province, Iran

Razg Persian: رزگ
- Village
- Location within Iran
- Coordinates: 35°25′01″N 58°57′37″E
- Country: Iran
- Province: Razavi Khorasan
- County: Torbat-e Heydarieh
- District: Bayg
- Rural District: Bayg

Population (2016)
  - Total: 269
- Time zone: UTC+3:30 (IRST)

Razg (Persian: رزگ) (Note: Also known as Razak, Razk, Razq, Razzāq, and Razzīq) is a village in Bayg Rural District of Bayg District in Torbat-e Heydarieh County, Razavi Khorasan province, Iran.

== Demographics ==
=== Population ===
At the time of the 2006 National Census, the village's population was 463 in 117 households. The following census in 2011 counted 368 people in 122 households. The 2016 census measured the population of the village as 269 people in 88 households.
