= Kaj Derakht, Fariman =

Kaj Derakht كج درخت
- Village
- Location within Iran
- Coordinates: 35°32′53″N 59°32′41″E
- Country: Iran
- Province: Razavi Khorasan
- County: Fariman
- Bakhsh: Central
- Rural District: Balaband

Population (2006)
  - Total: 48
- Time zone: UTC+3:30 (IRST)
  - Summer (DST): UTC+4:30 (IRDT)

Kaj Derakht (Persian: كج درخت; also known as Kalāteh-ye Kaj Derakht) is a village in Balaband Rural District, in the Central District of Fariman County, Razavi Khorasan Province, Iran. At the 2006 census, its population was 48, in 10 families.
