= Deh-e Pain, Lamerd =

Deh-e Pain ده پائين
- Village
- Location within Iran
- Coordinates: 27°08′04″N 53°49′25″E
- Country: Iran
- Province: Fars
- County: Lamerd
- Bakhsh: Eshkanan
- Rural District: Kal

Population (2006)
  - Total: 128
- Time zone: UTC+3:30 (IRST)
  - Summer (DST): UTC+4:30 (IRDT)

Deh-e Pain (Persian: ده پائين, also Romanized as Deh-e Pā’īn; also known as Pā’īn) is a village in Kal Rural District, Eshkanan District, Lamerd County, Fars province, Iran. At the 2006 census, its population was 128, in 27 families.
