= Cartier Women's Initiative =

Entrepreneurship program

Cartier Women's Initiative is an annual international entrepreneurship program created in 2006 by the French luxury goods maker Cartier (jeweler). The initiative aims to drive change by empowering women impact entrepreneurs. It is open to women led and owned business from any nation and sector that demonstrate a strong, sustainable social or environmental impact.

== History ==
The initiative was established in 2006 through a tripartite collaboration involving Cartier (jeweler), the international management consulting firm McKinsey & Company, and the INSEAD international business school. The program was designed to target discrepancies in international venture capital, where women entrepreneurs encounter substantial barriers in closing early-stage seed round funding.

Over its two decades of operation, the program expanded from its foundational baseline of five regional categories to nine distinct geographic regions. In 2021, the initiative introduced its first thematic categories to incorporate technical innovations outside of regional boundaries. To mark its 2 decade anniversary in 2026, the program relocated its annual awards summit to Bangkok, Thailand, selecting a cohort of 30 global fellows.

== Prize money ==
The funding structure consists of non-dilutive cash grants distributed to the top three finalists across each of the 9 regional categories and 1 thematic award, comprising a total cohort of 30 fellows annually.

Financial rewards are categorized by final placement within each category, amounting to a total of 1.9 million USD.

- First-place awardees: USD 100,000 grant
- Second-place awardees: USD 60,000 grant
- Third-place awardees: USD 30,000 grant

== Notable fellows ==
The initiative has supported over 330 impact entrepreneurs since its inception. Notable fellows and laureates recognized by the program include:

- Ann Kihengu (2010 Africa Laureate) - Tanzanian energy distribution entrepreneur and founder of Pamoja Life, recognized for expanding solar energy and clean cookstove access in rural East Africa.
- Lianna Gunawan (2012 Asia-Pacific Laureate) - Indonesian footwear supply-chain executive and founder of Amanda Niaria, noted for introducing ethical manufacturing and community-based artisan sourcing to commercial footwear.
- Chinwe Ohajuruka (2015 Africa Laureate) - Nigerian green architect and founder of Comprehensive Design Services, specialized in producing affordable, solar-powered, and water-self-sufficient housing models for displaced populations.
- Temie Giwa-Tubosun (2020 Sub-Saharan Africa Fellow) - Nigerian health logistics pioneer and founder of LifeBank, a medical distribution company using tech and cold-chain infrastructure to deliver blood, oxygen, and vaccines to hospitals across Africa.
- Basima Abdulrahman (2021 Middle East & North Africa Laureate) - Iraqi structural engineer and founder of Kesk, recognized for establishing Iraq's first green building and sustainable engineering consultancy to build solar-powered infrastructure.
