= Bakavol, Nishapur =

Bakavol بكاول
- Village
- Location within Iran
- Coordinates: 36°10′55″N 58°47′26″E
- Country: Iran
- Province: Razavi Khorasan
- County: Nishapur
- Bakhsh: Central
- Rural District: Rivand

Population (2006)
  - Total: 463
- Time zone: UTC+3:30 (IRST)
  - Summer (DST): UTC+4:30 (IRDT)

Bakavol (Persian: بكاول, also Romanized as Bakāvol; also known as Bakāvol Va Samandeh) is a village in Rivand Rural District, in the Central District of Nishapur County, Razavi Khorasan Province, Iran. At the 2006 census, its population was 463, in 120 families.

== See also ==
- List of cities, towns and villages in Razavi Khorasan Province
