= Manzar, Bushehr =

Manzar منظر
- Village
- Location within Iran
- Coordinates: 27°50′32″N 52°18′11″E
- Country: Iran
- Province: Bushehr
- County: Jam
- Bakhsh: Central
- Rural District: Jam

Population (2006)
  - Total: 95
- Time zone: UTC+3:30 (IRST)
  - Summer (DST): UTC+4:30 (IRDT)

Manzar (Persian: منظر, also Romanized as Manz̧ar; also known as Kūrī Manz̧ar) is a village in Jam Rural District, in the Central District of Jam County, Bushehr Province, Iran. At the 2006 census, its population was 95, in 16 families.
