= Razg, Birjand =

Razg رزگ
- Village
- Location within Iran
- Coordinates: 32°48′00″N 59°15′32″E
- Country: Iran
- Province: South Khorasan
- County: Birjand
- Bakhsh: Central
- Rural District: Baqeran

Population (2006)
  - Total: 106
- Time zone: UTC+3:30 (IRST)
  - Summer (DST): UTC+4:30 (IRDT)

Razg (Persian: رزگ, also Romanized as Razq; also known as Razg-e Bālā and Razk-e Bālā) is a village in Baqeran Rural District, in the Central District of Birjand County, South Khorasan Province, Iran. At the 2006 census, its population was 106, in 28 families.
