= Raziq Faani =

Afghan poet

Raziq Faani رازق فانی
- Born: 30 December 1943; Kabul, Afghanistan
- Died: 22 April 2007 (aged 63)
- Resting place: San Diego
- Occupations: Poet & Writer
- Website: https://www.raziqfaani.net/

Raziq Faani (Persian: رازق فانی) (30 December 1943 – 22 April 2007) was a renowned Afghan poet and novelist from the city Kabul. He published more than ten volumes of poetry and novels in Persian.

== Work ==
Raziq Faani was one of Afghanistan's most celebrated contemporary poets, whose work is described as mystical, compassionate, and patriotic. His poems describe the suffering of his people through decades of war, destruction, and exile.

== Career and family ==
Ustad Raziq Faani was born in Barana, Kabul-Afghanistan. He received his primary and secondary education in Afghanistan and earned a master's degree in political economy from Sofia, Bulgaria in 1967. His first book of poetry, "Armaghan-e Jawani" was published in 1966. The novel "Baaraana" was published in Kabul in 1983. In 1987, he published a selection of political satire entitled "Ameer e Ba Salaheyat" (Competent director). Ustad Faani left Afghanistan with his family in 1988 for India, where they lived for nearly two years. In 1990 they arrived in the U.S. and made San Diego, California their 2nd home. His books "Payamber e Baraan", "Aber O Aaftaab", "Shikast e Shab", "Dasht Aweena wa Tasweer", "Hazrat e Eishq", and "Partaw e Khorsheed bar Deewar" are all collections of poems such as Ghazal, Nemaiee, Qaseeda, Do Baitee ha all published while he lived away from Afghanistan. Raziq Faani has one son, Jamshade Faani and 3 daughters. Ustad Faani died on 22 April 2007 from cancer at the age of 63.

== Bibliography ==
=== Works by Raziq Faani ===
==== Poetry ====
- ARMAGHAN-E-JAWAANEE (Collection of poems) Kabul Afghanistan 1966.
- PAYAAMBER-E-BAARAN (The Messenger of rain: a selection of poetry). Kabul, Government Printing Press, 1986.
- ABER-WA-AFTAAB (Collection of poems) California 1994.
- SHEKAST-E-SHAB (Collection of poems) California 1997.

==== Prose ====
- BAARAANA (Novel). Kabul, Government Printing Press, 1983.
- AMER-E-BA SALAHEYAT (Competent director: a collection of satire). Writers' Association of Afghanistan, Kabul, Afghanistan 1987.
