= Sarkariz, Kurdistan =

Sarkariz سركاريز
- Village
- Location within Iran
- Coordinates: 34°59′54″N 47°14′23″E
- Country: Iran
- Province: Kurdistan
- County: Kamyaran
- Bakhsh: Muchesh
- Rural District: Sursur

Population (2006)
  - Total: 126
- Time zone: UTC+3:30 (IRST)
  - Summer (DST): UTC+4:30 (IRDT)

Sarkariz (Persian: سركاريز, also Romanized as Sarkārīz; also known as Sarkahrīz) is a village in Sursur Rural District, Muchesh District, Kamyaran County, Kurdistan Province, Iran. At the 2006 census, its population was 126, in 31 families. The village is populated by Kurds.
