= Baba Rud, Hamadan =

Baba Rud بابارود
- Village
- Location within Iran
- Coordinates: 34°33′27″N 48°38′57″E
- Country: Iran
- Province: Hamadan
- County: Malayer
- Bakhsh: Jowkar
- Rural District: Jowkar

Population (2006)
  - Total: 344
- Time zone: UTC+3:30 (IRST)
  - Summer (DST): UTC+4:30 (IRDT)

Baba Rud (Persian: بابارود, also Romanized as Bābā Rūd; also known as Bābāru) is a village in Jowkar Rural District, Jowkar District, Malayer County, Hamadan Province, Iran. At the 2006 census, its population was 344, in 76 families.
