= Razag, Fars =

Razag رزگ
- Village
- Location within Iran
- Coordinates: 28°22′14″N 53°56′11″E
- Country: Iran
- Province: Fars
- County: Jahrom
- Bakhsh: Central
- Rural District: Kuhak

Population (2006)
  - Total: 169
- Time zone: UTC+3:30 (IRST)
  - Summer (DST): UTC+4:30 (IRDT)

Razag (Persian: رزگ; also known as Razak, Rizak, and Zarak) is a village in Kuhak Rural District, in the Central District of Jahrom County, Fars province, Iran. At the 2006 census, its population was 169, in 39 families.
