= Bayg District =

District in Razavi Khorasan province, Iran

Bayg District بخش بایگ
- District
- Location within Iran
- Coordinates: 35°22′N 58°57′E
- Country: Iran
- Province: Razavi Khorasan
- County: Torbat-e Heydarieh
- Capital: Bayg

Population (2016)
  - Total: 6,937
- Time zone: UTC+3:30 (IRST)

Bayg District (Persian: بخش بایگ) (Note: Also known as Bayk District (بخش بايك)) is in Torbat-e Heydarieh County, Razavi Khorasan province, Iran. Its capital is the city of Bayg.

== Demographics ==
=== Population ===
At the time of the 2006 National Census, the district's population was 8,327 in 2,465 households. The following census in 2011 counted 7,161 people in 2,385 households. The 2016 census measured the population of the district as 6,937 inhabitants in 2,424 households.

=== Administrative divisions ===
Bayg District Population
Administrative Divisions	2006	2011	2016
Bayg RD	4,367	3,584	3,392
Bayg (city)	3,960	3,577	3,545
Total	8,327	7,161	6,937
RD = Rural District
