= Pain Velayat Rural District (Torbat-e Heydarieh County) =

Rural district in Razavi Khorasan province, Iran

Pain Velayat Rural District Persian: دهستان پائين ولايت
- Rural District
- Location within Iran
- Coordinates: 35°08′N 59°12′E
- Country: Iran
- Province: Razavi Khorasan
- County: Torbat-e Heydarieh
- District: Central
- Established: 1987
- Capital: Buriabad

Population (2016)
  - Total: 11,932
- Time zone: UTC+3:30 (IRST)

Pain Velayat Rural District (Persian: دهستان پائين ولايت) is in the Central District of Torbat-e Heydarieh County, Razavi Khorasan province, Iran. Its capital is the village of Buriabad.

== Demographics ==
=== Population ===
At the time of the 2006 National Census, the rural district's population was 10,375 in 2,782 households. There were 10,782 inhabitants in 3,244 households at the following census of 2011. The 2016 census measured the population of the rural district as 11,932 in 3,726 households. The most populous of its 62 villages was Federd, with 1,470 people.

=== Other villages in the rural district ===
- Hajji Yar
- Howz-e Sorkh
- Oryan
- Sangalabad
- Seyuki
- Shotor Khosb
- Umi
