= Bala Velayat Rural District (Torbat-e Heydarieh County) =

Rural district in Razavi Khorasan province, Iran

Bala Velayat Rural District Persian: دهستان بالاولايت
- Rural District
- Location within Iran
- Coordinates: 35°23′N 59°11′E
- Country: Iran
- Province: Razavi Khorasan
- County: Torbat-e Heydarieh
- District: Central
- Established: 1987

Population (2016)
  - Total: 27,133
- Time zone: UTC+3:30 (IRST)

Bala Velayat Rural District (Persian: دهستان بالاولايت) is in the Central District of Torbat-e Heydarieh County, Razavi Khorasan province, Iran.

== Demographics ==
=== Population ===
At the time of the 2006 National Census, the rural district's population was 20,908 in 5,698 households. There were 24,381 inhabitants in 6,916 households at the following census of 2011. The 2016 census measured the population of the rural district as 27,133 in 7,978 households. The most populous of its 41 villages was Manzar, with 3,111 people.

=== Other villages in the rural district ===
- Abrud
- Aghuyeh
- Asfiukh
- Deh-e Pain
- Ferezq
- Karizak-e Khujui
- Nughab
- Senowbar
- Sowmeeh
- Zia ol Din-e Olya
