= Central District (Torbat-e Heydarieh County) =

District in Razavi Khorasan province, Iran

Central District (Torbat-e Heydarieh County) Persian: بخش مرکزی شهرستان تربت حیدریه
- District
- Location within Iran
- Coordinates: 35°15′N 59°11′E
- Country: Iran
- Province: Razavi Khorasan
- County: Torbat-e Heydarieh
- Capital: Torbat-e Heydarieh

Population (2016)
  - Total: 179,084
- Time zone: UTC+3:30 (IRST)

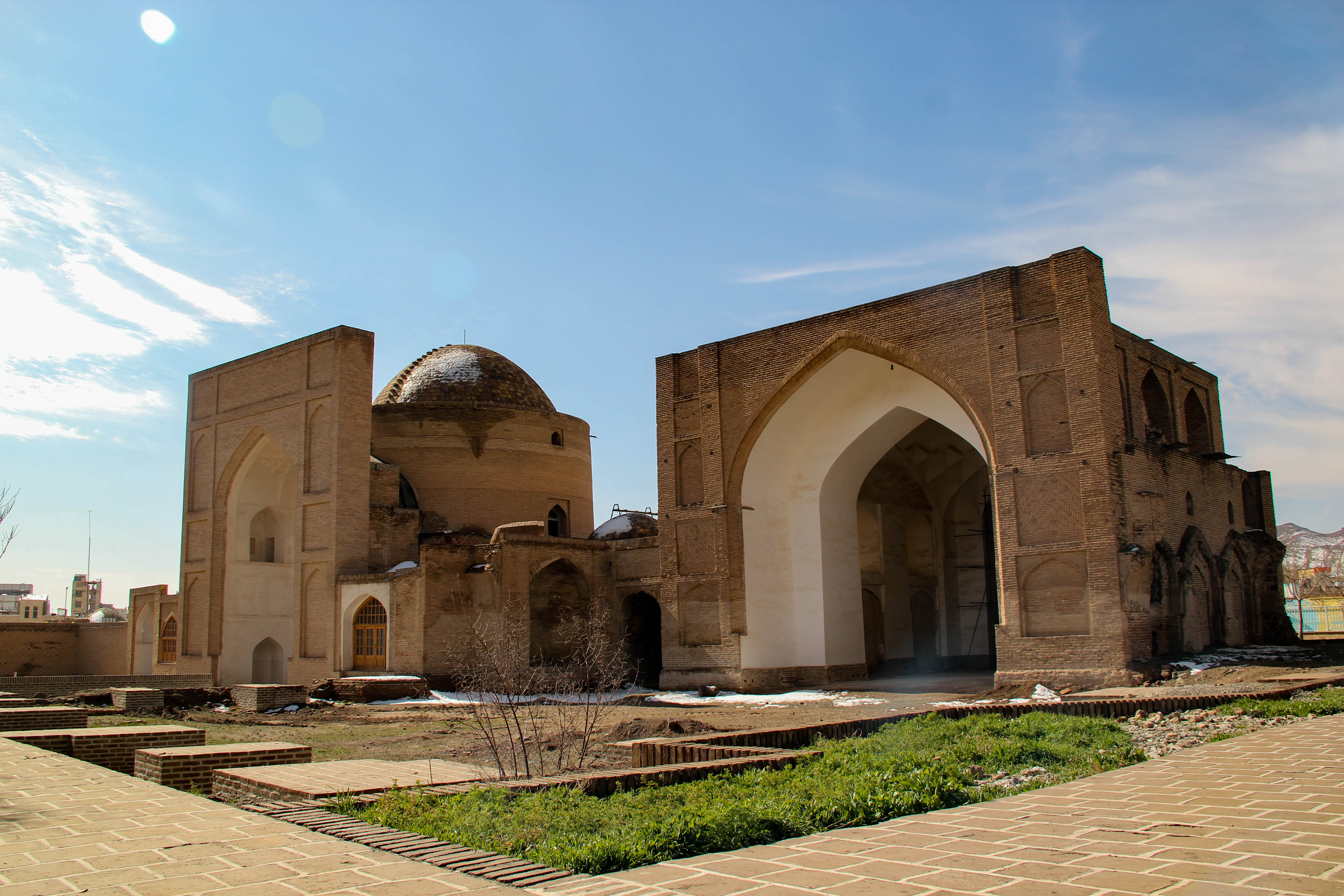
Mausoleum of Qutb ad-Din Haydar, Central District, Razavi Khorasan province, Iran

The Central District of Torbat-e Heydarieh County (Persian: بخش مرکزی شهرستان تربت حیدریه) is in Razavi Khorasan province, Iran. Its capital is the city of Torbat-e Heydarieh.

== Demographics ==
=== Population ===
At the time of the 2006 National Census, the district's population was 150,643 in 40,349 households. The following census in 2011 counted 166,313 people in 47,967 households. The 2016 census measured the population of the district as 179,084 inhabitants in 54,733 households.

=== Administrative divisions ===
Central District (Torbat-e Heydarieh County) Population
Administrative Divisions	2006	2011	2016
Bala Velayat RD	20,908	24,381	27,133
Pain Velayat RD	10,375	10,782	11,932
Torbat-e Heydarieh (city)	119,360	131,150	140,019
Total	150,643	166,313	179,084
RD = Rural District
