= Torbat-e Heydarieh County =

County in Razavi Khorasan province, Iran

Torbat-e Heydarieh County Persian: شهرستان تربت حیدریه
- County
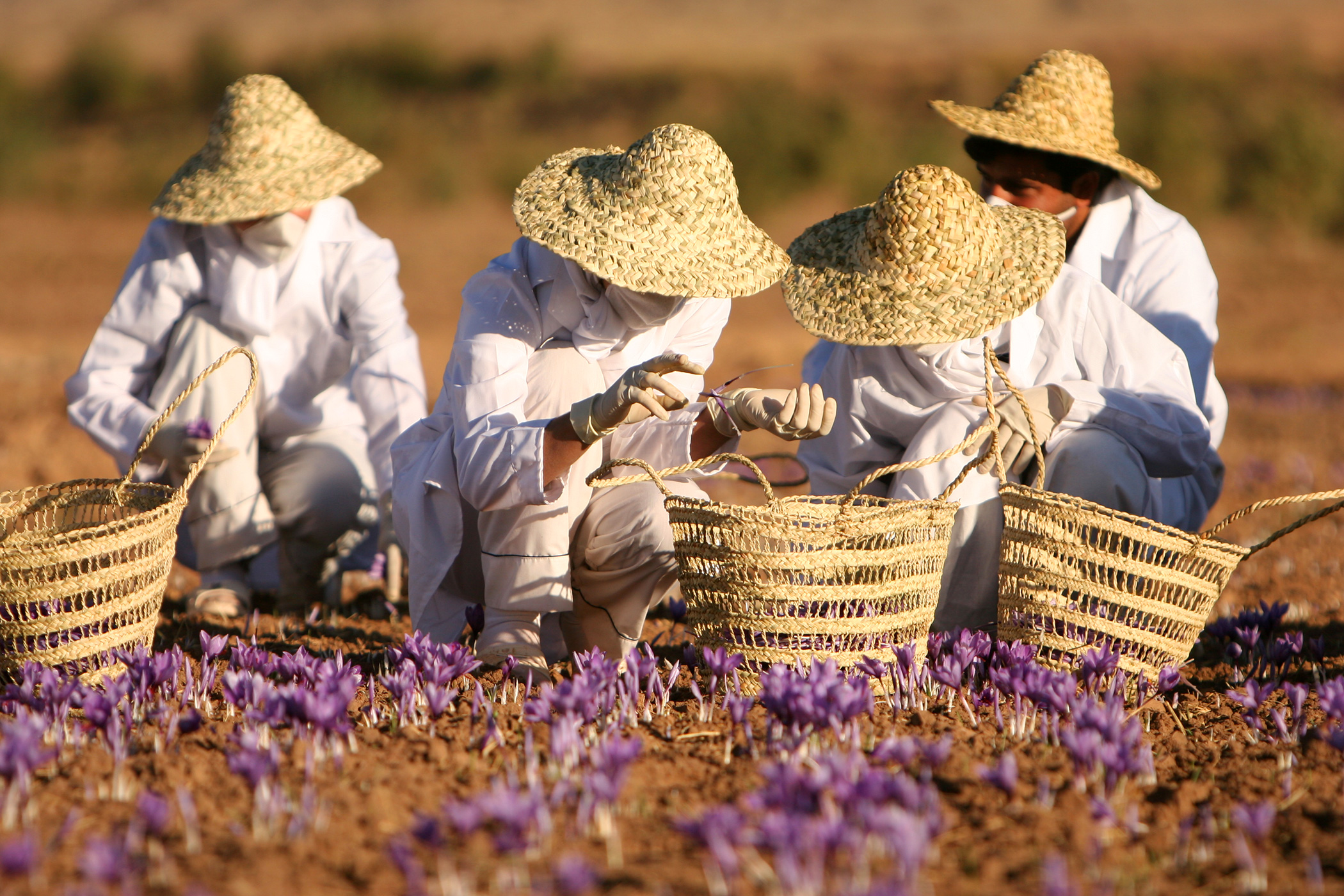
- Harvesting saffron, the main agricultural product of this county

- Location of Torbat-e Heydarieh County in Razavi Khorasan province (center, pink)

- Location of Razavi Khorasan province in Iran
- Coordinates: 35°25′N 59°09′E
- Country: Iran
- Province: Razavi Khorasan
- Capital: Torbat-e Heydarieh
- Districts: Central, Bayg, Jolgeh Rokh, Kadkan

Area
  - Total: 3,681 km^{2} (1,421 sq mi)

Population (2016)
  - Total: 224,626
  - Density: 61.02/km^{2} (158.0/sq mi)
- Time zone: UTC+3:30 (IRST)

Torbat-e Heydarieh County (Persian: شهرستان تربت حیدریه) (Note: Also romanized as Šahrestâne Torbate Heydarie) is in Razavi Khorasan province, Iran. Its capital is the city of Torbat-e Heydarieh.

== History ==
In 2008, Jolgeh Zaveh District was separated from the county in the establishment of Zaveh County. The village of Nasar was converted to a city in 2021.

== Demographics ==
=== Population ===
At the time of the 2006 National Census, the county's population was 261,917, in 67,735 households. The following census in 2011 counted 210,390 people in 60,777 households. The 2016 census measured the population of the county as 224,626 in 68,927 households.

=== Administrative divisions ===
Torbat-e Heydarieh County's population history and administrative structure over three consecutive censuses are shown in the following table.

Torbat-e Heydarieh County Population
Administrative Divisions	2006	2011	2016
Central District	150,643	166,313	179,084
Bala Velayat RD	20,908	24,381	27,133
Pain Velayat RD	10,375	10,782	11,932
Torbat-e Heydarieh (city)	119,360	131,150	140,019
Bayg District	8,327	7,161	6,937
Bayg RD	4,367	3,584	3,392
Bayg (city)	3,960	3,577	3,545
Jolgeh Rokh District	24,886	24,705	25,748
Bala Rokh RD	7,483	7,565	7,825
Miyan Rokh RD	5,903	6,162	5,686
Pain Rokh RD	10,156	9,257	10,686
Nasar (city) (Note: Became a city after the 2016 census)			
Robat-e Sang (city)	1,344	1,721	1,551
Jolgeh Zaveh District (Note: Transferred to Zaveh County)	66,206		
Safaiyeh RD	12,711		
Soleyman RD	27,332		
Zaveh RD	17,423		
Dowlatabad (city)	8,740		
Kadkan District	11,855	12,031	12,805
Kadkan RD	5,107	5,147	5,941
Roqicheh RD	3,582	3,096	3,145
Kadkan (city)	3,166	3,788	3,719
Total	261,917	210,390	224,626
RD = Rural District

== Geography ==
Torbat-e Heydarieh County is 1005 km away from Tehran, and in a mountainous region on the skirt of mountains having different weather in different areas. In the past, this city was called Zaveh. According to a narrative in the 13th century, Sheikh Haydar, a famous Gnostic, lived there. The change of its name from Zaveh to Torbat-e Heydarieh is related to the life and tomb of this great Gnostic. The existing cultural heritage belongs to Sasanian times and the 13th century: Bazeh Hovar and Robat Sefid temple, Ghotb-e-dinn Haydar, Sheikh Haydar, Sheikh Abolghasema, and Shoh Senjan tombs.

== See also ==
Media related to Torbat-e Heydarieh County at Wikimedia Commons
