= Ramona Street Architectural District =

Historic district in California, United States

- U.S. National Register of Historic Places
- U.S. Historic district
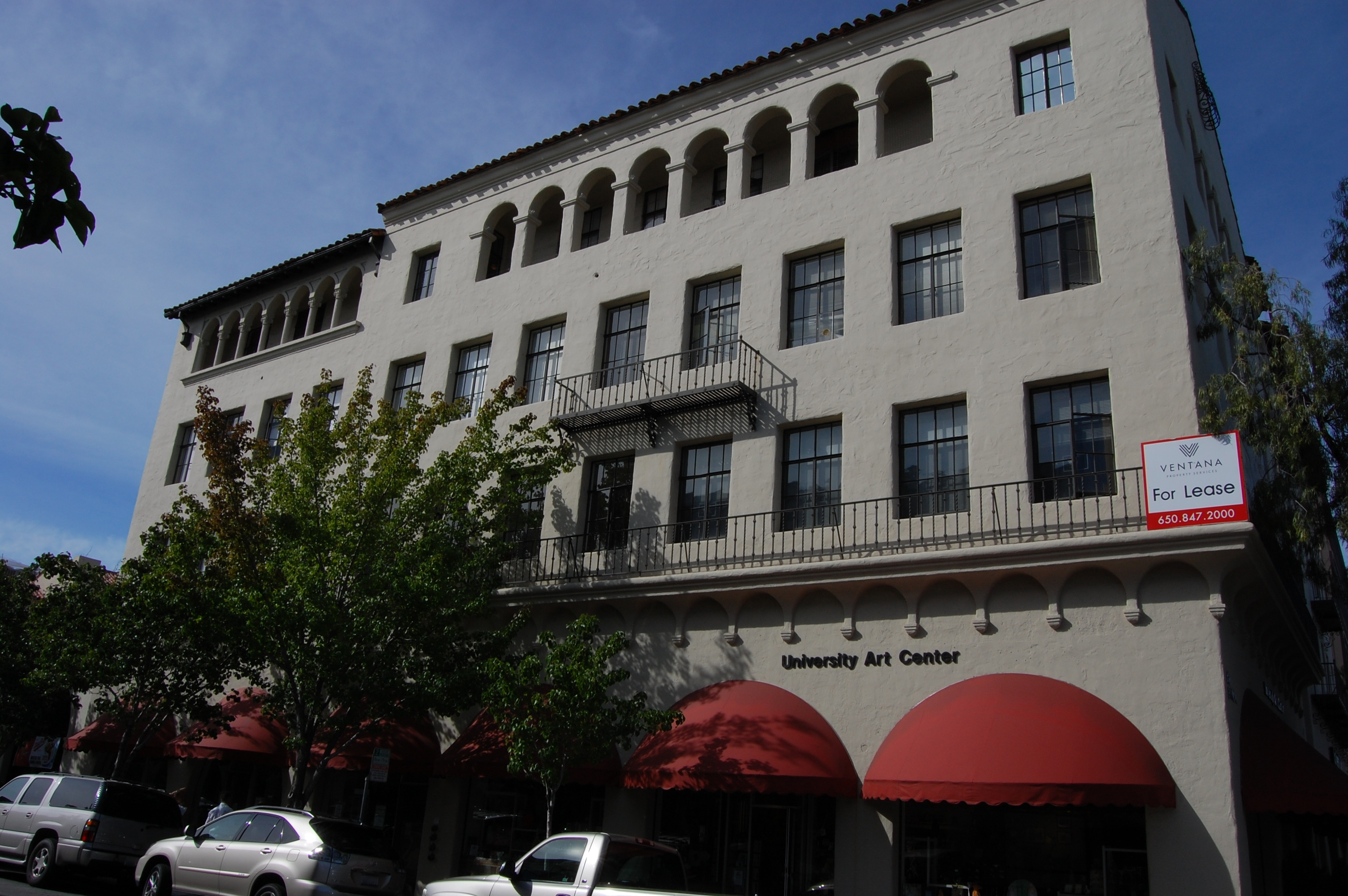

- Location within California Location within the United States
- Location: Palo Alto, California
- Coordinates: 37°26′43.1″N 122°9′43.95″W
- NRHP reference No.: 86000592
- Added to NRHP: March 27, 1986

The Ramona Street Architectural District, in downtown Palo Alto, California, is a Registered Historic District. This portion of the street, between University Avenue and Hamilton Avenue, is a highly distinctive business block. It showcases the Spanish Colonial and Early California styles with gentle archways, wrought iron work, tile roofs of varying heights and courtyards.

== History ==
The development of Ramona Street, named after the 1884 novel Ramona, was an early successful attempt to expand laterally the central commercial district. Pedro Joseph de Lemos, a craftsman, graphic artist and curator of the Stanford Museum had been concerned with the larger scale and somewhat linear development along University Avenue. He believed that an informal architecture full of whimsy and integrated with nature was indeed compatible with commercial businesses.

The first building to go up, in 1925, was the Gotham Shop at 520 Ramona, built by de Lemos, who had bought the property to preserve a very old oak tree (finally removed in the 1980s). He designed the building around the venerable oak and created shops with rustic benches, ceramic tiles and stucco walls. In 1938, de Lemos built another Spanish Colonial Revival commercial office building across the street at 533 - 539 Ramona, with a recessed arched entrance, an interior patio, wrought iron and more tiles.

Noted local architects Birge Clark, W. H. Weeks and others added to the Spanish flavor of what de Lemos started. In 1928, Clark designed the multistory Medico-Dental Building at Hamilton and Ramona, which now houses the University Art Center on the ground floor. Across Ramona, Weeks designed the Cardinal Hotel, Palo Alto's first non-frame hotel. Excitement attended the Cardinal's debut, for it became the scene of tea dances and balls. The hotel had another purpose; it was intended to help make Hamilton a commercial street.

The unified aspect of the 500 Ramona Street block was recognized by its designation in 1985 as a Historic District in the National Register of Historic Places. Since then, Plaza Ramona and other remodelings at the University Avenue end of the block have enhanced the theme.

== See also ==
- Professorville
