= Palo Alto, California =

- City
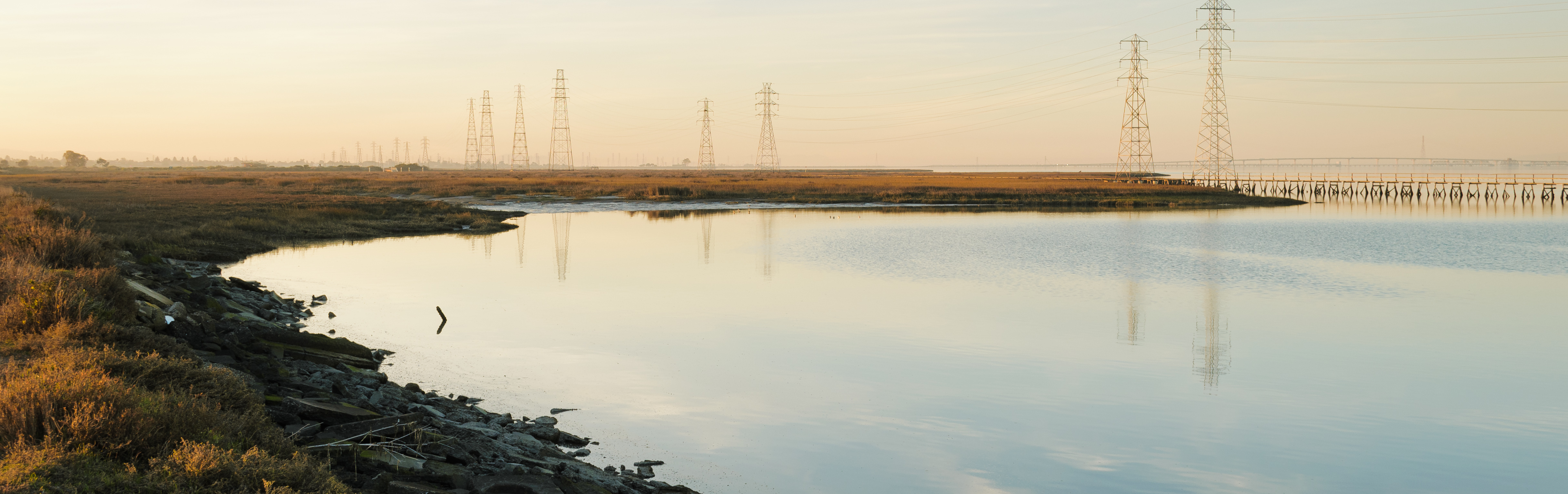
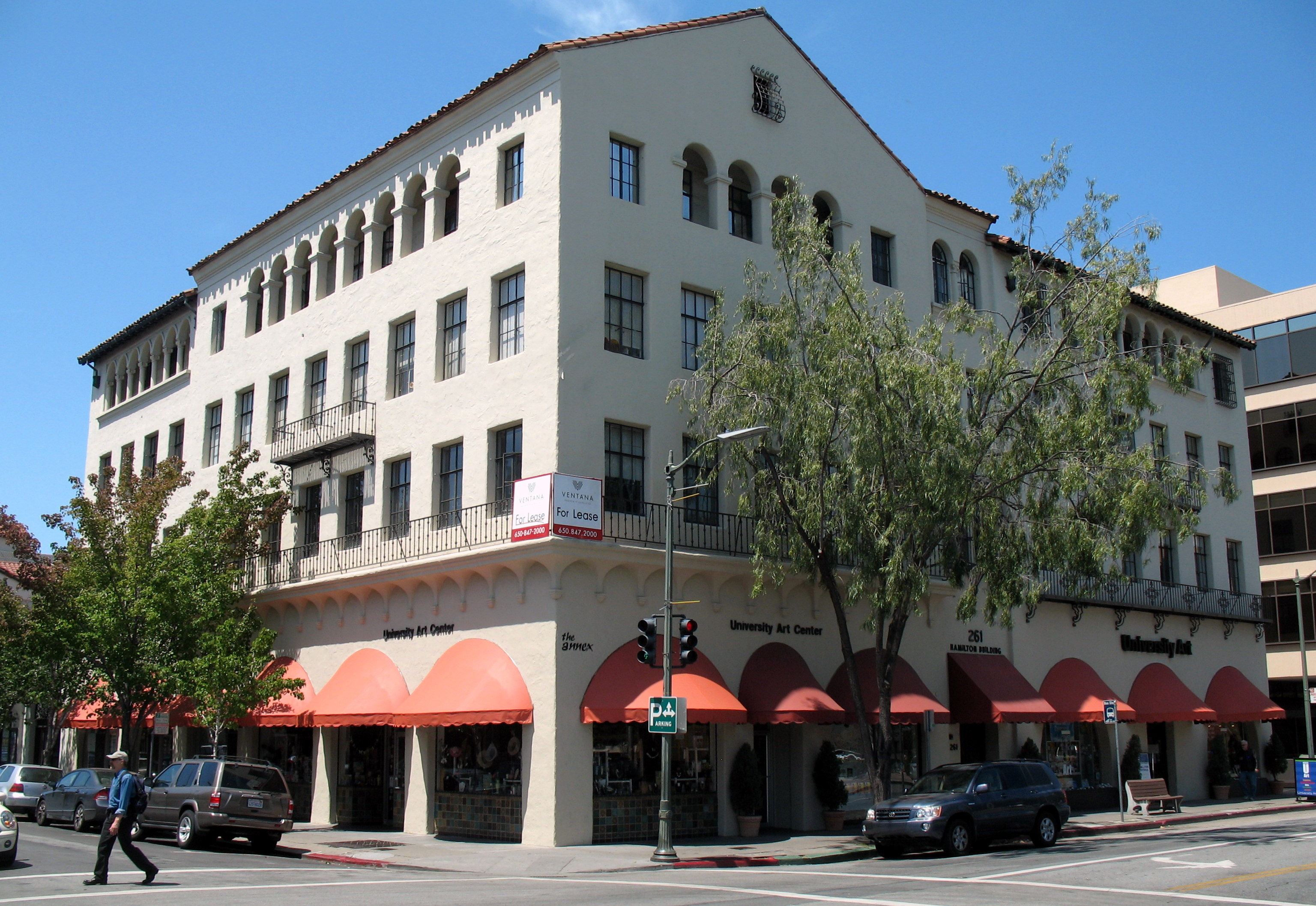
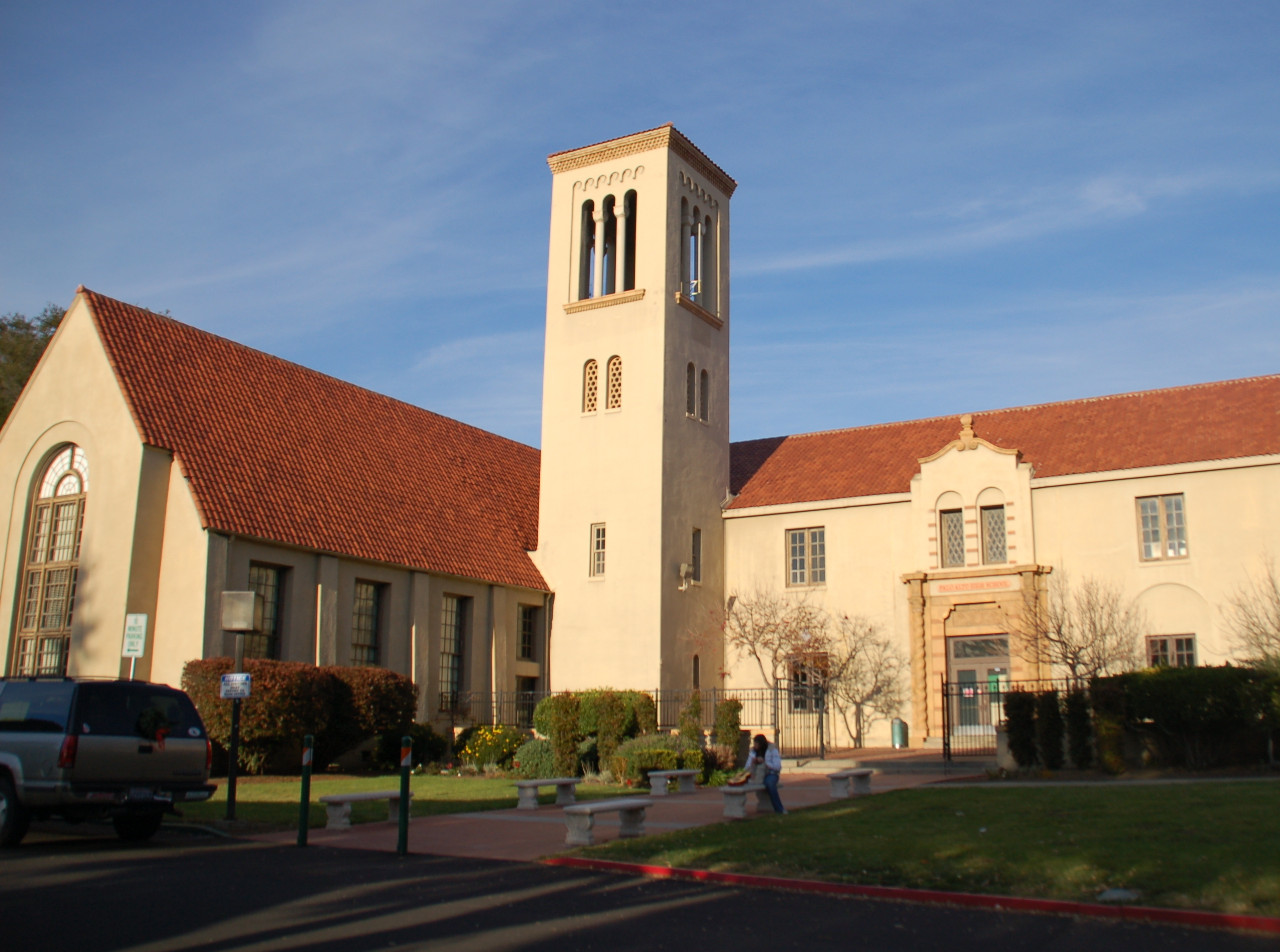
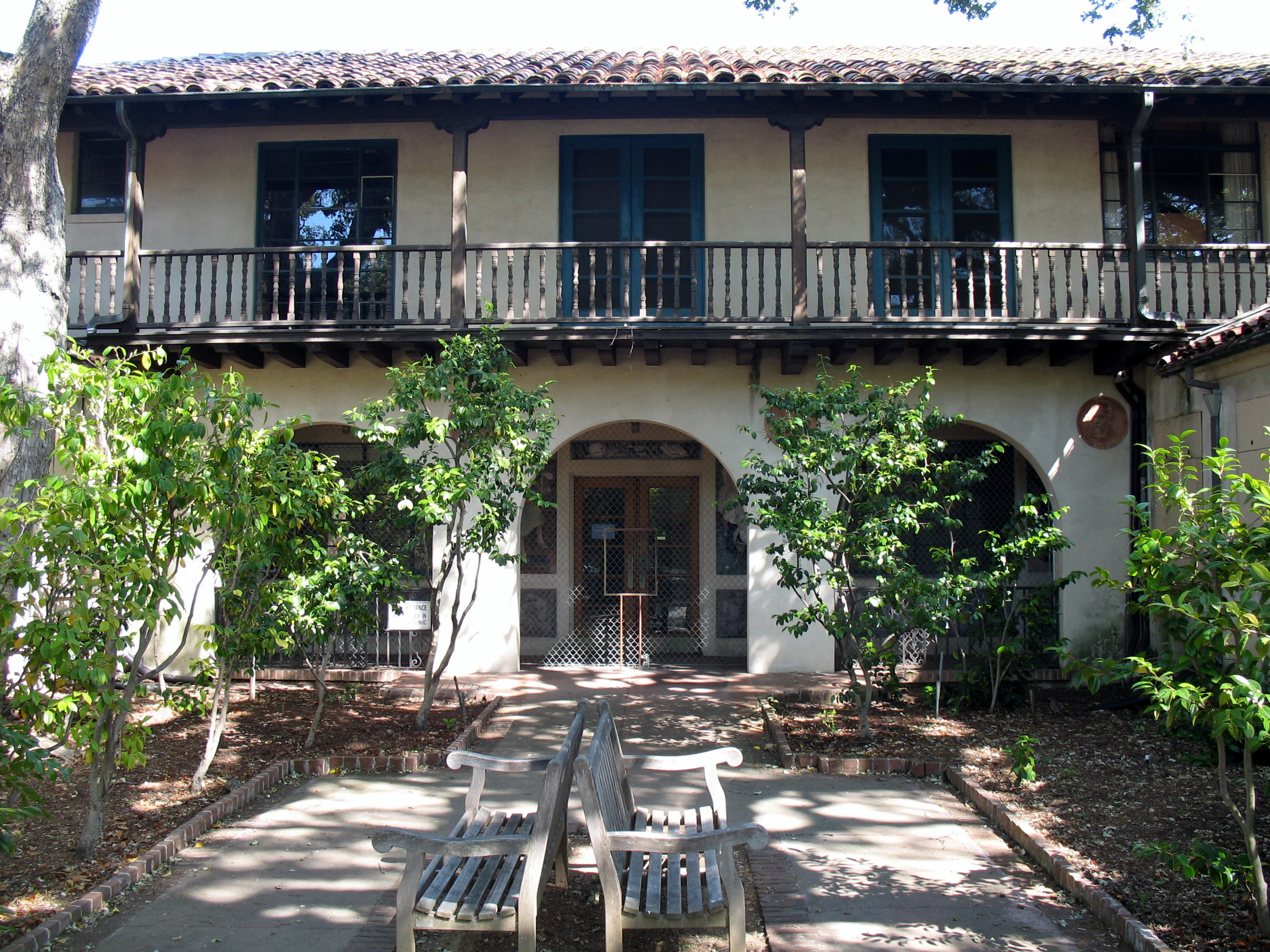
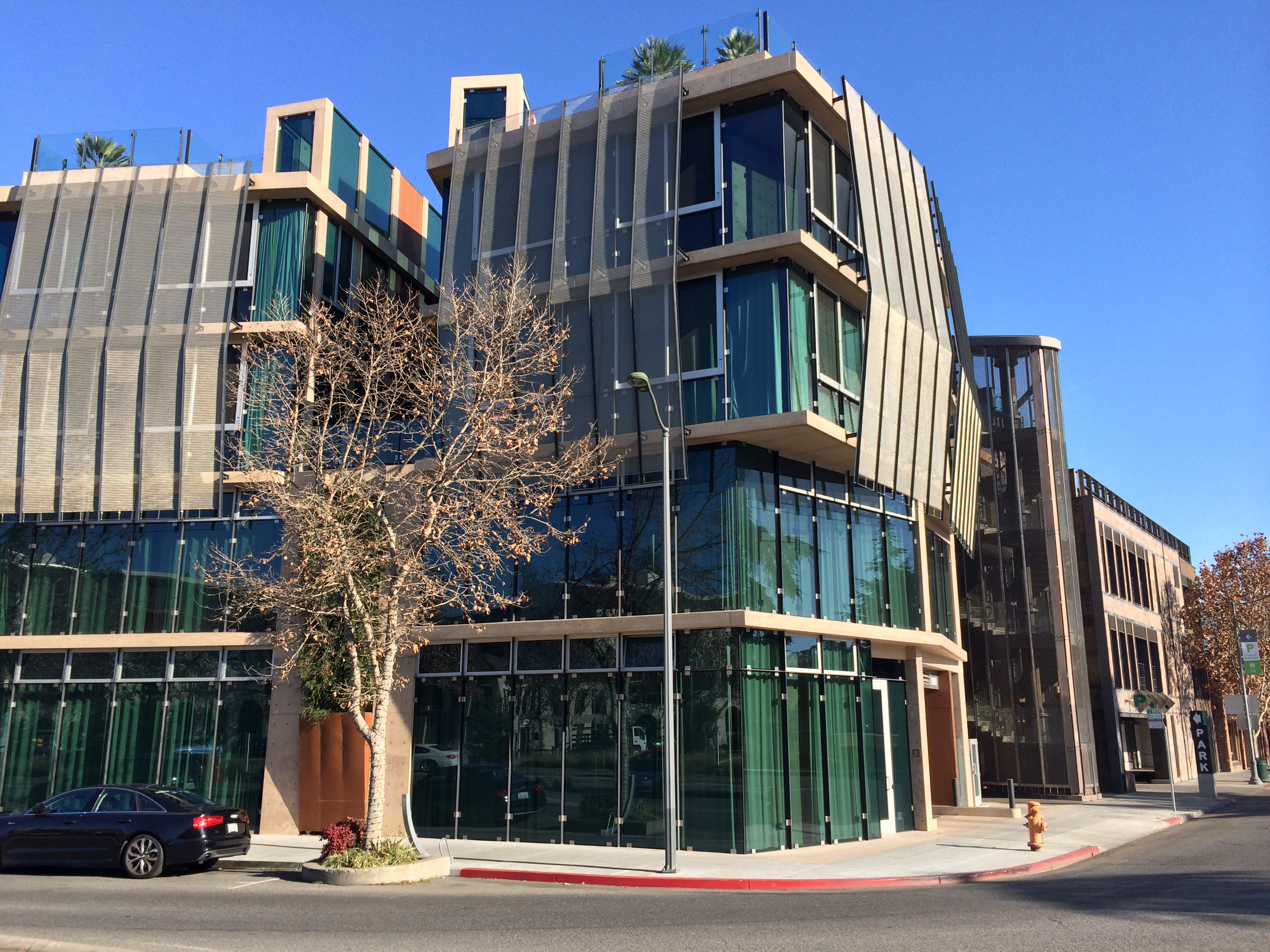
- Baylands Nature Preserve Ramona Street Architectural District Palo Alto High School Palo Alto History Museum Palo Alto Circle

- Flag Seal Logo
- Etymology: from Spanish palo alto 'tall stick'
- Interactive map of Palo Alto, California
- Location within San Francisco Bay Area Location within California Location within the United States
- Coordinates: 37°26′40″N 122°9′36″W
- Country: United States
- State: California
- County: Santa Clara
- Incorporated: April 16, 1894
- Named for: El Palo Alto

Government
  - Type: Council-Manager
  - Body: City council members: Mayor Vicki Veenker; Vice Mayor Greer Stone; Pat Burt; George Lu; Julie Lythcott-Haims; Keith Reckdahl; Ed Lauing
  - Mayor: Vicki Veenker

Area
  - Total: 26.00 sq mi (67.35 km^{2})
  - Land: 24.10 sq mi (62.41 km^{2})
  - Water: 1.91 sq mi (4.94 km^{2}) 7.38%
- Elevation: 30 ft (9 m)

Population (2020)
  - Total: 68,572
  - Density: 2,712.6/sq mi (1,047.35/km^{2})
- Demonym: Palo Altan
- Time zone: UTC−8 (Pacific)
  - Summer (DST): UTC−7 (PDT)
- ZIP Codes: 94301-94306 & 94309
- Area code: 650
- FIPS code: 06-55282
- Website: www.paloalto.gov

Palo Alto (/ˌpæloʊ ˈæltoʊ/ PAL-oh AL-toh; Spanish for 'tall stick') is a charter city in northwestern Santa Clara County, California, United States. Part of the San Francisco Bay Area, it is named after a coastal redwood tree known as El Palo Alto. The population was 68,572 as of the 2020 United States census.

Palo Alto was incorporated in 1894 by the American industrialist Leland Stanford and his wife, Jane Stanford, when they founded Stanford University in memory of their only child, Leland Stanford Jr. The city later expanded and now borders East Palo Alto, Mountain View, Los Altos, Los Altos Hills, Stanford, Portola Valley, and Menlo Park. Palo Alto has one of the highest costs of living in the United States, and its residents are among the most educated in the country. However, it has a youth suicide rate four times higher than the national average, often attributed to academic pressure.

As one of the principal cities of Silicon Valley, Palo Alto is home to the headquarters of multiple tech companies, including HP, Space Systems/Loral, VMware, and PARC. Palo Alto has also served as headquarters or the founding location of several other tech companies, including Apple, Google, Meta, Logitech, Tesla, Intuit, IDEO, Pinterest, 23andMe, and PayPal. Ford Motor Company and Lockheed Martin each additionally maintain major research and technology facilities within Palo Alto.

== History ==
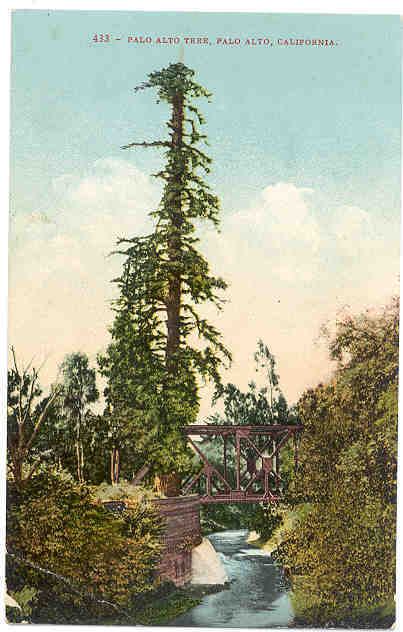
Palo Alto is named after El Palo Alto, a historic 110 ft-tall (34 m) California Redwood on the banks of the San Francisquito Creek, sighted and named by the Portolá expedition in 1769.

Before the arrival of Europeans, the Ohlone lived on the San Francisco peninsula; in particular, the Puichon Ohlone lived in the Palo Alto area. The area of modern Palo Alto was first recorded by the 1769 party of Gaspar de Portolá, a 64-man, 200-horse expedition setting out from San Diego to find Monterey Bay. The group trekked past the bay without recognizing it and continued north. When they reached modern-day Pacifica, they ascended Sweeney Ridge and saw the San Francisco Bay on November 2. Portolá descended from Sweeney Ridge southeast down San Andreas Creek to Laguna Creek (now Crystal Springs Reservoir), thence to the San Francisquito Creek watershed, ultimately camping from November 6–11, 1769, by a tall redwood later to be known as El Palo Alto.

In 1777, Father Junípero Serra established the Mission Santa Clara de Asís, whose northern boundary was San Francisquito Creek and whose lands included modern Palo Alto. The area was under the control of the viceroy of Mexico and ultimately under the control of Spain. On November 29, 1777, Pueblo de San Jose de Guadalupe (now the city of San Jose a few miles to the south of what was to be Palo Alto) was established by order of the viceroy despite the displeasure of the local mission. The Mexican War of Independence ending in 1821 led to Mexico becoming an independent country, though San Jose did not recognize rule by the new Mexico until May 10, 1825. Mexico proceeded to sell off or grant much of the mission land.

During the Mexican–American War, the United States seized Alta California in 1846; its acquisition was formally recognized under the Treaty of Guadalupe Hidalgo, signed on February 2, 1848. Mexican citizens in the ceded territory could choose to become United States citizens, and their land grants were to be honored, although many later became the subject of legal disputes.

The land grant, Rancho Rinconada del Arroyo de San Francisquito, of about 2,230 acres (9.0 km^{2}) on the lower reaches of San Francisquito Creek (i.e., parts of modern Menlo Park and northern Palo Alto) was given to Maria Antonia Mesa in 1841. She and her husband Rafael Soto (who had died in 1839) had settled in 1835 near present-day Newell and Middlefield roads and sold supplies. In 1839, their daughter María Luisa Soto (1817–1883) married John Coppinger, who was to be, in 1841, the grantee of Rancho Cañada de Raymundo (in modern San Mateo county). Upon Coppinger's death in 1847, Maria inherited it and later married a visiting boat captain, John Greer. Greer owned a home on the site that is now Town & Country Village on Embarcadero and El Camino Real. Greer Avenue and Court are named for him.

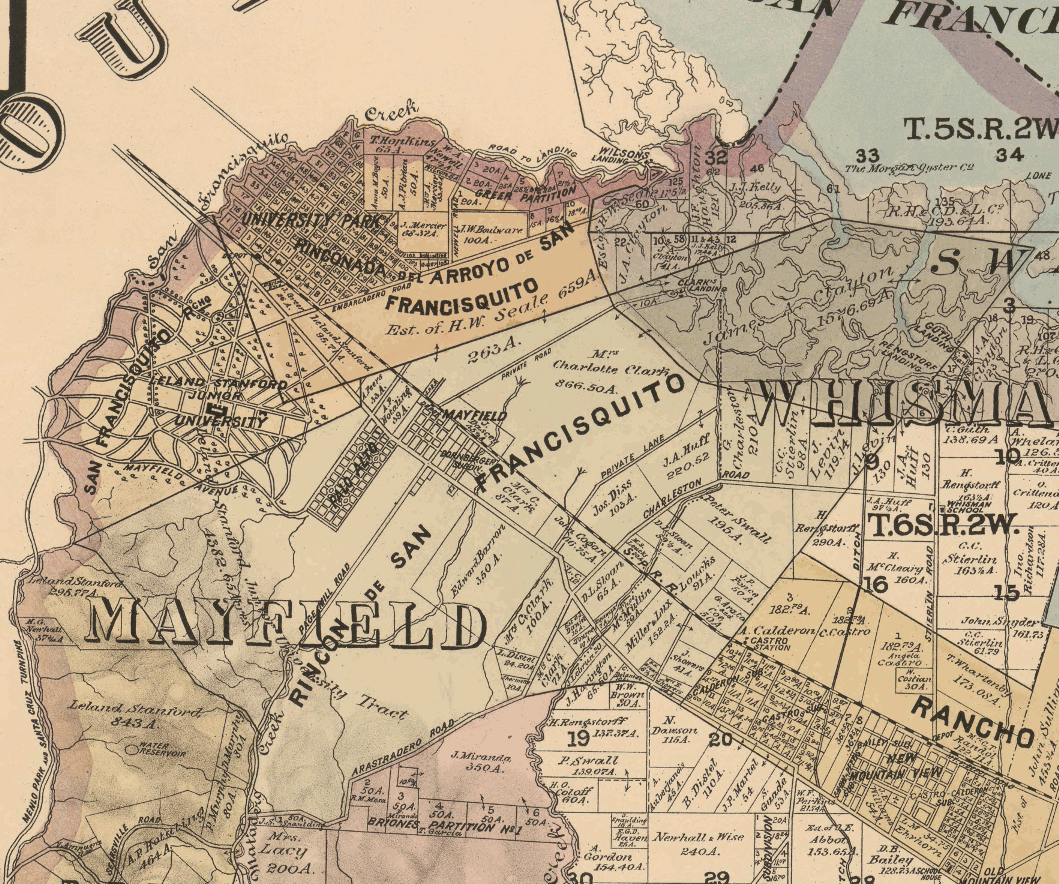
Part of an 1890 map of northern Santa Clara County including all or part of the towns of University Park, Palo Alto (now College Terrace in Palo Alto), Mayfield. Also shows Stanford University (still under construction at the time.)

To the south of the Sotos, the brothers Secundino and Teodoro Robles in 1849 bought Rancho Rincon de San Francisquito from José Peña, the 1841 grantee. The grant covered the area south of Rancho Rinconada del Arroyo de San Francisquito to more or less present-day Mountain View. The grant was bounded on the south by Mariano Castro's Rancho Pastoria de las Borregas grant across San Antonio Road. This later became the Robles Rancho, which constitutes about 80% of Palo Alto and Stanford University today. In 1863, it was whittled down in the courts to 6,981 acres (28.25 km^{2}). Stories say the grand hacienda was built on the former meager adobe of José Peña near Ferne off San Antonio Road, midway between Middlefield and Alma Street. Their hacienda hosted fiestas and bull fights. It was ruined in the 1906 earthquake and its lumber was used to build a large barn nearby, which was said to have lingered until the early 1950s. On April 10, 1853, 250 acres (1.0 km^{2}), the present-day Barron Park, Matadero Creek and Stanford Business Park, was sold for $2,000 to Elisha Oscar Crosby, who called his new property Mayfield Farm. The name of Mayfield was later attached to the community that started nearby. On September 23, 1856, the Crosby land was transferred to Sarah Wallis to satisfy a debt he owed her. In 1880, Secundino Robles, father to twenty-nine children, still lived just south of Palo Alto, near the location of the present-day San Antonio Shopping Center in Mountain View.

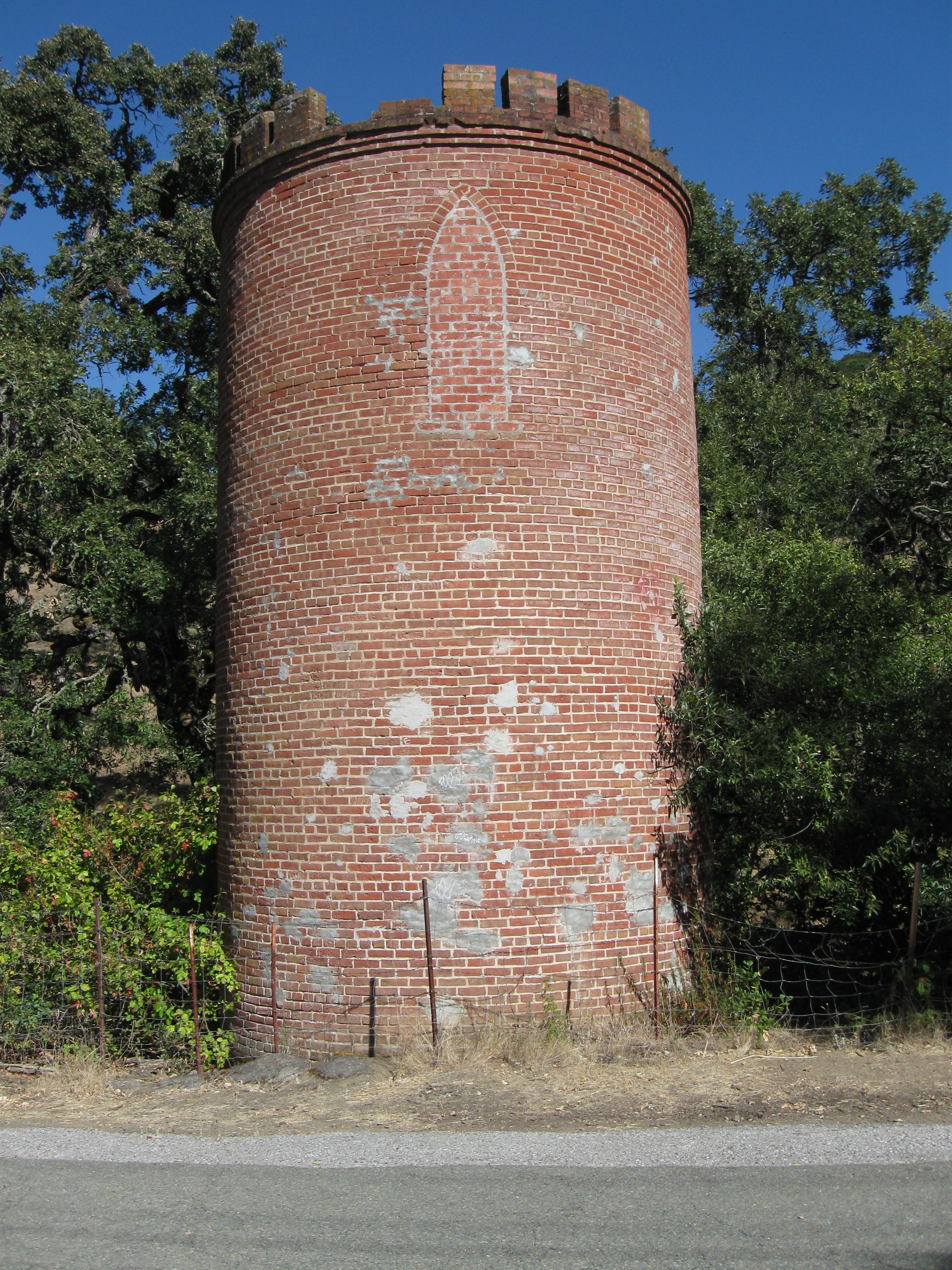
Frenchman's Tower was built in 1875 by Peter Coutts. This 50-foot-tall (15 m) brick tower near Matadero Creek likely marked the south corner of his property.

Many of the Spanish names in the Palo Alto area represent the local heritage, descriptive terms, and former residents. Pena Court, Miranda Avenue, which was essentially Foothill Expressway, was the married name of Juana Briones and the name occurs in Courts and Avenues and other street names in Palo Alto and Mountain View in the quadrant where she owned vast areas between Stanford University, Grant Road in Mountain View and west of El Camino Real, as well as a public park. Yerba Buena was to her credit. Rinconada was the major Mexican land grant name.

The township of Mayfield was formed in 1855, around the site of a stagecoach stop and saloon known as "Uncle Jim's Cabin" near the intersection of El Camino Real and today's California Avenue in what is now southern Palo Alto. In October 1863 the San Francisco to San Jose railroad had been built as far as Mayfield and service started between San Francisco and Mayfield (the station is now California Avenue); train service all the way to San Jose started in January 1864. El Camino became Main Street; the northeast–southwest cross streets were named for Civil War heroes, with California Avenue originally being Lincoln Street. The town had its own newspaper by 1869 (the Mayfield Enterprise, in English and Spanish), incorporated in 1903, and had breweries and a cannery.

In 1875, French financier Jean Baptiste Paulin Caperon, better known as Peter Coutts, purchased land in Mayfield and four other parcels around three sides of today's College Terrace – more than a thousand acres (4.0 km^{2}) extending from today's Page Mill Road to Serra Street and from El Camino Real to the foothills. Coutts named his property Ayrshire Farm. Leland Stanford started buying land in the area in 1876 for a horse farm, called the Palo Alto Stock Farm. Stanford bought Ayrshire Farm in 1882.

=== Creation of the town ===
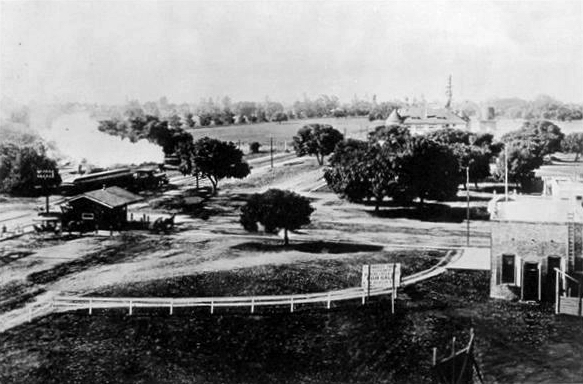
University Avenue at the Circle with train steaming toward El Palo Alto, 1894

In 1884, Leland and Jane Stanford lost their only child Leland Stanford Jr. when he died of typhoid fever at 15 years old and decided to create a university in his memory. In 1886, they proposed having the university's gateway be Mayfield. However, they had one condition: alcohol had to be banned from the town. Known for its 13 rowdy saloons, Mayfield rejected his request. This led them to drive the formation of a new temperance town with the help of their friend Timothy Hopkins of the Southern Pacific Railroad, who in 1887 bought 740 acres (3.0 km^{2}) of private land for the new townsite. This Hopkins Tract, bounded by El Camino Real, San Francisquito Creek, Boyce, Channing, Melville, and Hopkins Avenues, and Embarcadero Road, was proclaimed a local Heritage District during Palo Alto's centennial in 1994. The Stanfords set up their university, Stanford University, and a train stop (on University Avenue) by the new town. This new community was initially called University Park (the name "Palo Alto" at that time was attached to what is now College Terrace), but was incorporated on April 16, 1894, with the name Palo Alto. With the Stanfords' support, Palo Alto grew to the size of Mayfield. Mayfield eventually passed an ordinance banning saloons that took effect in January 1905.

=== Later history ===
On July 2, 1925, Palo Alto voters approved the annexation of Mayfield and the two communities were officially consolidated on July 6, 1925. As a result, Palo Alto has two Caltrain stops and two downtown areas: one along University Avenue and one along California Avenue (renamed after the annexation since Palo Alto already had a Lincoln Avenue).

The Mayfield News wrote its own obituary four days later:

It is with a feeling of deep regret that we see on our streets today those who would sell, or give, our beautiful little city to an outside community. We have watched Mayfield grow from a small hamlet, when Palo Alto was nothing more than a hayfield, to her present size ... and it is with a feeling of sorrow that we contemplate the fact that there are those who would sell or give the city away.

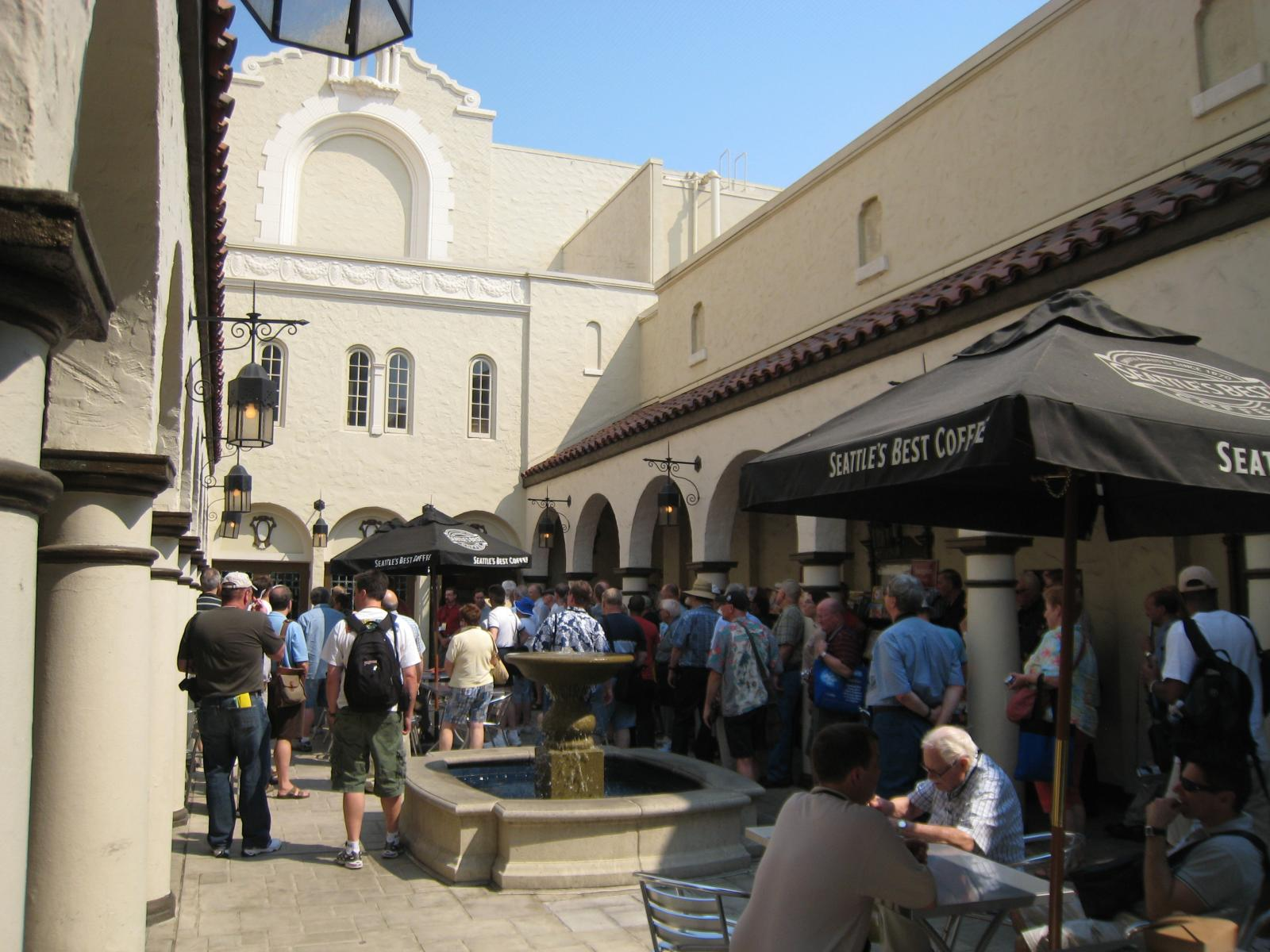
The historic Varsity Theatre, built in 1927 in a Mission Revival style

Palo Alto continued to annex more land, including the Stanford Shopping Center area in 1953. Stanford Research Park, Embarcadero Road northeast of Bayshore, and the West Bayshore/San Antonio Road area were also annexed during the 1950s. Large amounts of land west of Foothill Expressway were annexed between 1959 and 1968; this is mostly undeveloped and includes Foothills Park and Arastradero Preserve. The last major annexations were of Barron Park in 1975 and, in 1979, a large area of marshlands bordering the bay.

Many of Stanford University's first faculty members settled in the Professorville neighborhood of Palo Alto. Professorville, now a registered national historic district, is bounded by Kingsley, Lincoln, and Addison Avenues and the cross streets of Ramona, Bryant, and Waverley. The district includes a large number of well-preserved residences dating from the 1890s, including 833 Kingsley, 345 Lincoln, and 450 Kingsley. 1044 Bryant was the home of Russell Varian, co-inventor of the Klystron tube. The Federal Telegraph laboratory site, situated at 218 Channing, is a California Historical Landmark recognizing Lee de Forest's 1911 invention of the vacuum tube and electronic oscillator at that location. While not open to the public, the garage that housed the launch of Hewlett Packard is located at 367 Addison Avenue. Hewlett Packard recently restored the house and garage. A second historic district on Ramona Street can be found downtown between University and Hamilton Avenues. Established in 1963, the Palo Alto Chinese School is the San Francisco Bay Area's oldest Chinese school. It is also home to the second oldest opera company in California, the West Bay Opera.

One early major business was when Thomas Foon Chew, owner of the Bayside Canning Company in Alviso founded by his father, expanded his business by starting a cannery in 1918 in what was then Mayfield that initially employed 350 workers but later expanded. In the 1920s the Bayside Canning Company became one of the largest in the world. In 1949 the Palo Alto cannery, now part of the Sutter Packing Company under the ownership of Safeway, closed; at the time it was the largest employer in Palo Alto with about 1,000 workers. Various businesses used the building since including Fry's Electronics.

Palo Alto is also home to a long-standing baseball tradition. The Palo Alto Oaks are a collegiate summer baseball club that has been in the Bay Area since 1950, eight years longer than the San Francisco Giants. The Oaks were originally managed by Tony Makjavich for 49 years. The Oaks were going to fold before the summer 2016 season but were taken on by Daniel Palladino and Whaylan Price, Bay Area baseball coaches who did not want to see the team die. The Oaks have a rich history within the Palo Alto community.

== Geography ==
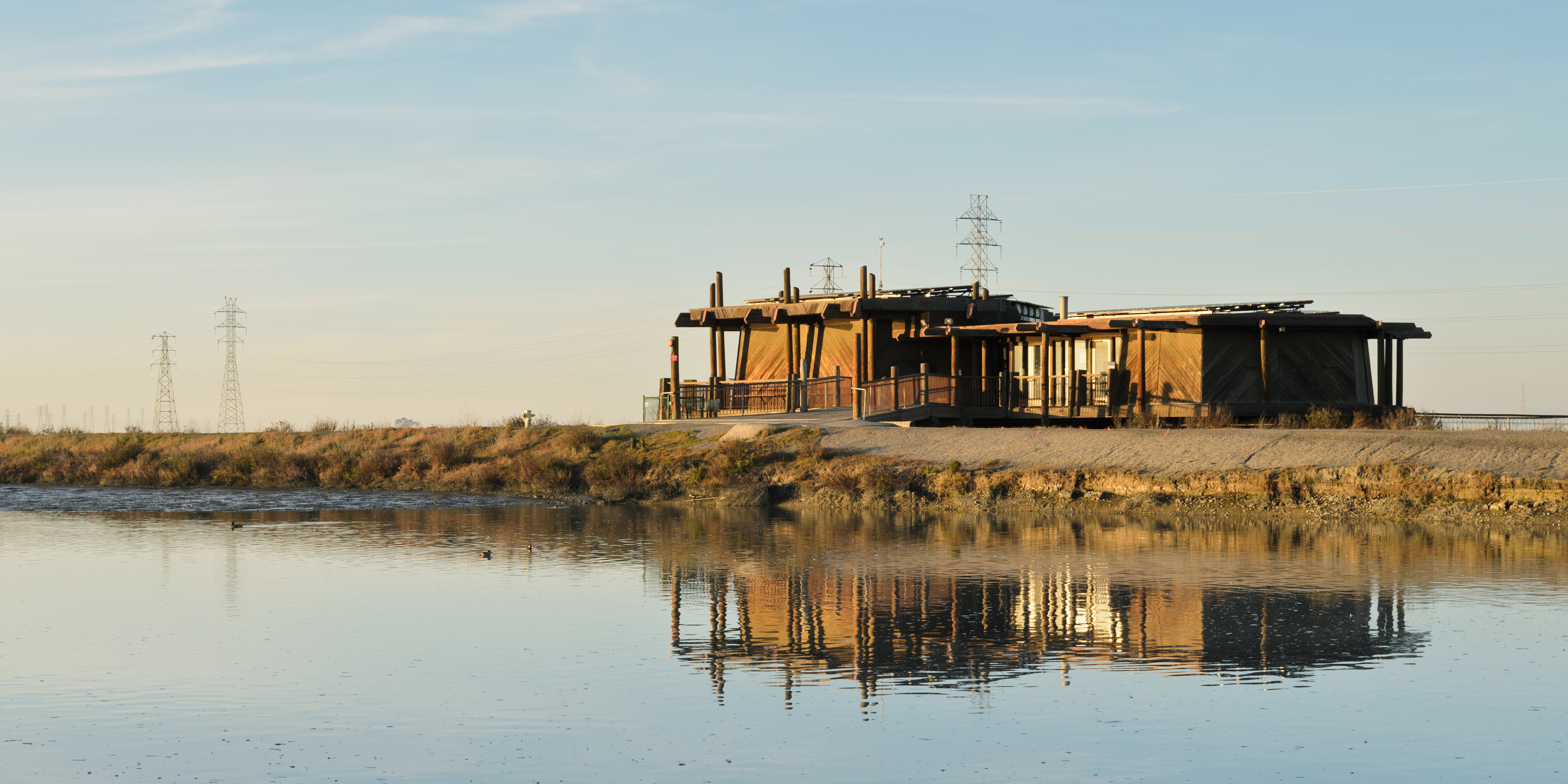
Palo Alto Baylands Nature Preserve interpretive center

Palo Alto is situated in the southeastern section of the San Francisco Peninsula.

It consists of two large parcels of land connected by a narrow corridor. The southern inland section, located south of Interstate 280, is hilly, rural, and lightly populated and is the site of Pearson–Arastradero Preserve and Foothills Park both part of the Palo Alto park system and also large parts of the Los Trancos and Monte Bello Open Space Preserves part of the Midpeninsula Regional Open Space District. The city extends as far as Skyline Boulevard along the ridge of the Santa Cruz Mountains.

The northern more densely populated parcel is bordered by San Francisquito Creek (with Menlo Park and East Palo Alto in adjacent San Mateo County beyond) to the north, San Francisco Bay to the north-east, Mountain View, Los Altos, and Los Altos Hills to the east and south-east and Stanford University to the south-west and west. Several major transit routes cross this parcel from the north-west to the south-east. The biggest and closest to the bay is the Bayshore Freeway and going inland are Alma Street/Central Expressway, El Camino Real, and Foothill Expressway. Interstate 280 is parallel and crosses the narrow corridor of land that connects the two parcels that makeup Palo Alto. Somewhat perpendicular to these roads are Sand Hill Road from El Camino until it crosses San Francisquito Creek into Menlo Park, Embarcadero Road, Oregon Expressway/Page Mill Road, Arastradero Road/East Charleston Road, and San Antonio Road (the last forms part of the boundary with Mountain View).

According to the United States Census Bureau, the city has a total area of 25.8 square miles (67 km^{2}), of which 23.9 square miles (62 km^{2}) is land and 1.9 square miles (4.9 km^{2}), 7.38%, is water.

The official elevation is 30 ft (9 m) above sea level, but the city boundaries reach well into the northern section of the Santa Cruz Mountains.

=== Water ===
Palo Alto is crossed by several creeks that flow north in the direction of the San Francisco Bay, Adobe Creek near its eastern boundary, San Francisquito Creek on its western boundary, and Matadero Creek in between the other two. Arastradero Creek is a tributary to Matadero Creek, and Barron Creek is now diverted to Adobe Creek just south of Highway 101 by a diversion channel. The San Francisquito Creek mainstem is formed by the confluence of Corte Madera Creek and Bear Creek not far below Searsville Dam. Further downstream, Los Trancos Creek is a tributary to San Francisquito Creek below Interstate 280.

=== Environmental features ===
Palo Alto has a number of significant natural habitats, including estuarine, riparian, and oak forest. Many of these habitats are visible in Foothills Park, which is owned by the city. The Charleston Slough contains a rich marsh and littoral zone, providing feeding areas for a variety of shorebirds and other estuarine wildlife.

=== Climate ===
Typical of the South Peninsula region of the San Francisco Bay Area, Palo Alto has a Mediterranean climate with mild, moderately wet winters and warm, dry summers. Typically, in the warmer months, as the sun goes down, the fog bank flows over the foothills to the west and covers the night sky, thus creating a blanket that helps trap the summer warmth absorbed during the day. Even so, it is rare for the overnight low temperature to exceed 60 °F (16 °C).

In January, average daily temperatures range from a low of 39.0 °F (3.9 °C) to a high of 57.8 °F (14.3 °C). In July, average temperatures range from 55.7 to 79.4 °F (13.2 to 26.3 °C). The record high temperature was 108 °F (42 °C) on September 6, 2022, and the record low temperature was 20 °F (−7 °C) on January 11, 1949, and December 24, 1990. Temperatures reach 90 °F (32 °C) or higher on an average of 12.0 days. Temperatures drop to 32 °F (0 °C) or lower on an average of 14.0 days.

Due to the Santa Cruz Mountains to the west, there is a "rain shadow" in Palo Alto, resulting in an average annual rainfall of only 15.12 in (384 mm). Measurable rainfall occurs on an average of 55.8 days annually. The wettest year on record was 1983 with 32.51 in (826 mm) and the driest year was 2013 with 3.81 in (97 mm). The most rainfall in one month was 12.43 in (316 mm) in February 1998 and the most rainfall in one day was 3.75 in (95 mm) on February 3, 1998. Measurable snowfall is very rare in the populated areas of Palo Alto, but 1.5 inches (3.8 cm) fell on January 21, 1962. A dusting of snow occasionally occurs in the highest (unpopulated) section of Palo Alto near Skyline Ridge, where the elevation reaches up to 2,812 feet (857 m).

According to the Köppen Climate Classification system, Palo Alto has a warm-summer Mediterranean climate (Csb).

Climate data for Palo Alto, California, 1991–2020 normals, extremes 1922–present
Month	Jan	Feb	Mar	Apr	May	Jun	Jul	Aug	Sep	Oct	Nov	Dec	Year
Record high °F (°C)	75 (24)	84 (29)	85 (29)	98 (37)	100 (38)	107 (42)	105 (41)	101 (38)	108 (42)	100 (38)	89 (32)	75 (24)	108 (42)
Mean maximum °F (°C)	66.2 (19.0)	70.9 (21.6)	75.9 (24.4)	84.2 (29.0)	88.6 (31.4)	93.6 (34.2)	93.3 (34.1)	92.4 (33.6)	91.5 (33.1)	86.9 (30.5)	74.4 (23.6)	65.8 (18.8)	97.9 (36.6)
Mean daily maximum °F (°C)	57.8 (14.3)	60.7 (15.9)	65.5 (18.6)	69.6 (20.9)	73.3 (22.9)	78.5 (25.8)	79.4 (26.3)	78.7 (25.9)	79.6 (26.4)	74.0 (23.3)	63.7 (17.6)	57.6 (14.2)	69.9 (21.0)
Daily mean °F (°C)	48.4 (9.1)	51.0 (10.6)	54.6 (12.6)	57.4 (14.1)	61.4 (16.3)	65.6 (18.7)	67.6 (19.8)	67.0 (19.4)	66.3 (19.1)	61.2 (16.2)	53.1 (11.7)	48.1 (8.9)	58.5 (14.7)
Mean daily minimum °F (°C)	39.0 (3.9)	41.3 (5.2)	43.6 (6.4)	45.3 (7.4)	49.5 (9.7)	52.7 (11.5)	55.7 (13.2)	55.3 (12.9)	53.0 (11.7)	48.4 (9.1)	42.5 (5.8)	38.6 (3.7)	47.1 (8.4)
Mean minimum °F (°C)	30.6 (−0.8)	32.5 (0.3)	35.1 (1.7)	38.0 (3.3)	41.6 (5.3)	46.1 (7.8)	48.6 (9.2)	49.7 (9.8)	46.1 (7.8)	40.4 (4.7)	33.5 (0.8)	29.7 (−1.3)	28.1 (−2.2)
Record low °F (°C)	20 (−7)	20 (−7)	22 (−6)	31 (−1)	33 (1)	40 (4)	40 (4)	44 (7)	37 (3)	32 (0)	26 (−3)	20 (−7)	20 (−7)
Average precipitation inches (mm)	2.95 (75)	3.18 (81)	2.19 (56)	0.97 (25)	0.44 (11)	0.10 (2.5)	0.00 (0.00)	0.03 (0.76)	0.07 (1.8)	0.64 (16)	1.60 (41)	2.95 (75)	15.12 (385.06)
Average precipitation days (≥ 0.01 in)	10.0	10.1	8.2	5.2	2.5	0.7	0.0	0.2	0.5	2.5	6.2	9.7	55.8
Source 1: NOAA
Source 2: XMACIS2 (mean maxima/minima 1981–2010)

== Local government ==
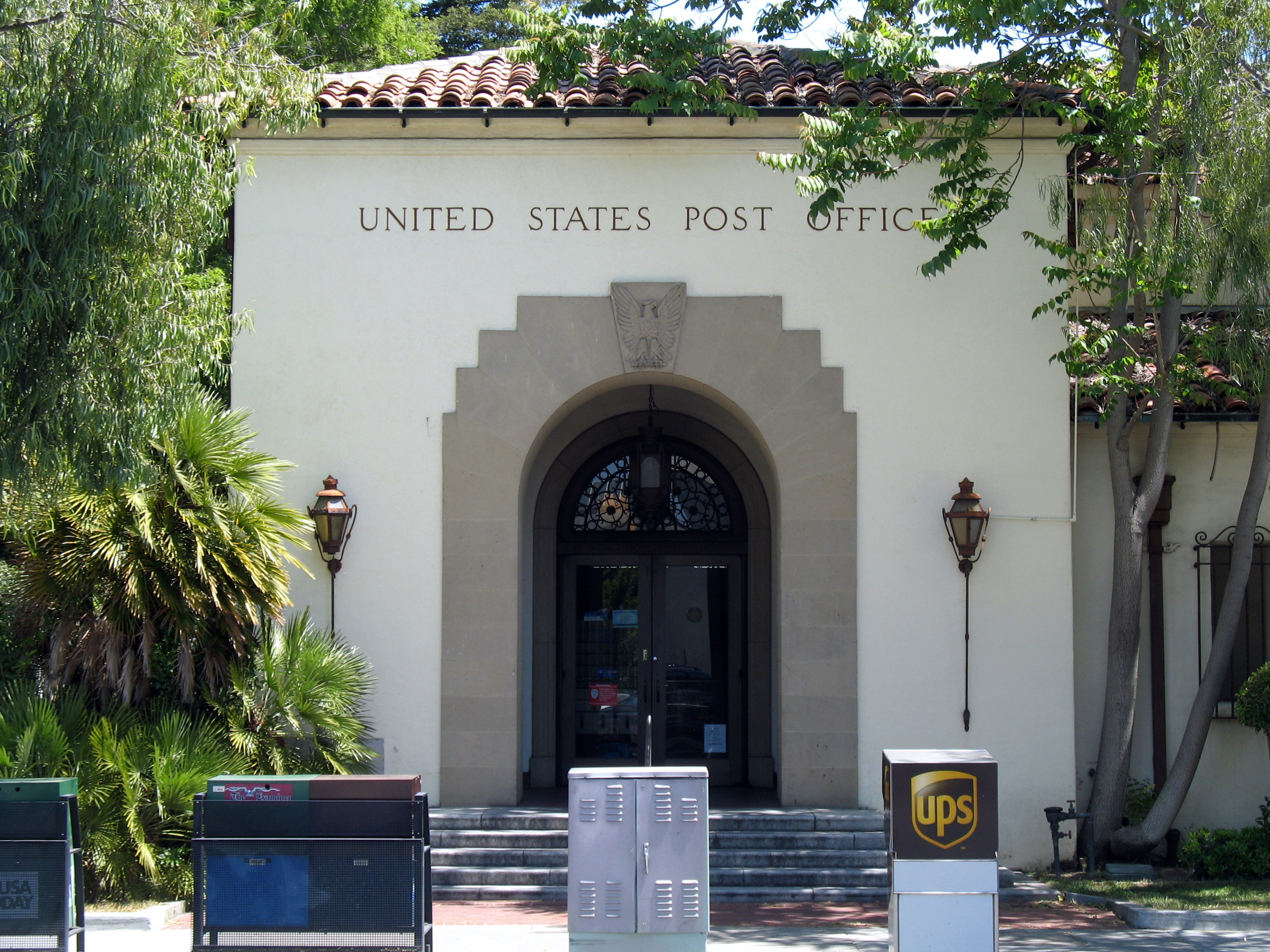
The historic post office

Palo Alto was incorporated in 1894. In 1909 a municipal charter created a local government consisting of a fifteen-member city council, with responsibilities for various governmental functions delegated to appointed committees. In 1950, the city adopted a Council–manager government. Several appointed committees continue to advise the city council on specialized issues, such as land-use planning, utilities, and libraries, but these committees no longer have direct authority over City staff. Currently, the city council has seven members.

The mayor and vice-mayor serve one year at a time, with terms ending in January. General municipal elections are held in November of even-numbered years. Council terms are four years long.

According to one study in 2015, the city's effective property tax rate of 0.42% was the lowest of the California cities included in the study.

== Politics ==
In the California State Legislature, Palo Alto is in the 13th senatorial district, represented by Democrat Josh Becker, and in the 23rd Assembly district, represented by Democrat Marc Berman.

In the United States House of Representatives, Palo Alto is in California's 16th congressional district, represented by Democrat Sam Liccardo.

According to the California Secretary of State, as of February 10, 2019, Palo Alto has 40,040 registered voters. Of those, 20,857 (52.1%) are registered Democrats, 4,689 (11.7%) are registered Republicans, and 13,520 (33.8%) have declined to state a political party.

== Demographics ==
Historical population
Census	Pop.	Note	%±
1900	1,658		—
1910	4,486		170.6%
1920	5,900		31.5%
1930	13,652		131.4%
1940	16,774		22.9%
1950	25,475		51.9%
1960	52,287		105.2%
1970	56,040		7.2%
1980	55,225		−1.5%
1990	55,900		1.2%
2000	58,598		4.8%
2010	64,403		9.9%
2020	68,572		6.5%
U.S. Decennial Census

=== Racial and ethnic composition ===
Palo Alto city, California - Racial and ethnic composition Note: the US Census treats Hispanic/Latino as an ethnic category. This table excludes Latinos from the racial categories and assigns them to a separate category. Hispanics/Latinos may be of any race.
Race / Ethnicity (NH = Non-Hispanic)	Pop 2000	Pop 2010	Pop 2020	% 2000	% 2010	% 2020
White alone (NH)	42,682	39,052	33,243	72.84%	60.64%	48.48%
Black or African American alone (NH)	1,166	1,131	1,170	1.99%	1.76%	1.71%
Native American or Alaska Native alone (NH)	88	65	37	0.15%	0.10%	0.05%
Asian alone (NH)	10,056	17,404	24,246	17.16%	27.02%	35.36%
Native Hawaiian or Pacific Islander alone (NH)	81	135	146	0.14%	0.21%	0.21%
Other race alone (NH)	183	254	503	0.31%	0.39%	0.73%
Mixed race or Multiracial (NH)	1,620	2,388	4,136	2.76%	3.71%	6.03%
Hispanic or Latino (any race)	2,722	3,974	5,091	4.65%	6.17%	7.42%
Total	58,598	64,403	68,572	100.00%	100.00%	100.00%

=== 2020 census ===
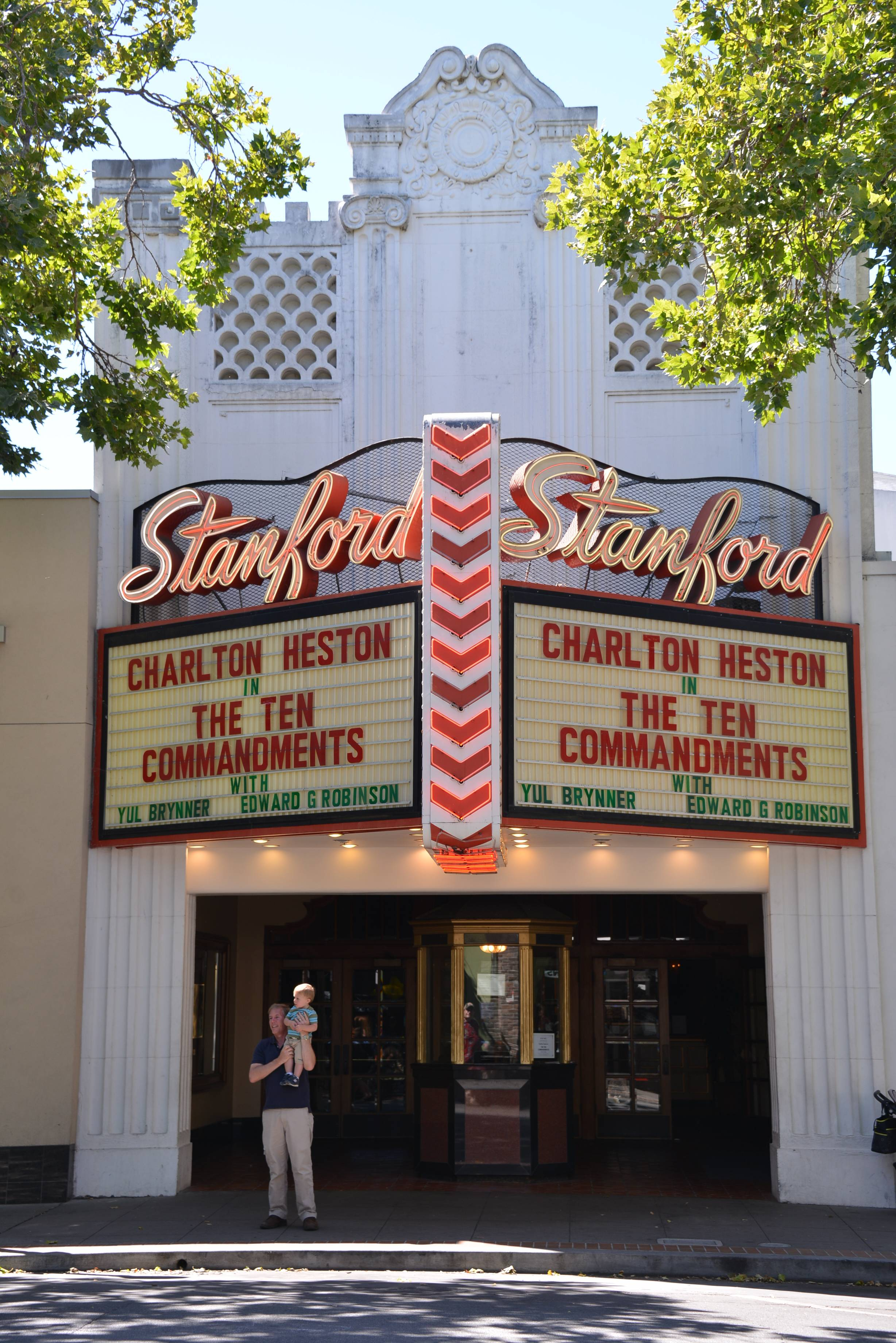
Stanford Theatre, built 1924-25

As of the 2020 census, Palo Alto had a population of 68,572. The population density was 2,845.8 inhabitants per square mile (1,098.8/km^{2}).

The census reported that 98.8% of the population lived in households, 0.2% lived in non-institutionalized group quarters, and 1.0% were institutionalized. It also reported that 99.5% of residents lived in urban areas, while 0.5% lived in rural areas.

There were 26,677 households, out of which 32.7% included children under the age of 18, 55.0% were married-couple households, 4.2% were cohabiting couple households, 24.5% had a female householder with no spouse or partner present, and 16.3% had a male householder with no spouse or partner present. About 26.6% of households were one-person households, and 13.3% had someone living alone who was 65 years of age or older. The average household size was 2.54, and there were 17,563 families (65.8% of all households).

The age distribution was 21.8% under the age of 18, 7.1% aged 18 to 24, 24.8% aged 25 to 44, 26.7% aged 45 to 64, and 19.6% who were 65 years of age or older. The median age was 42.2 years. For every 100 females, there were 96.7 males, and for every 100 females age 18 and over, there were 93.9 males age 18 and over.

There were 28,904 housing units at an average density of 1,199.5 units per square mile (463.1 units/km^{2}), of which 26,677 (92.3%) were occupied. Of occupied units, 52.7% were owner-occupied and 47.3% were occupied by renters. Of all housing units, 7.7% were vacant. The homeowner vacancy rate was 1.2%, and the rental vacancy rate was 6.2%.

=== 2023 ACS 5-year estimate ===
In 2023, the US Census Bureau estimated that the median household income was $220,408, and the per capita income was $121,565. About 3.2% of families and 5.4% of the population were below the poverty line.

=== 2010 census ===
The 2010 United States census reported that Palo Alto had a population of 64,403. The population density was 2,497.5 inhabitants per square mile (964.3/km^{2}). The racial makeup of Palo Alto was 41,359 (64.2%) White, 17,461 (27.1%) Asian, 1,197 (1.9%) African American, 121 (0.2%) Native American, 142 (0.2%) Pacific Islander, 1,426 (2.2%) from other races, and 2,697 (4.2%) from two or more races. Hispanic or Latino of any race were 3,974 persons (6.2%).

The Census reported that 63,820 people (99.1% of the population) lived in households, 205 (0.3%) lived in non-institutionalized group quarters, and 378 (0.6%) were institutionalized.

There were 26,493 households, out of which 8,624 (32.6%) had children under the age of 18 living in them, 13,975 (52.7%) were opposite-sex married couples living together, 1,843 (7.0%) had a female householder with no husband present, 659 (2.5%) had a male householder with no wife present. There were 979 (3.7%) unmarried opposite-sex partnerships, and 188 (0.7%) same-sex married couples or partnerships. 7,982 households (30.1%) were made up of individuals, and 3,285 (12.4%) had someone living alone who was 65 years of age or older. The average household size was 2.41. There were 16,477 families (62.2% of all households); the average family size was 3.04.

The population was spread out, with 15,079 people (23.4%) under the age of 18, 3,141 people (4.9%) aged 18 to 24, 17,159 people (26.6%) aged 25 to 44, 18,018 people (28.0%) aged 45 to 64, and 11,006 people (17.1%) who were 65 years of age or older. The median age was 41.9 years. For every 100 females, there were 95.7 males. For every 100 females aged 18 and over, there were 93.0 males.

There were 28,216 housing units at an average density of 1,094.2 units per square mile (422.5 units/km^{2}), of which 14,766 (55.7%) were owner-occupied, and 11,727 (44.3%) were occupied by renters. The homeowner vacancy rate was 1.5%; the rental vacancy rate was 5.6%. 39,176 people (60.8% of the population) lived in owner-occupied housing units and 24,644 people (38.3%) lived in rental housing units.

== Housing ==
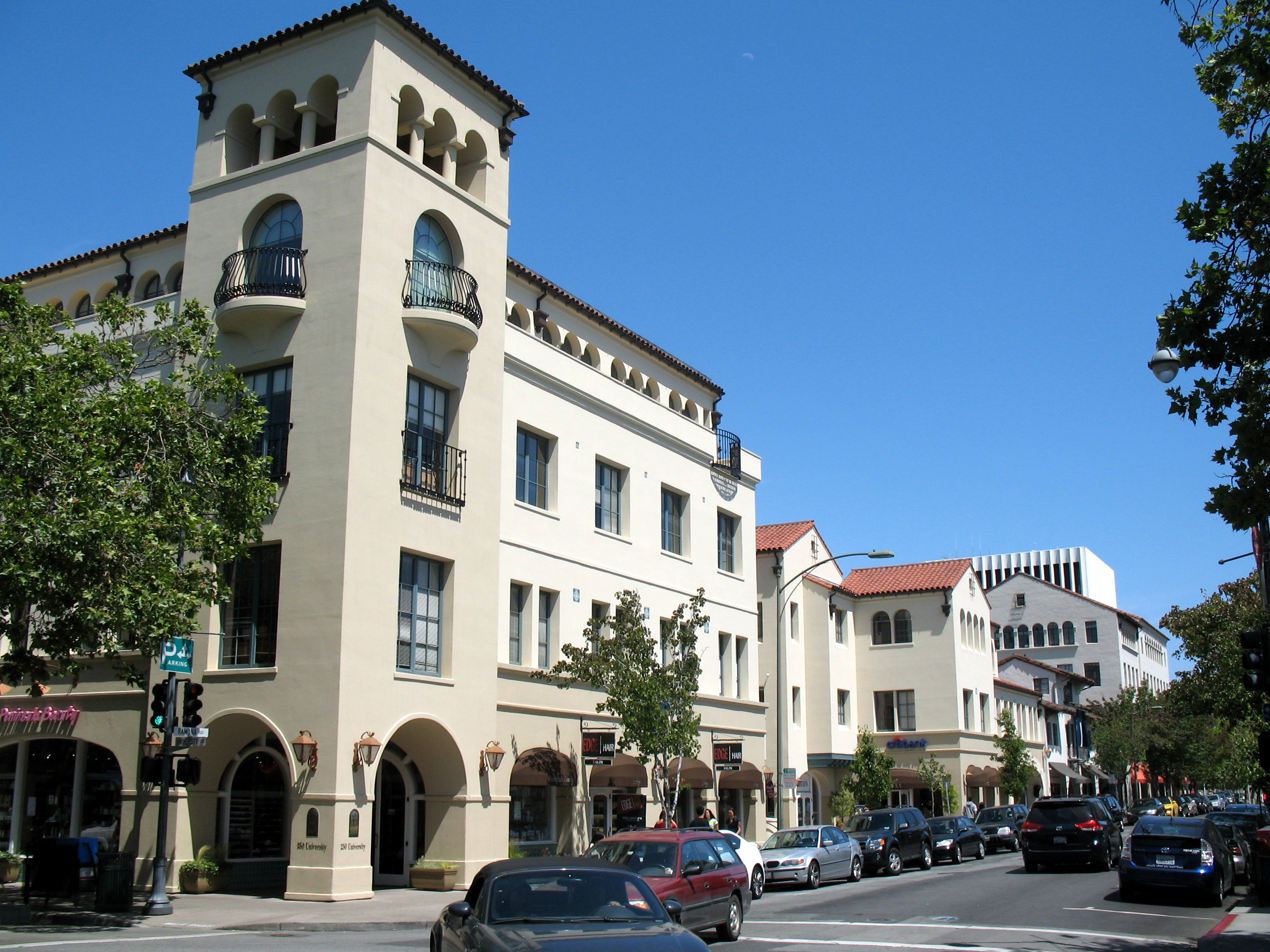
Mixed-use buildings on Ramona St.

Palo Alto, north of Oregon Expressway, is filled with older homes, including Craftsman and California Colonials, some of which date back to the 1890s but most of which were built in the first four decades of the 20th century. South of Oregon Expressway, the homes, including many Joseph Eichler-designed or Eichler-style houses, were primarily built in the first 20 years after World War II.

While the city contains homes that now cost anywhere from $800,000 to well over $40 million, much of Palo Alto's housing stock is in the style of California mid-century middle-class suburbia. The median home sale price for all of Palo Alto was $1.2 million in 2007 and $1.4 million in July 2009. Palo Alto ranked in as the 5th most expensive city in the United States as of 2007, with an average home sales price of $1,677,000. In 2010, Palo Alto ranked as the 2nd most expensive city in the United States, with a four-bedroom, two-bathroom home listing for $1.48 million on average. Palo Alto is by some measures the most expensive college town in the United States.

By 2020, residents' opposition to new housing has resulted in Palo Alto only allowing construction of enough low-income housing to meet 13% of its state-mandated share, and 6% of its share for very-low-income housing.

=== History of housing ===
In the 1920s, racial covenants were used that banned "persons of African, Japanese, Chinese, or Mongolian descent" from purchasing or renting homes in many neighborhoods throughout Palo Alto. In the 1950s, some movements opposed these policies, including the Palo Alto Fair Play Association, as well as architect and developer Joseph Eichler, who built almost 3,000 homes in Palo Alto.

Blockbusting strategies were also employed to instill fear in white neighborhoods and cause White flight out of areas on the outskirts of the city. Blockbusting refers to a practice realtors adopted in which they would advertise the incoming presence of a black family to a neighborhood, causing panic among the white residents who would consequently sell their houses at deflated prices very quickly. One famous blockbusting event is responsible for the prevailing demographic divides between Palo Alto and East Palo Alto.

One of the most destructive policies at the time was redlining. Redlining was a policy put in place by the Federal Housing Association starting in 1937. Through the program, the association could rank neighborhoods from Type A, which was desirable, to Type D (outlined in red) which was deemed hazardous. Residents in Type D neighborhoods were ineligible for loans to buy or fix houses. The program was implemented in a way so that neighborhoods with any kind of African American population were ranked type C or D. This was also the case in Palo Alto and the surrounding areas. Palo Alto's White neighborhoods were ranked mostly Type A and B, allowing for wealth accumulation and eventually resulting in the high housing prices we see today. On the other hand, the surrounding areas were all marked Type C and D, and African Americans found themselves being driven to the outskirts of Palo Alto, what is now mostly East Palo Alto, where there was no money from loans in the economy, leading to a state of decay.

However, for the most part, Palo Alto's housing was built on policies that are still reflected in the current demographics.

== Economy ==
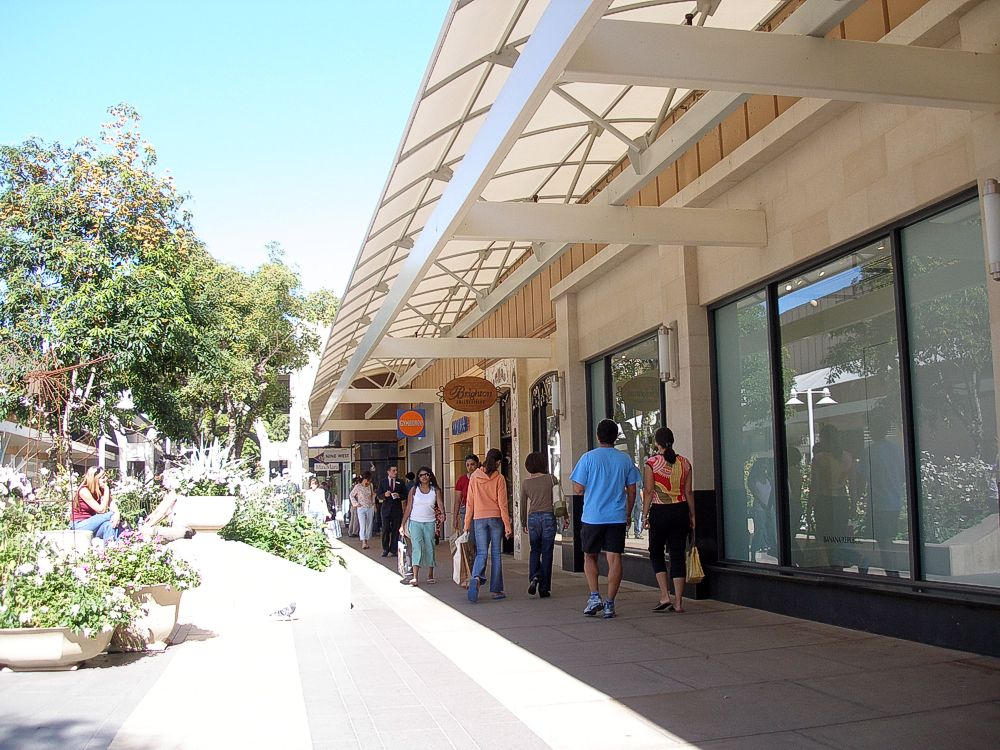
Stanford Shopping Center

Palo Alto serves as a central economic focal point of the Silicon Valley and is home to more than 7,000 businesses employing more than 98,000 people. In the mid-1950s Palo Alto had a railroad village feel and the streets were lined with bungalows and prim storefronts. At a time when only 7 percent of American adults had completed four years of college, more than a third of men living in the Palo Alto suburb had a college degree. In 1949 Wallace Sterling had been appointed as Stanford's president and Frederick Terman became provost. The fledgling Stanford University was reorganized, offering applied educational programs on physics, material science, and electrical engineering. Stanford's basic research capabilities were built up and the laboratory facilities for applied work were brought together in the Stanford Electronics Laboratories.

Many prominent technology firms reside in the Stanford Research Park on Page Mill Road, while nearby Sand Hill Road in the adjacent city of Menlo Park is a notable hub of venture capitalists.

A number of prominent Silicon Valley companies no longer reside primarily in Palo Alto. These include Google (now in Mountain View), Facebook (now in Menlo Park), and PayPal (now in San Jose).

In 2021, Tesla, Inc. moved its headquarters from Palo Alto to Austin, Texas.

Palo Alto's retail and restaurant trade includes Stanford Shopping Center, an upscale open air shopping center established in 1955, downtown Palo Alto, centered on University Avenue, Town & Country Village off of El Camino, and the California Avenue shopping district in its second downtown.

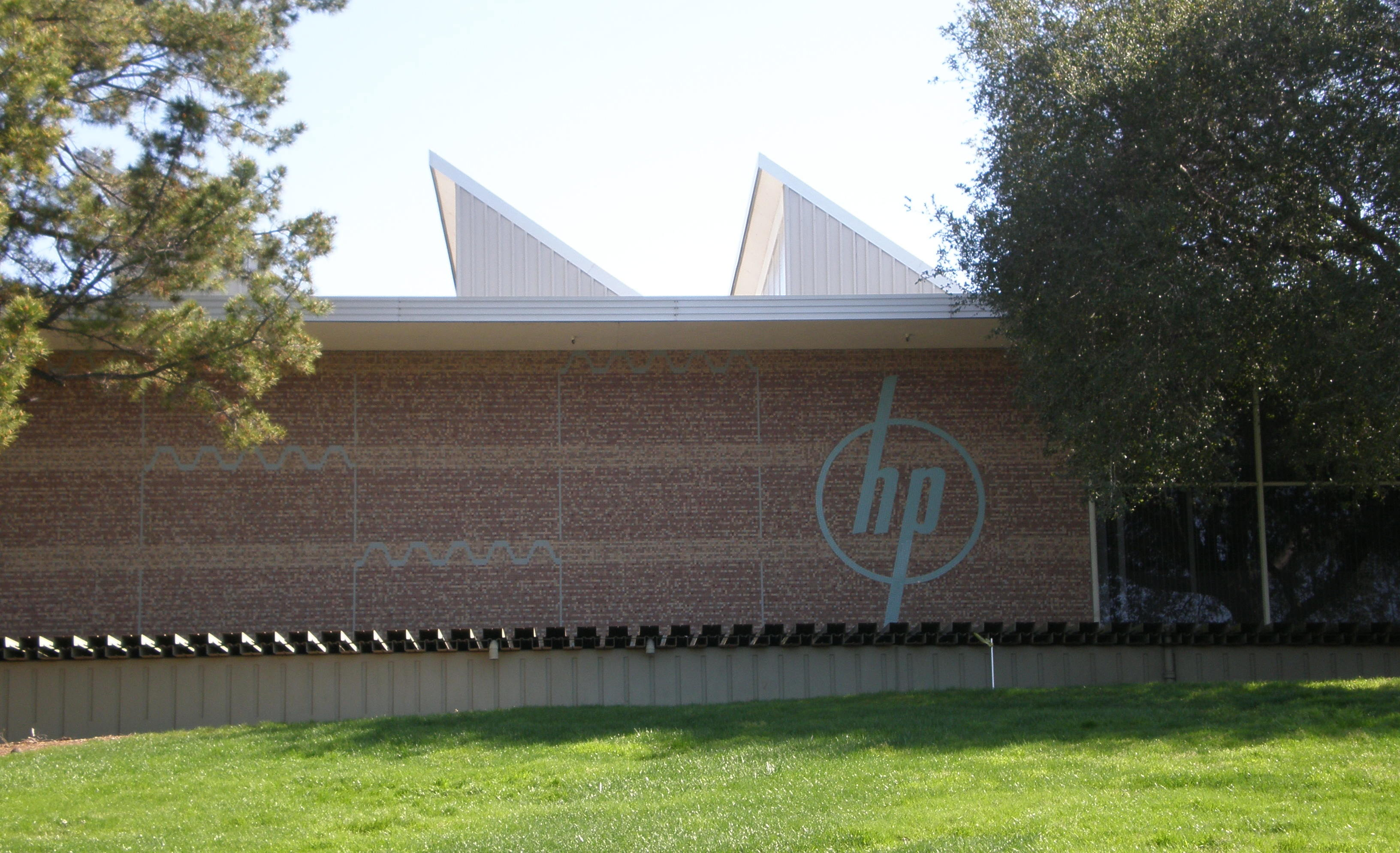
HP headquarters

Palo Alto is the location of the first street-level Apple Store, the first Apple mini store, the first West Coast Whole Foods Market store, and the first Victoria's Secret.

=== Top employers ===
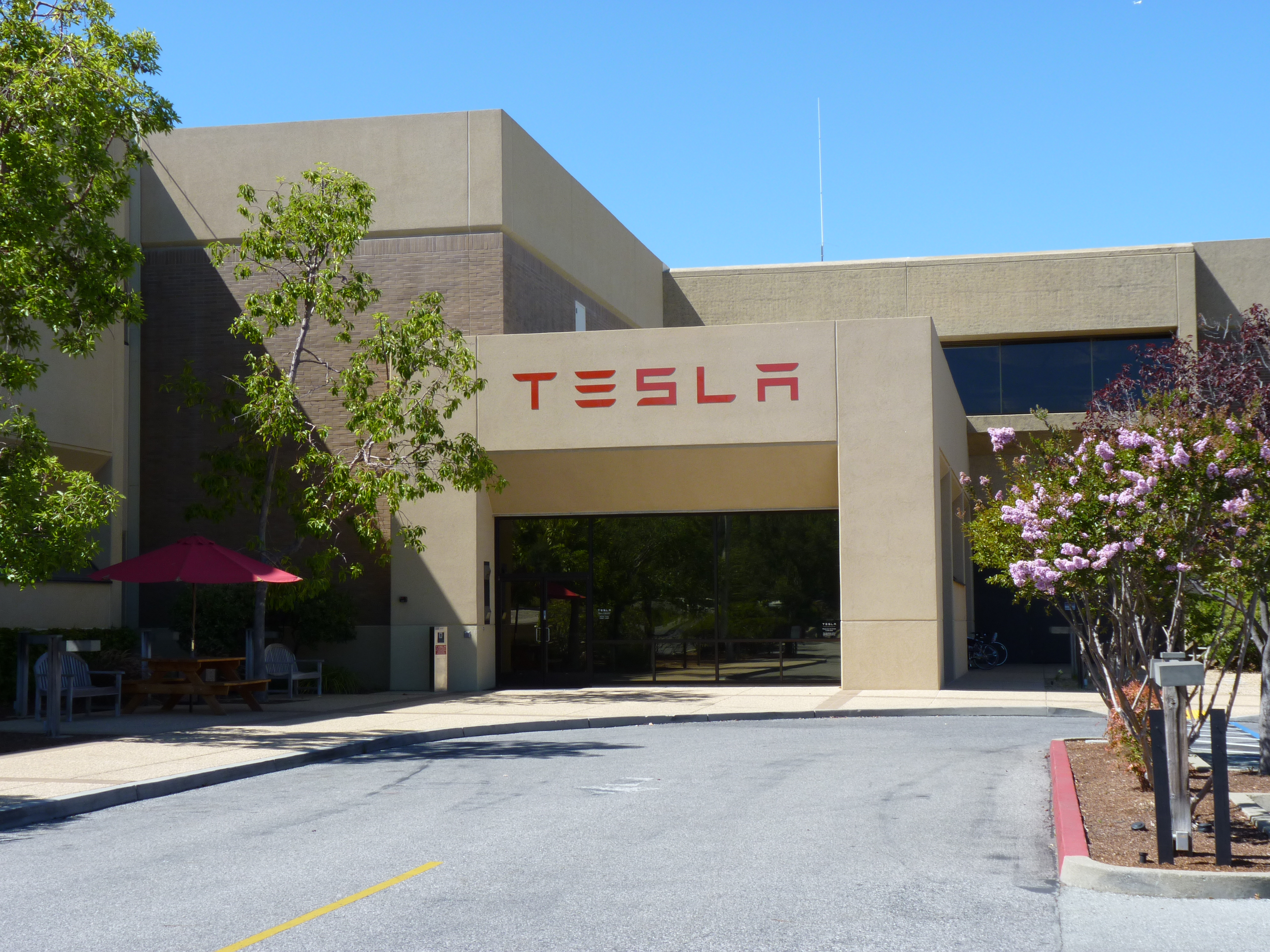
Former Tesla Motors headquarters

According to the city's 2025 Annual Comprehensive Annual Financial Report, the top employers in the city are:

#	Employer	# of Employees
1	Stanford (University and Health Care)	18,000
2	Broadcom (VMware)	2,781
3	Varian Medical Systems	1,710
4	Hewlett-Packard	1,632
5	Veteran's Affairs Palo Alto Health Care System	1,323
6	Wilson Sonsini Goodrich & Rosati	1,100
7	City of Palo Alto	1,092
8	Roche Palo Alto LLC	1,050
9	Brocade Communications Systems LLC	800
10	Workday, Inc.	714

== Utilities ==
Palo Alto has a city-run and owned utility, City of Palo Alto Utilities (CPAU), which provides water, electric, gas service, and waste water disposal within city limits, with the minor exception of a rural portion of the city in the hills west of Interstate 280, past the Country Club, which does not receive gas from the city. Almost all other communities in northern California depend on Pacific Gas and Electric Company (PG&E) for gas and electricity.

Water and Gas Services (WGS) operates gas and water distribution networks within the city limits. The city operates both gas meters and the distribution pipelines. Water comes from city-operated watershed and wells and the City and County of San Francisco Hetch Hetchy system. The city is located in Santa Clara Valley Water District, North Zone. Hetch Hetchy pipeline #3 and #4 pass through the city.

The city operates its own electric power distribution network and telemetry cable network. Interconnection points tie the city into PG&E's electric transmission system, which brings power from several sources to the city. Palo Alto is a member of a joint powers authority (the Northern California Power Agency), which cooperatively generates electricity for government power providers such as the City of Santa Clara, the City of Redding, and the Port of Oakland. Roughly the same group of entities operate the Transmission Agency of Northern California (TANC). TANC transports power over its own lines from as far as British Columbia through an interconnection with the federal Bonneville Power Administration. A local oddity is a series of joint poles; those primary conductor cross arms are marked PGE and CPA (City of Palo Alto) to identify each utility's side of the shared cross arms.

Palo Alto has an ongoing community debate about the city providing fiber optic connectivity to all residences. A series of pilot programs have been proposed. One proposal called for the city to install dark fiber, which would be made live by a contractor.

Services traditionally attributed to a cable television provider were sold to a regulated commercial concern. Previously the cable system was operated by a cooperative called Palo Alto Cable Coop.

The former Regional Bell Operating Company in Palo Alto was Pacific Telephone, now called AT&T Inc., and previously called SBC and Pacific Bell. One of the earliest central office facilities switching Palo Alto calls is the historic Davenport central office (CO) at 529 Bryant Street. The building was sold and is now the home of the Palo Alto Internet Exchange. The former CO building is marked by a bronze plaque and is located on the north side of Bryant Street between University Avenue and Hamilton Avenue. It was called Davenport after the exchange name at the introduction of dial telephone service in Palo Alto. For example, modern numbers starting with 325- were Davenport 5 in the 1950s and '60s. The Step-by-Step office was scrapped and replaced by stored-program-controlled equipment at a different location about 1980. Stanford calls ran on a Step-by-Step Western Electric 701 PBX until the university purchased its own switch about 1980. It had the older, traditional Bell System 600 Hz+120 Hz dial tone. The old 497-number PBX, MDF, and battery string were housed in a steel building at 333 Bonair Siding. From the 1950s to 1980s, the bulk of Palo Alto calls were switched on Number 5 Crossbar systems. By the mid-1980s, these electromechanical systems had been junked. Under the Bell System's regulated monopoly, local coin telephone calls were ten cents until the early 1980s.

During the drought of the early 1990s, Palo Alto employed water waste patrol officers to enforce water saving regulations. The team, called "Gush Busters", patrolled city streets looking for broken water pipes and poorly managed irrigation systems. Regulations were set to stop restaurants from habitually serving water, runoff from irrigation, and irrigation during the day. The main goal of the team was to educate the public in ways to save water. Citations consisted of Friendly Reminder postcards and more formal notices. To help promote the conservation message, the team only used bicycles and mopeds.

== Fire and police departments ==
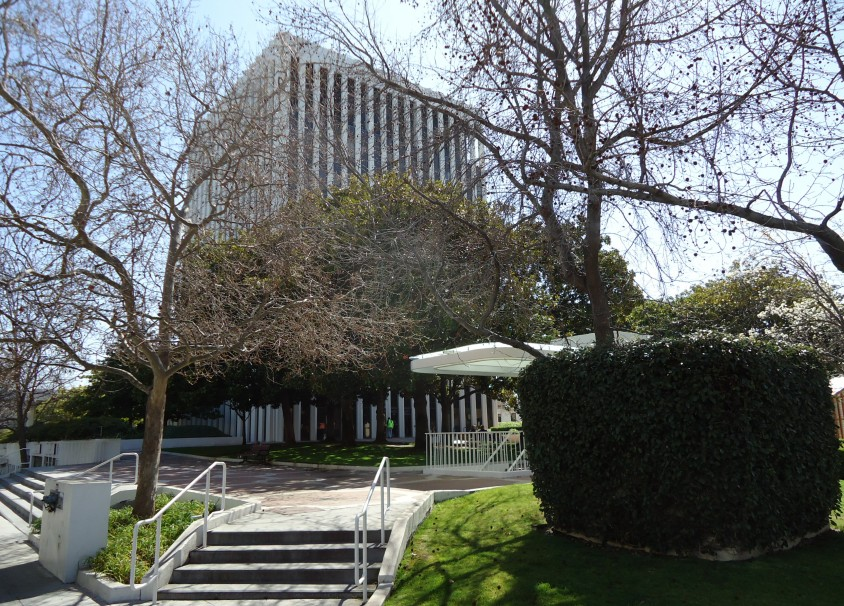
Palo Alto's city hall

The city was among the first in Santa Clara County to offer advanced life support (ALS) paramedic-level (EMT-P) ambulance service. In an arrangement predating countywide paramedic service, Palo Alto Fire operates two paramedic ambulances which are theoretically shared with county EMS assets. The Palo Alto Fire Department is currently the only fire department in Santa Clara County that routinely transports patients. Rural Metro holds the Santa Clara County 911 contract and provides transportation in other cities. Enhanced 9-1-1 arrived in about 1980 and included the then-new ability to report emergencies from coin telephones without using a coin. Palo Alto Fire also has a contract with Stanford University to cover most of the campus. In all, the Fire Department has six regular stations plus one opened only during the summer fire season in the foothills.

The police station was originally housed in a stone building at 450 Bryant Street. Still engraved with the words Police Court, the building is now a non-profit senior citizen center, Avenidas. The police are now headquartered in the City Hall high rise. The department has just under 100 sworn officers ranking supplemented by approximately ten reserve officers and professional staff who support the police department and the animal services organization.

The Barron Park donkey pasture, in Bol Park, has one of the original firetrucks used by the volunteer Barron Park fire department (before it was incorporated into Palo Alto).

== Education ==
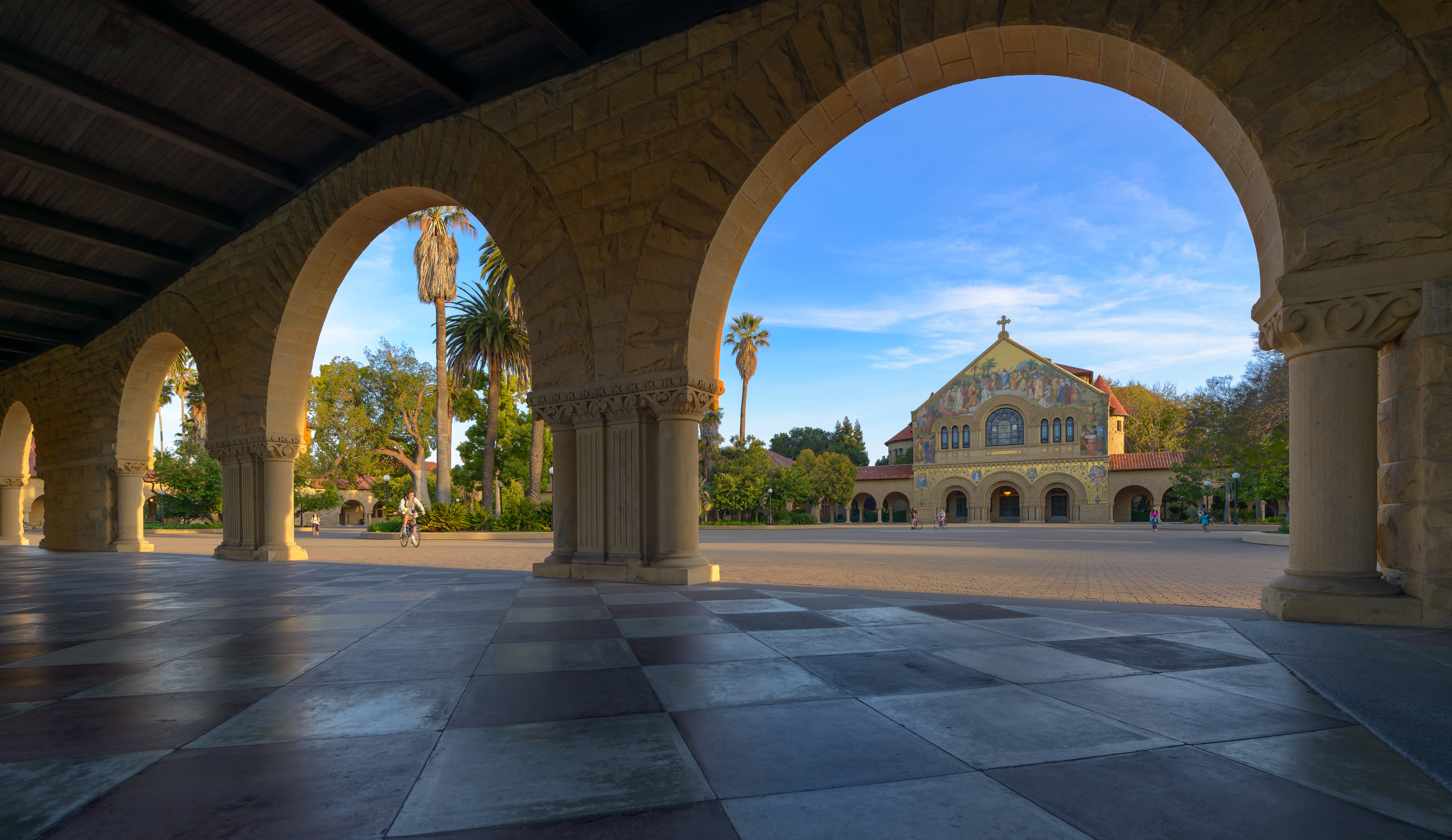
Stanford University is adjacent to Palo Alto.

=== Public schools ===
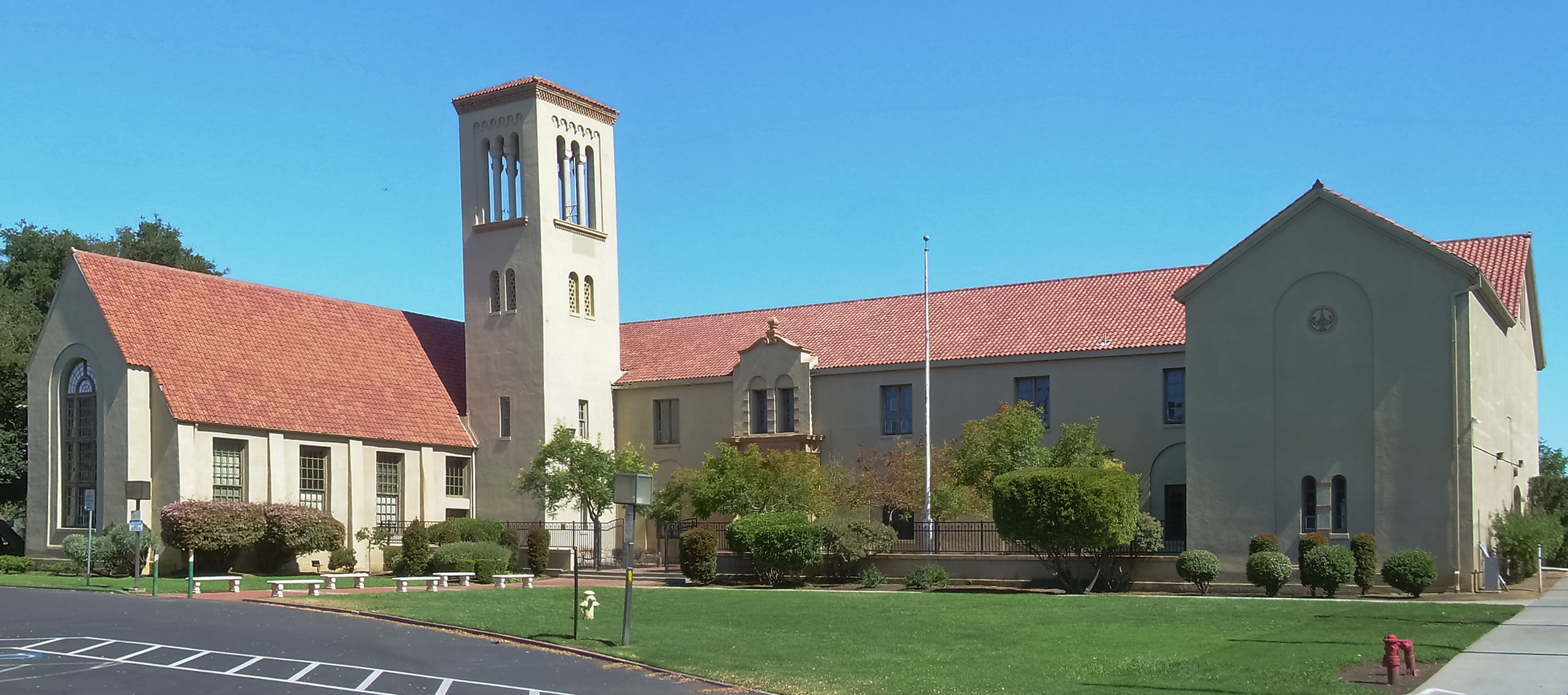
Palo Alto High School, built in 1918 in a Spanish Colonial Revival style

The Palo Alto Unified School District provides public education for most of Palo Alto. According to the National Center for Education Statistics, Palo Alto has a student-teacher ratio of 14.9, much lower than some surrounding communities. Juana Briones Elementary has a student/teacher ratio of 14.4. The school board meets at 7 p.m. on the 2nd and 4th Tuesdays of the month; the meetings are open to the public and city, cast live on Channel 28. Channel 28 is operated by the Mid-peninsula Community Media Center in Palo Alto, which is affiliated with the Alliance for Community Media. ACM represents over 2,000 PEG channels in the US. Government-access television (GATV) Cable TV. PAUSD high school students attend either Gunn High School or Palo Alto High School. There are three middle schools in the school district: JLS, Greene, and Fletcher. Fletcher students typically go to Gunn, while Greene students go to Palo Alto High School. JLS students are split between the two.

PAUSD also owns the property of Cubberly Community Center, which was formerly the Ellwood P. Cubberley High School.

The Los Altos School District and Mountain View–Los Altos Union High School District provide public education for the Monroe neighborhood portion of Palo Alto off El Camino Real south of Adobe Creek.

=== Private schools ===
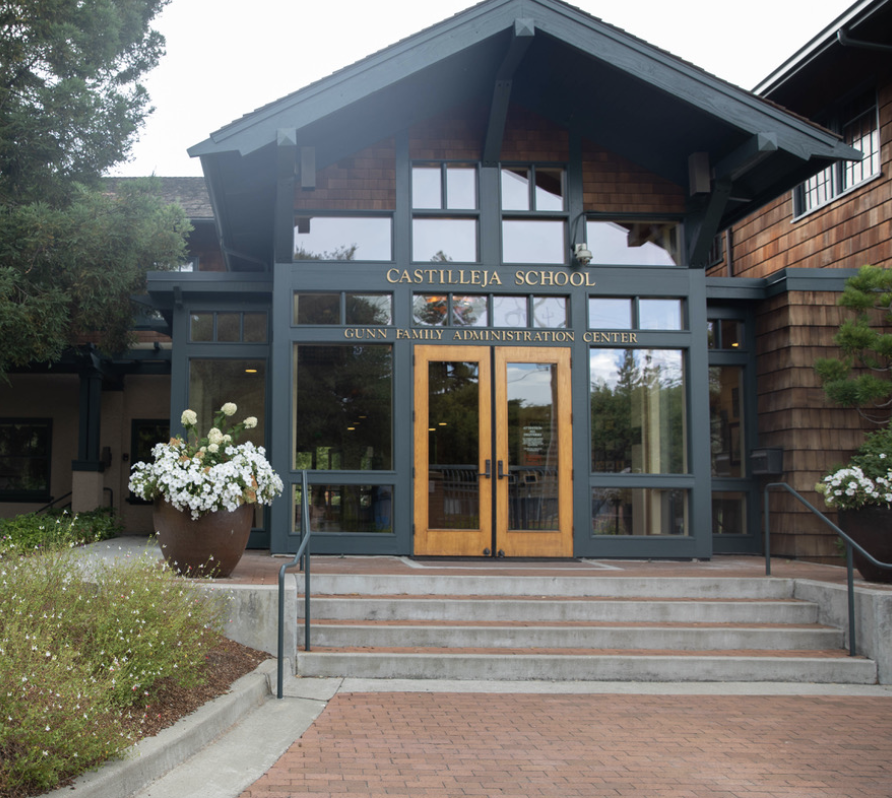
Castilleja School, founded in 1907

- Athena Academy—a 1st through 8th grade school for dyslexic students founded in 2010.
- Bowman School – a Pre-K to 12 Montessori school founded in 1995
- Castilleja School – an all-girls' college preparatory school for grades 6–12 founded in 1907
- Challenger School – a K–8 School
- Esther B. Clark School – a school for children with mental or behavioral challenges
- Fusion Academy Palo Alto – a small for-profit 1-1 alternative school for 6–12
- Gideon Hausner Jewish Day School – a K–8 Jewish day school that opened in 1990; school's name changed from Mid-Peninsula Jewish Community Day School (MPJCDS) to its current name in 2003 to honor Gideon Hausner. Current enrollment is about 300.
- The Girls' Middle School – an independent, all-girls day school founded in 1998 in Mountain View and moved to Palo Alto in 2011. It has about 200 students in grades 6–8.
- Kehillah Jewish High School – a high school with both secular and Jewish studies founded in 2002 in San Jose and moved to Palo Alto in 2005.
- Keys School – a co-ed, independent K-8 school
- Living Wisdom School – a K-8 school
- Meira Academy – an Orthodox Jewish all-girls high school, founded in 2011
- Sand Hill School – a K–7 school
- St. Elizabeth Seton Catholic School – a Catholic school for preschool through eighth grade located in Palo Alto
- Silicon Valley International School – a bilingual immersion school with its Palo Alto campus housing the K–5 elementary school. Established in 1979.
- Stratford School – a K–8 school
- Tru School – a K–5 school

=== Weekend schools ===
- Palo Alto Chinese School – oldest Chinese school in Bay Area.

=== Higher education ===
Palo Alto is home to Palo Alto University, a school focused on psychology.

The main academic campus of Stanford University, a private research university, is adjacent to Palo Alto. The university also includes lands in the Palo Alto city limits.

== Libraries ==
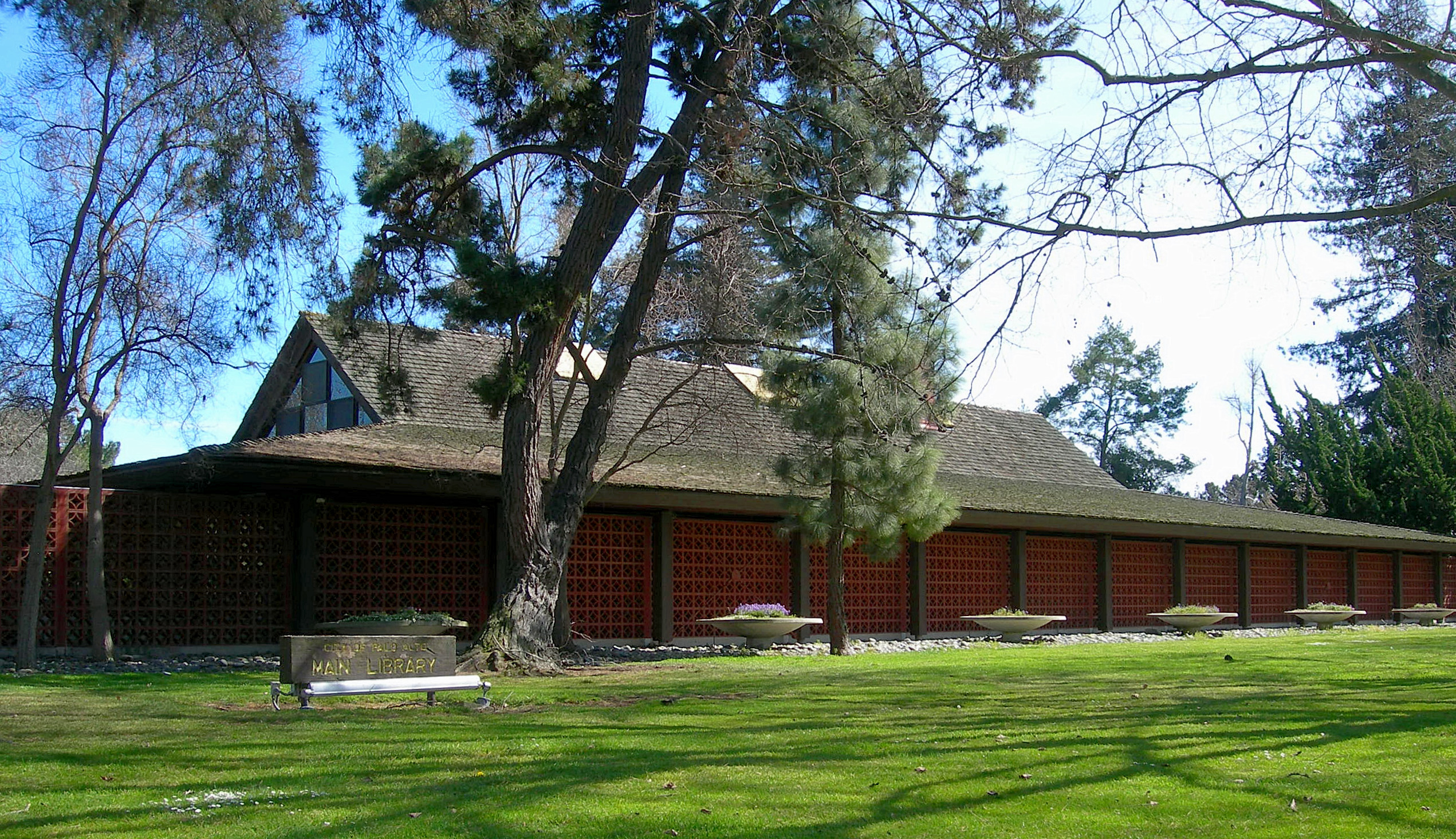
The Rinconada branch of the Palo Alto City Library

The Palo Alto City Library has five branches, with a total of 265,000 items in their collections. The Mitchell Park Library was rebuilt between 2010 and December 2014 to become the largest in Palo Alto. The former Main Library was then renamed the Rinconada branch. Palo Alto Children's Library is located close to the former Main Library. There are smaller branches in the Downtown and College Terrace neighborhoods.

== Media ==
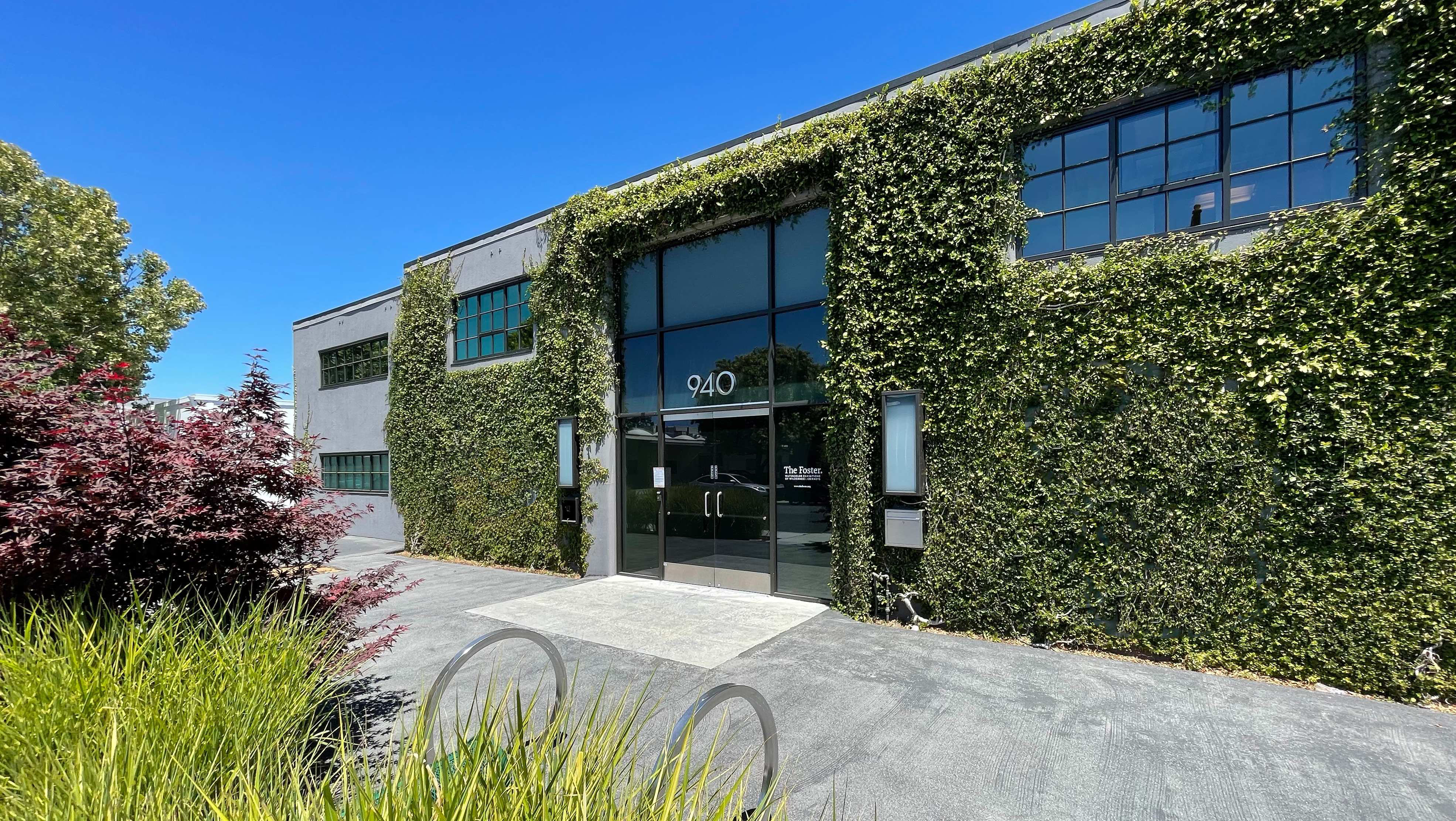
The Foster Museum

The Palo Alto Daily Post publishes six days a week. Palo Alto Daily News, a unit of the San Jose Mercury News, publishes five days a week. Palo Alto Weekly is published on Fridays. Palo Alto Times, a daily newspaper, served Palo Alto and neighboring cities beginning in 1893. It became the Peninsula Times Tribune in 1979 and ceased publication in 1993.

KDOW, 1220 AM, began broadcasting in 1949 as KIBE. It later became KDFC, simulcasting classical KDFC-FM. As KDOW it broadcasts a business news format. The transmitter is in East Palo Alto near the western approach to the Dumbarton Bridge. Power is 5,000 watts daytime and 145 watts nighttime. KZSU at 90.1 FM is owned by Stanford University. KFJC at 89.7 FM is licensed to nearby Los Altos and is licensed to the Foothill-De Anza Community College District.

KTLN-TV, virtual channel 68, transmits from Mt. Allison across San Francisco bay, east of Palo Alto.

The Midpeninsula Community Media Center provides public, educational, and government access (PEG) cable television channels 26, 28, 29, 30 and 75.

== Transportation ==
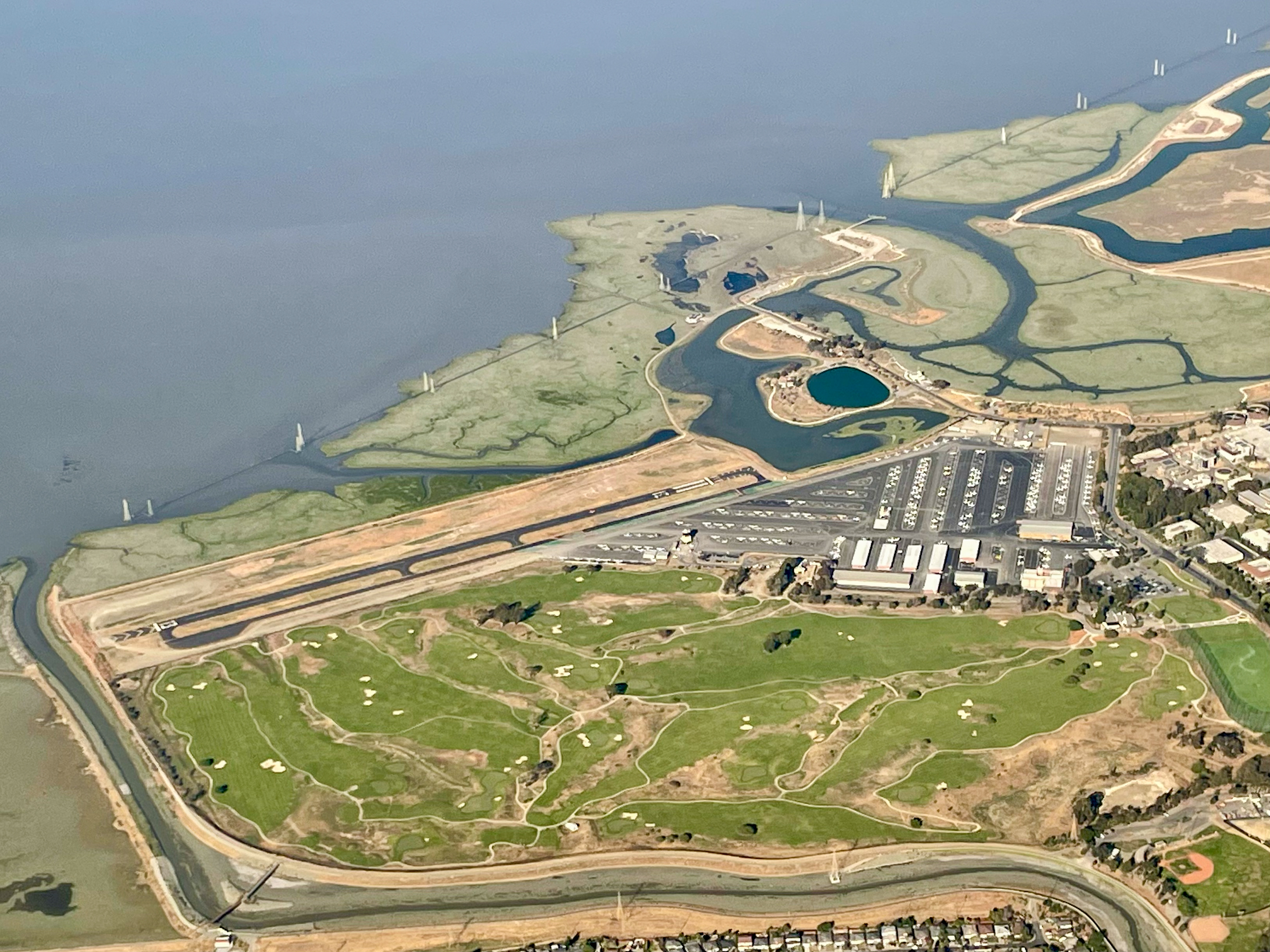
Palo Alto Airport

=== Roads ===
Palo Alto is served by two major freeways, Highway 101 and Interstate 280 and is traversed by the Peninsula's main north–south boulevard, El Camino Real (SR 82). Santa Clara County maintains 2 expressways in Palo Alto; Route G3 is the city's main east–west route and is the only road in the city that connects the two freeways directly. Route G6 travels through the city as Alma Street, serving as an alternate route to SR 82. The city is also served indirectly by State Route 84 which traverses the Dumbarton Bridge to the north, and State Route 85 via Mountain View to the south.

There are no parking meters in Palo Alto, and all municipal parking lots and multi-level parking structures are free but limited to two or three hours per weekday 8am–5pm. Downtown Palo Alto has recently added many new lots to fill the overflow of vehicles. Beginning in 2014, Palo Alto has begun implementing permit parking in some areas of the town.

=== Air ===
Palo Alto is served by Palo Alto Airport (KPAO), one of the busiest single-runway general aviation airports in the country. It is used by many daily commuters who fly (usually in private single-engine aircraft) from their homes in the Central Valley to work in the Palo Alto area.

The nearest commercial airport is San Jose International Airport (SJC) (also known as Norman Mineta Airport), about 15 miles (24 km) southeast. Nearby is San Francisco International Airport (SFO), about 21 miles (34 km) north.

=== Rail ===
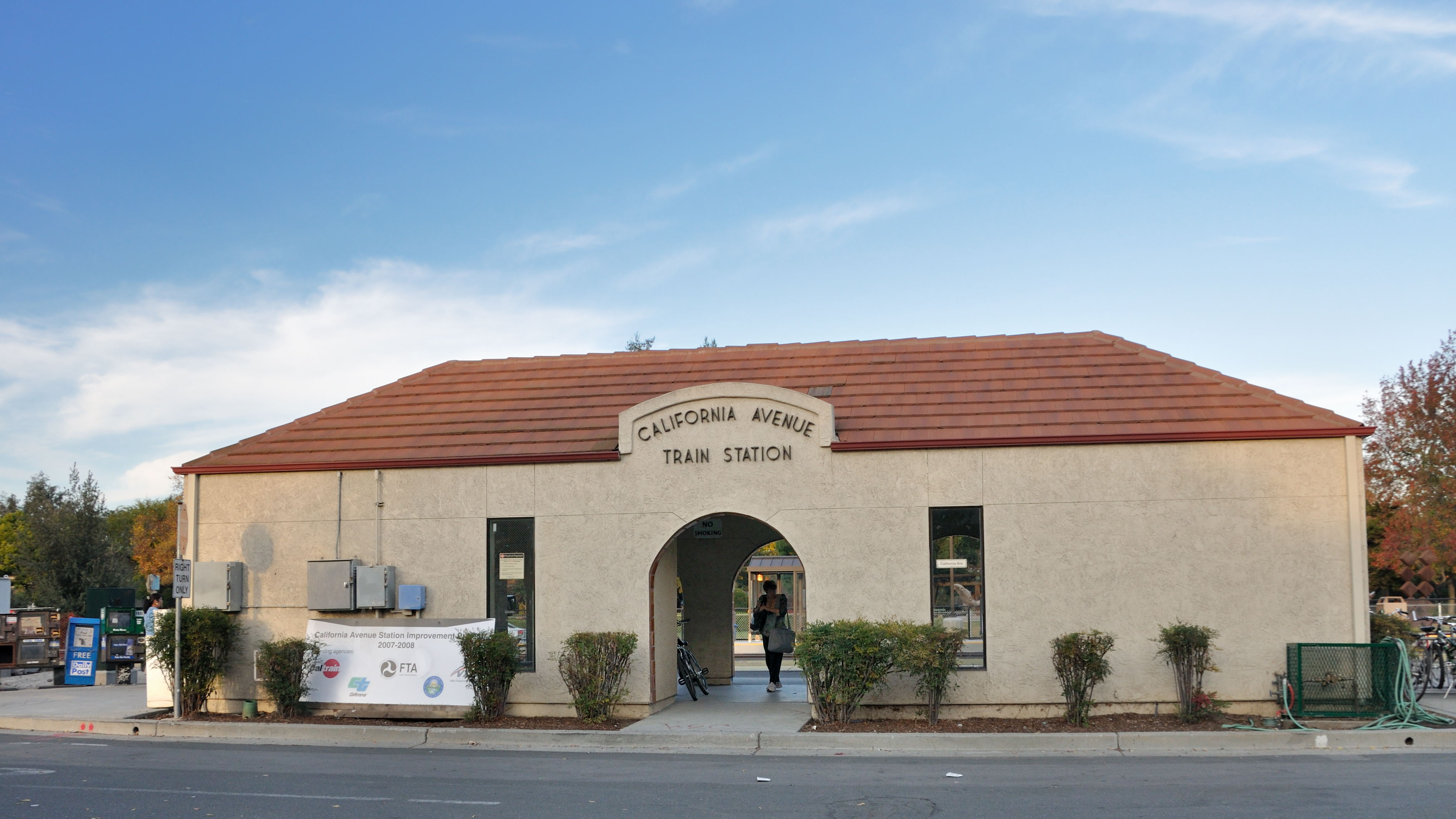
California Avenue Station

Passenger train service is provided exclusively by Caltrain, with service between San Francisco and San Jose, extending to Gilroy. Caltrain has two regular stations in Palo Alto, the main one at the Palo Alto Station in downtown Palo Alto (local, limited, and express). The main Palo Alto station is the second busiest (behind 4th and King in San Francisco) on the entire Caltrain line. The other station is located at California Avenue, (local and limited). A third, the Stanford station, located beside Alma Street at Embarcadero Road, is used for occasional sports events (generally football) at Stanford Stadium. Freight trains through Palo Alto are operated by Union Pacific (formerly Southern Pacific).

There are 4 grade crossings within city limits, at the intersections of Alma St, Churchill Ave, Meadow Dr, and Charleston Rd. The city has made plans upgrade the southern crossings and even proposed closing the Churchill Ave crossing completely to road traffic, but the project has been a hot-button issue for local residents and politicians for over a decade. The current proposed solution is elevating the tracks above grade, while lowering the roadway below grade. A subway tunnel underneath the right of way and converting the old track bed into a park was also proposed, but eventually dropped after it was deemed to be too costly and concerns over environmental impacts. Despite increased train service and Caltrain already installing Electric Service equipment on the mainline, Palo Alto has no green-lighted plans to address the crossings, except for immediate changes at Churchill Ave to address safety concerns at that intersection.

=== Bus ===
The Palo Alto Transit Center adjacent to the Palo Alto Train Station is the major bus hub for northern Santa Clara county. The Santa Clara Valley Transportation Authority (VTA) provides primary bus service through Palo Alto with service to the South Bay and Silicon Valley. San Mateo County Transit District (SamTrans) provides service to San Mateo County to the north but some lines include the Palo Alto Transit Center. The Stanford University Free Shuttle (Marguerite) provides a supplementary bus service between Stanford University and the Palo Alto Transit Center, and the Palo Alto Free Shuttle (Crosstown and Embarcadero), which circulates frequently, and provides service to major points in Palo Alto, including the main library, downtown, the Municipal Golf Course, the Palo Alto Transit Center, and both high schools. The Dumbarton Express is a weekday-only limited stop bus service that connects Union City BART in the East Bay to Palo Alto via the Dumbarton Bridge serving Stanford University, Stanford Research Park, Palo Alto Transit Center, and Veterans Hospital.

=== Cycling ===
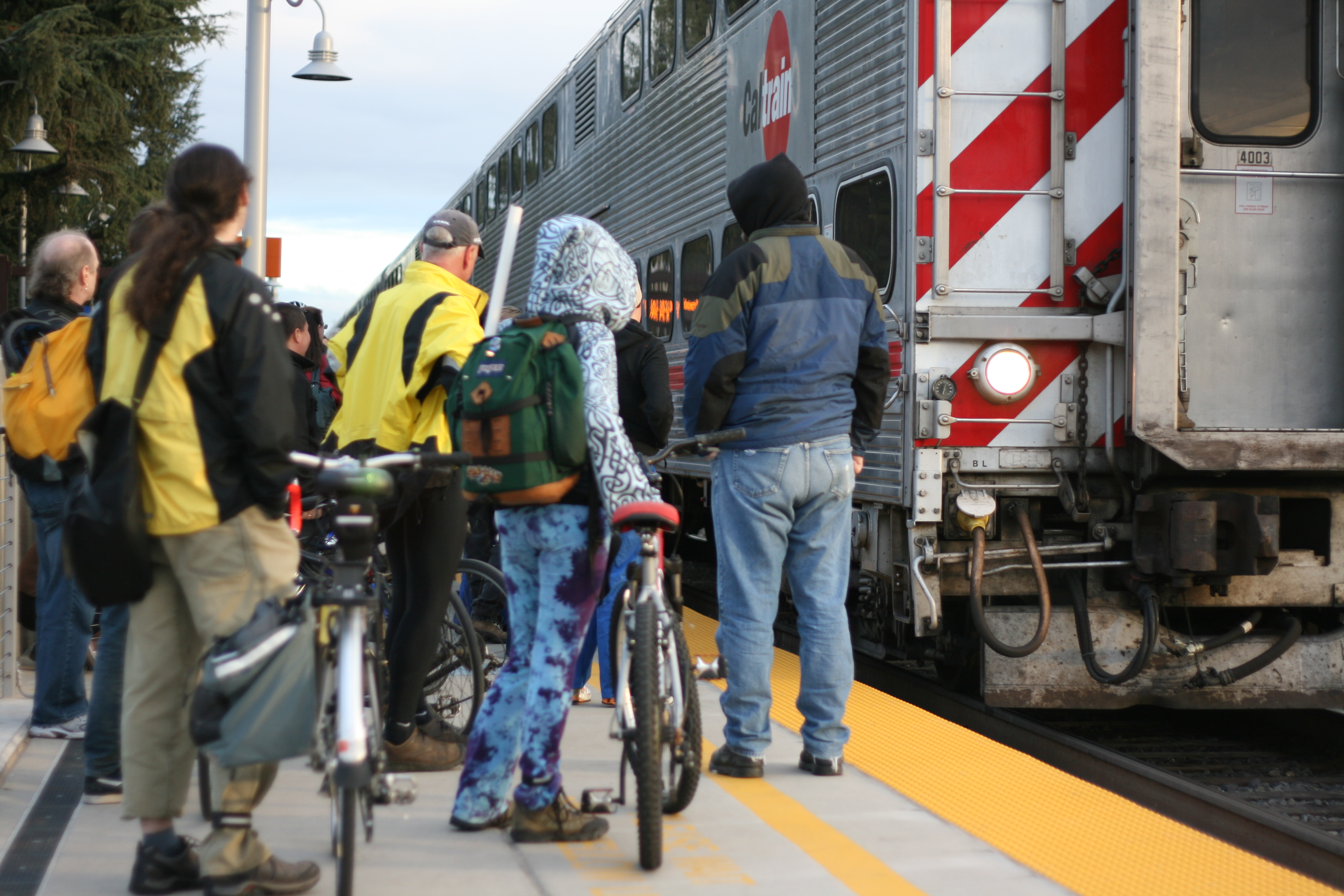
Commuters at Palo Alto Station boarding Caltrain

Cycling is a popular mode of transportation in Palo Alto. 9.5% of residents bicycle to work, the highest percentage of any city in the Bay Area, and third highest in the United States, after Davis, California and Boulder, Colorado. Since 2003, Palo Alto has received a Bicycle Friendly Community status of "Gold" from the League of American Bicyclists.

The city's flat terrain and many quiet tree-shaded residential streets offer comfort and safety to cyclists, and the temperate climate makes year-round cycling convenient. Palo Alto pioneered the bicycle boulevard concept in the early 1980s, enhancing residential Bryant Street to prioritize it for cyclists by removing stop signs, providing special traffic signals, and installing traffic diverters, and a bicycle/pedestrian bridge over Matadero Creek. El Camino Real, Alma Street, and Embarcadero and Middlefield roads, all identified as "high priorities" for adding bicycle lanes to improve safety by the 2003 Palo Alto Bicycle Transportation Plan, still contain no provisions for cyclists.

The Palo Alto Police Department decided to stop using tasers to detain bicyclists after a 2012 incident in which a 16-year-old boy, who had bicycled through a stop sign, was injured after police officers pursued him, fired a taser at him and suddenly braked their patrol car in front of him, causing the boy to crash.

=== Walking ===
Conditions for walking are excellent in Palo Alto except for crossing high-volume arterial streets such as El Camino Real and Oregon Expressway. Sidewalks are available on nearly every city street, with the notable exception of the Barron Park neighborhood, which was the last to be incorporated into the city. Palo Alto's Street grid is well-connected with few dead-end streets, especially in the city's older northern neighborhoods. An extensive urban forest, which is protected by the city's municipal code, provides shade and visual diversity, and slows motor vehicle traffic. 4.8% of residents walk to work.

=== Palo Alto Link ===
The city of Palo Alto created a rideshare service option called Palo Alto Link, and made its debut 2023. The rideshare service option provides service throughout the city, and has discounted fares for students and senior citizens. Funding for the project was provided by 2016 VTA Measure B and Bay Area Air Quality Transportation Fund for Clean Air. The program is administered by Nomad Transit, and has 10 vehicles in its fleet.

== Sister cities ==
Palo Alto has eight sister cities, as designated by Sister Cities International:

- Albi, Tarn, Occitanie, France, since 1994
- Linköping, Sweden, since 1987
- Oaxaca, Oaxaca, Mexico, since 1964
- Enschede, Overijssel, Netherlands, since 1980
- Palo, Philippines, since 1963
- Tsuchiura, Japan, since 2009
- Yangpu district of Shanghai, China since 2018
- Heidelberg, Germany, since 2017

The city also has a relationship via Sibling Cities USA with Bloomington, Indiana since 2022. In addition Narok in Kenya is a friendship city, a less formal shorter term relationship which started in 2025.

In 1989, Palo Alto received a gift of a large, whimsical wooden sculpture called Foreign Friends (Fjärran Vänner)—of a man, woman, dog and bird sitting on a park bench—from Linköping. The sculpture was praised by some, called "grotesque" by others, and became a lightning rod for vandals. It was covered with a large, addressed postcard marked "Return to Sender." A former Stanford University professor was arrested for attempting to light it on fire. It was also doused with paint. When the original heads were decapitated on Halloween, 1993, the statue became a shrine—flowers bouquets and cards were placed upon it. Following an anonymous donation, the heads were restored. Within weeks, the restored heads were decapitated again, this time disappearing. The heads were eventually replaced with new ones, which generated even more distaste, as many deemed the new heads even less attractive.

A few months later, the man's arm was chopped off, the woman's lap was vandalized, the bird was stolen, and the replacements heads were decapitated and stolen. The sculpture was removed from its location on Embarcadero Road and Waverley Avenue in 1995, dismantled, and placed in storage until it was destroyed in 2000. Ironically, the statue was designed not as a lasting work of art, but as something to be climbed on with a lifespan of 10 to 25 years.

== Notable buildings and other points of interest ==
=== Historical buildings and architecture ===
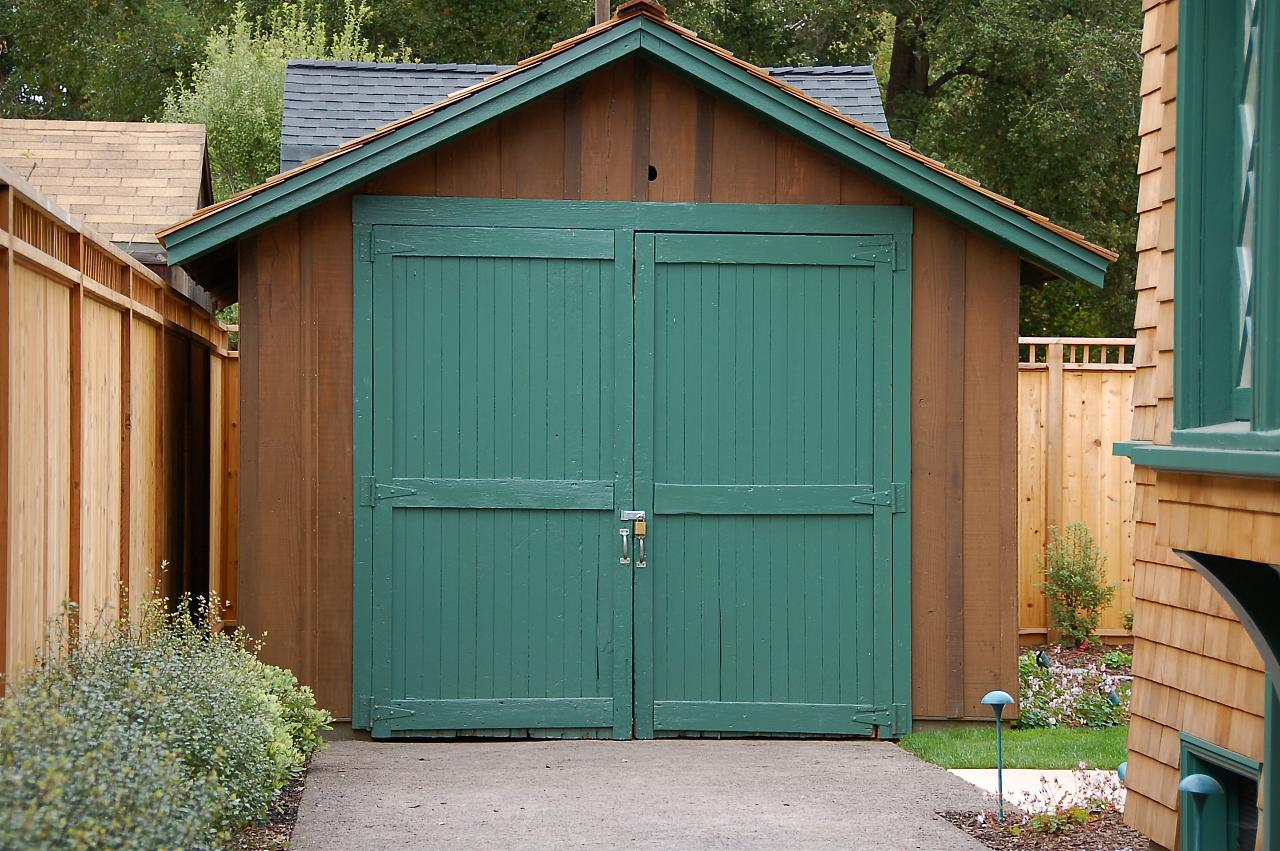
Packard's garage

- Frenchman's Tower was built in 1876
- Former Palo Alto Community House, at the intersection of University Avenue and El Camino Real; designed by Julia Morgan as the YWCA Hostess House but first used as a social centre in Camp Fremont during World War I; now a restaurant, MacArthur Park.
- Lou Henry Hoover Girl Scout House, "the oldest scout meeting house remaining in continuous use in the United States".
- Packard's garage where the company Hewlett-Packard was started in 1939.
- Printers Inc. Bookstore, now defunct, was a landmark independent bookstore on California Ave. and was referenced in Vikram Seth's novel, The Golden Gate. It closed in 2001.
- Ramona Street Architectural District one block of downtown office buildings and restaurants designed and built by Pedro Joseph de Lemos
- Saint Thomas Aquinas Church is the oldest church in Palo Alto.
- Woman's Club of Palo Alto was built in 1916 in a Tudor-Craftsman style, listed in 2014 in the National Register of Historic Places.

=== Nature and hiking ===
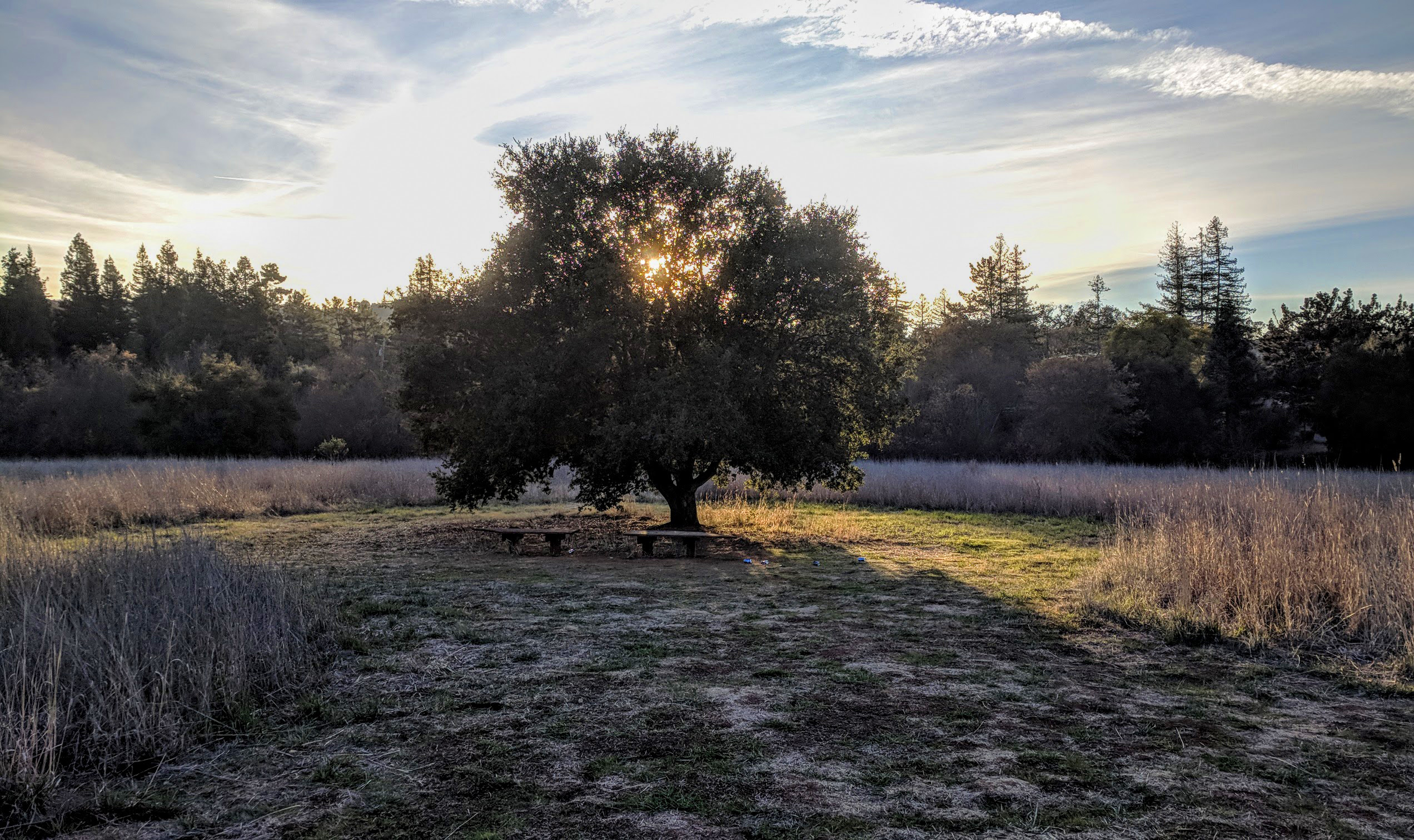
Oak tree at Esther Clark Park in Palo Alto

- Arastradero Preserve
- Elizabeth F. Gamble Garden, public botanical garden
- Esther Clark Park, a small open oak/grassland park connecting to Los Altos Hills
- Foothills Nature Preserve
- Palo Alto Baylands Nature Preserve

=== Museums, art, and entertainment ===
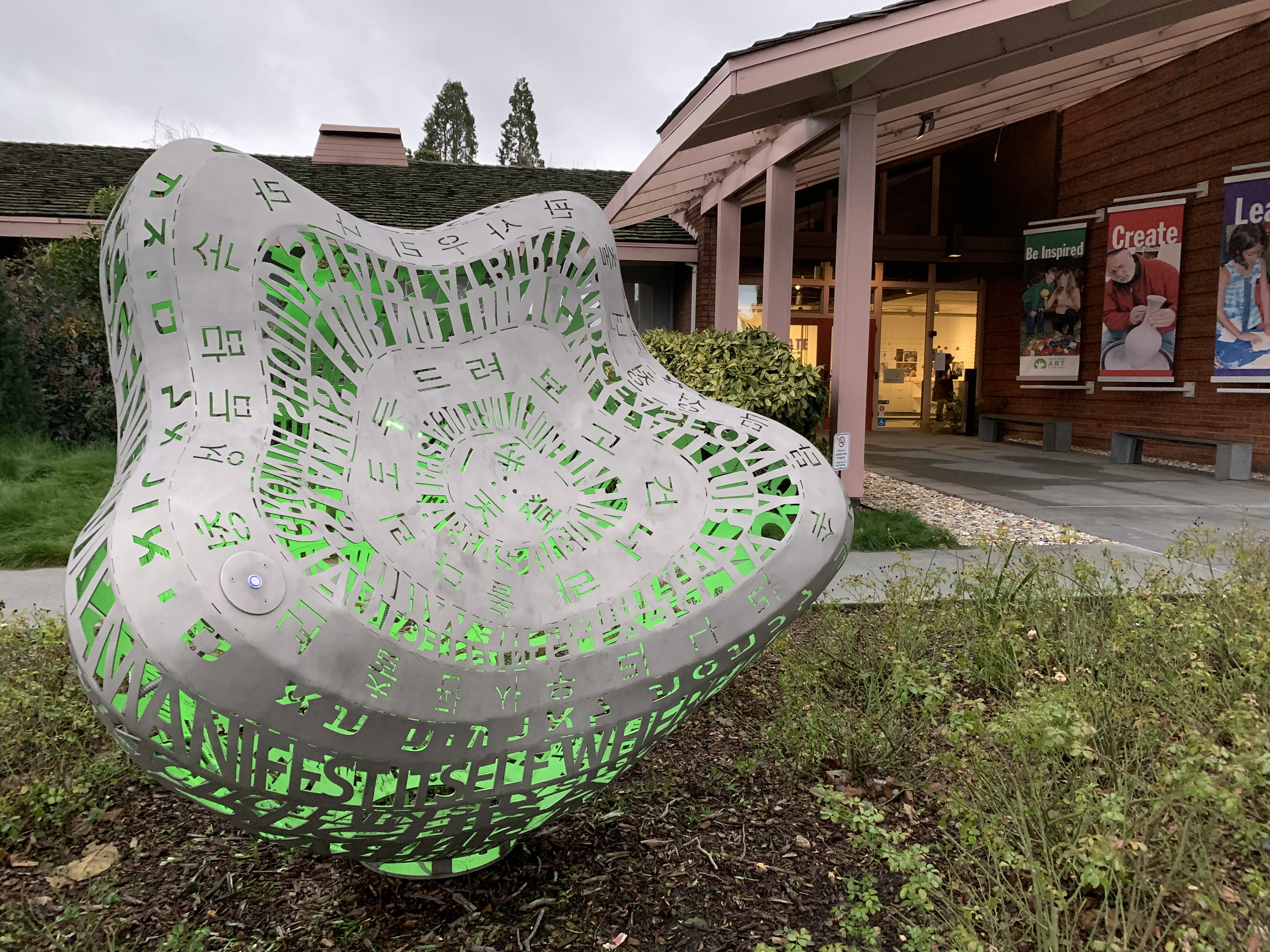
The entrance to the Palo Alto Art Center

- Palo Alto Art Center
- Pacific Art League
- Stanford Shopping Center
- University Avenue (Downtown Palo Alto)
- Palo Alto Children's Theatre
- Palo Alto Players
- Stanford Theatre
- Palo Alto Junior Museum and Zoo
- The Foster Museum
- The Crows Project: You-Me-We
- Winter Lodge Ice Skating Rink

== See also ==
- List of cities and towns in California
- List of cities and towns in the San Francisco Bay Area
- List of people from Palo Alto
- Mayfield Brewery
