= The Crows Project: You-Me-We =

Sculpture in California

- Artist: Sylvi Herrick
- Year: 2019
- Subject: American crow
- Dimensions: 7 ft (2.1 m) tall
- Weight: 350–400 lb (160–180 kg) each
- Location: Palo Alto, California; 37.4555°N 122.1510°W

The Crows Project: You-Me-We, is a public sculpture in Palo Alto, California, created by Sylvi Herrick. It is located at 1150 University Ave and consists of three 7 ft (2.1 m) tall sculptures of American crows; one is sitting on top of a household, while the other two are on the front lawn.

== History ==
Sylvia Herrick built The Crows Project in early 2019, taking inspiration from the Palo Alto and Menlo Park area and the multitude of crows there. She interprets the common negative connotation of crows to them being very intelligent and being able to form connections. Herrick created the crows in St. Augustine, Florida, and wanted to go on a road trip with it to share her art with different people and display it in a more fluid environment. She wanted to explore the Mexico-United States border and displayed them in New Orleans, Austin, Texas, Marfa, Texas, and El Paso, Texas. Herrick especially wanted to stop near El Paso to learn more about borders and human migration, as it is right on the countries' border and many people commute through it daily. Herrick ended her road trip at her studio in Palo Alto, saying that the Bay Area was an important cultural crossroads. She placed the art on her mother's house.
