= Ordughesh =

Village in Razavi Khorasan province, Iran

Ordughesh Persian: اردوغش
- Village
- Location within Iran
- Coordinates: 36°08′30″N 58°58′12″E
- Country: Iran
- Province: Razavi Khorasan
- County: Zeberkhan
- District: Central
- Rural District: Ordughesh

Population (2016)
  - Total: 1,914
- Time zone: UTC+3:30 (IRST)

Ordughesh (Persian: اردوغش) (Note: Also romanized as Ardūghesh, Erdūghesh, and Ordūghesh) is a village in, and the capital of, Ordughesh Rural District in the Central District of Zeberkhan County, Razavi Khorasan province, Iran. The previous capital of the rural district was the village of Sahel Borj, now a neighborhood in the city of Kharv.

== Demographics ==
=== Population ===
At the time of the 2006 National Census, the village's population was 1,476 in 374 households, when it was in the former Zeberkhan District of Nishapur County. The following census in 2011 counted 1,600 people in 476 households. The 2016 census measured the population of the village as 1,914 people in 615 households, the most populous in its rural district.

In 2020, the district was separated from the county in the establishment of Zeberkhan County, and the rural district was transferred to the new Central District.
