= Jafarabad, Zeberkhan =

Neighborhood in Razavi Khorasan province, Iran

Jafarabad Persian: جعفراباد
- Neighborhood
- Location within Iran
- Coordinates: 36°08′06″N 59°07′12″E
- Country: Iran
- Province: Razavi Khorasan
- County: Zeberkhan
- District: Central
- City: Darrud

Population (2006)
  - Total: 123
- Time zone: UTC+3:30 (IRST)

Jafarabad (Persian: جعفراباد) (Note: Also romanized as Ja‘farābād; also known as Jū Kārīz (جو كاريز)) is a neighborhood in city of Darrud in the Central District of Zeberkhan County, Razavi Khorasan province, Iran.

== Demographics ==
=== Population ===
At the time of the 2006 National Census, Jafarabad's population was 123 in 31 households, when it was a village in Zeberkhan Rural District of the former Zeberkhan District in Nishapur County.

After the census, the village was annexed by the city of Darrud. In 2020, the district was separated from the county in the establishment of Zeberkhan County, and the rural district was transferred to the new Central District.
