= Dizbad-e Olya =

Village in Razavi Khorasan province, Iran

Dizbad-e Olya Persian: دیزباد علیا
- Village
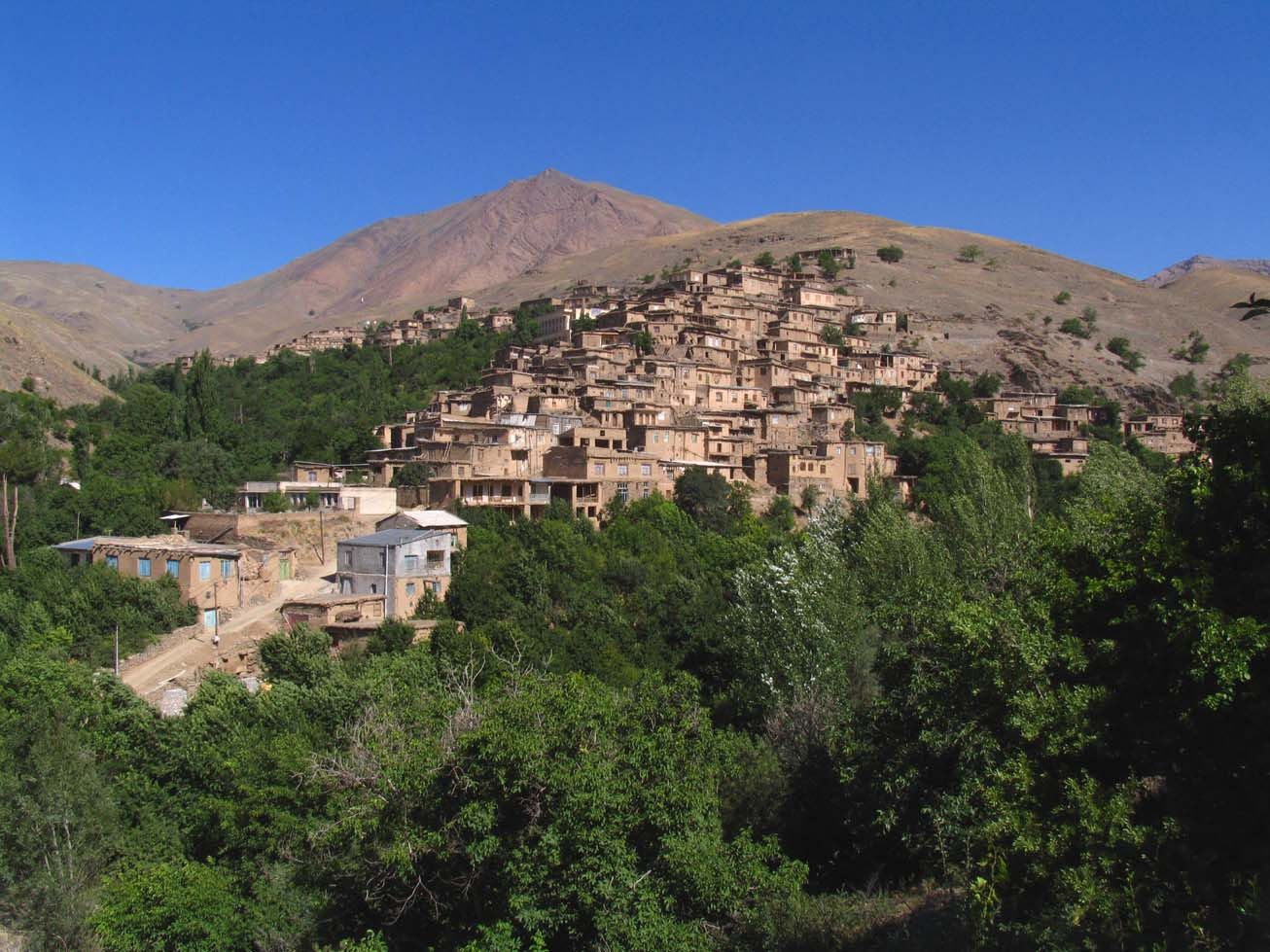
- The village of Dizbad-e Olya

- Location within Iran
- Coordinates: 36°06′07″N 59°16′55″E
- Country: Iran
- Province: Razavi Khorasan
- County: Zeberkhan
- District: Central
- Rural District: Zeberkhan
- Elevation: 2,020 m (6,630 ft)

Population (2016)
  - Total: 910
- Time zone: UTC+3:30 (IRST)
- Area code: 552
- Website: www.adelweb.ir

Dizbad-e Olya (Persian: دیزباد علیا) (Note: Also romanized as Dīzbād-e ‘Olyā; also known as Dizbad and Dīzbād-e Bālā) is a village in Zeberkhan Rural District of the Central District in Zeberkhan County, Razavi Khorasan province, Iran.

== History ==
The historical background of Dizbad dates back to the year 714 AD. The name has changed many times throughout history. The oldest known name of Dizbad is Aspiduz (اسپیدوز), which includes the Persian words for horse and fort.

In the ninth century it was known as Qasr al-Rih (Arabic: قصر الریح) due to the Arab invasion. The origin of this name is due to the three forts that once served as a defense system, they signalled by smoke signals when enemies tried to invade. Only ruins of these forts remain. In later times, Dizbad was known as Chehel Ashkub (Persian: چهل اشکوب).

Due to its long history and cultural background, the identity of the people in this area has undergone many changes. One of the most impactful events that caused this cultural change was the opening of the Naser Khosrow School in 1939. The establishment of this school encouraged families to send their children to school, which had a positive effect and resulted in a growing number of children from the village graduating from school.

== Demographics ==
=== Population ===
At the time of the 2006 National Census, the village's population was 243 in 123 households, when it was in the former Zeberkhan District of Nishapur County. The following census in 2011 counted 635 people in 241 households. The 2016 census measured the population of the village as 910 people in 310 households.

In 2020, the district was separated from the county in the establishment of Zeberkhan County, and the rural district was transferred to the new Central District.

== Geography ==
Dizbad-e Olya is located at an altitude of 2,020 metres in the southern area of the Binalud Mountains 97 kilometres southwest of the city of Mashhad and 71 kilometres northwest of Neyshabur. The highest point in the area is Mount Qajqor at 2881 m above sea level. The area of Dizbad-e Olya also borders the two neighbouring villages of Qasemabad and Hesar.

== Gallery ==
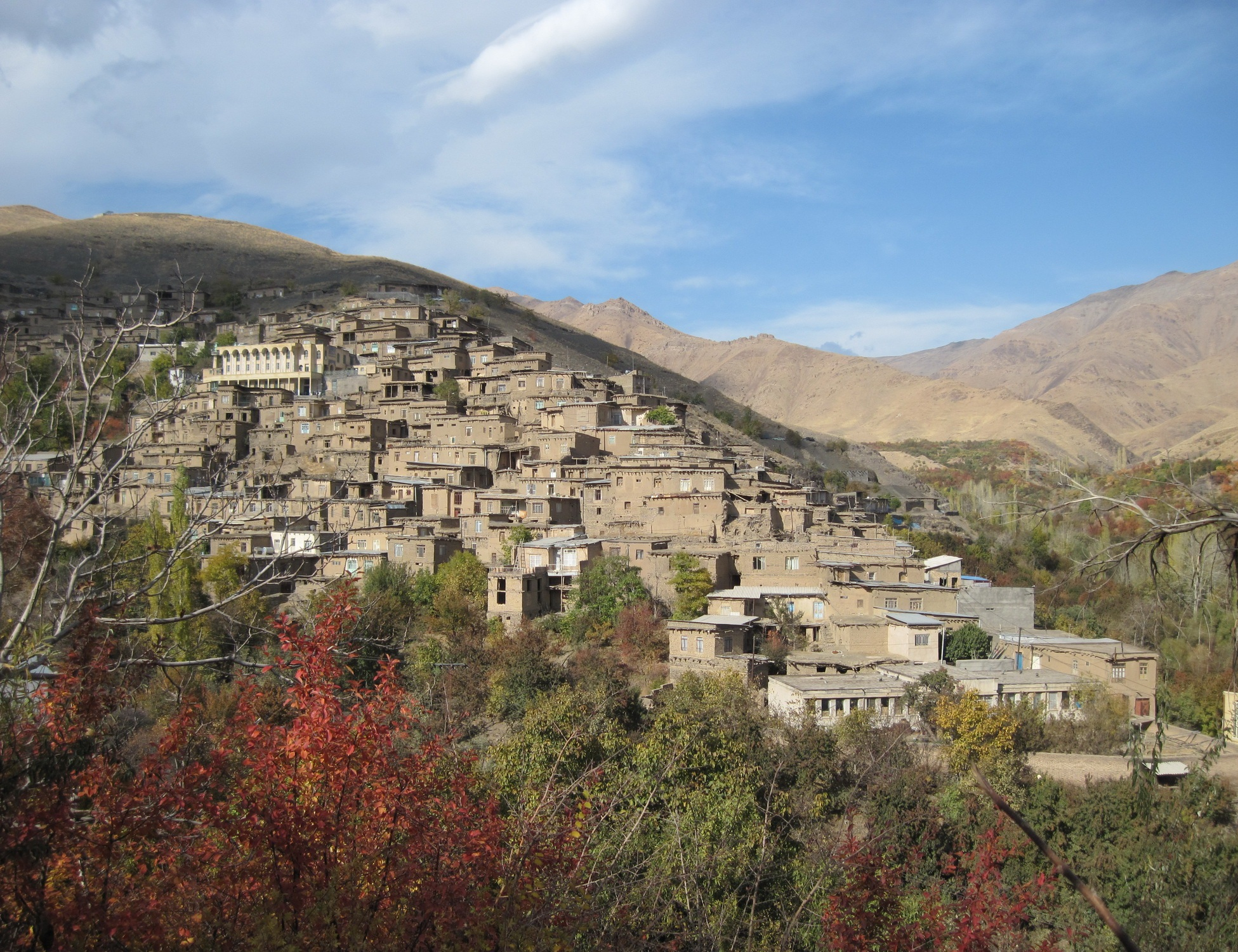

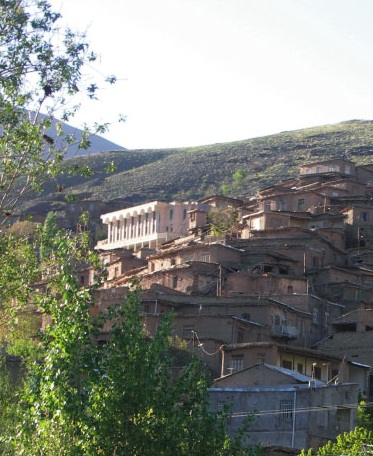
Jama'at Khana Dizbad

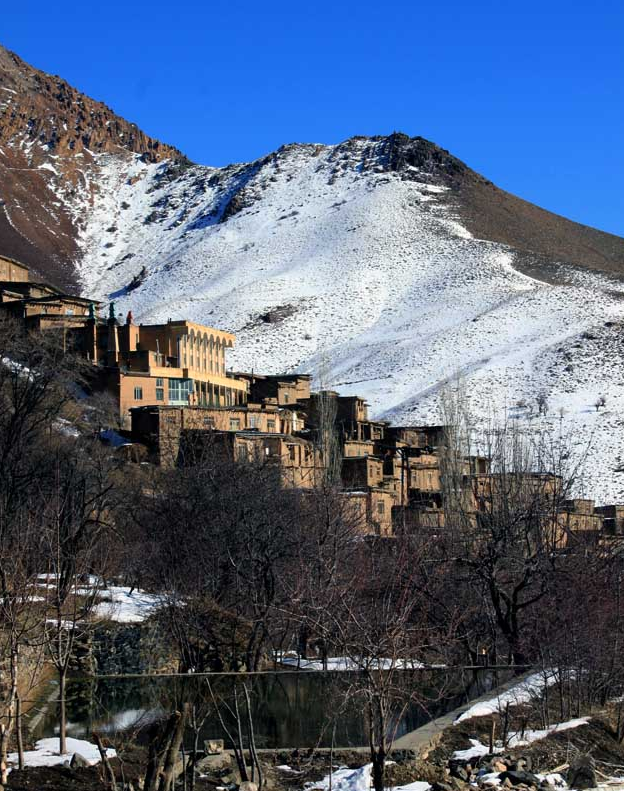

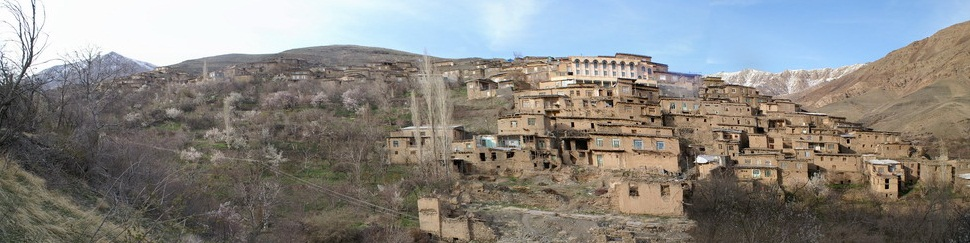

== See also ==
Media related to Dizbad-e Olya at Wikimedia Commons
