= Kariz-e Now =

Kariz-e Now or Kariz Now or Kariz-i-Nau (Persian: كاريزنو) may refer to:

- Kariz-e Now, Fariman, Razavi Khorasan Province
- Kariz-e Now, Ordughesh, Nishapur County, Razavi Khorasan Province
- Kariz-e Now, Zeberkhan, Nishapur County, Razavi Khorasan Province
- Kariz-e Now, Nasrabad, Torbat-e Jam County, Razavi Khorasan Province
- Kariz Now, Salehabad, Torbat-e Jam County, Razavi Khorasan Province
- Kariz Now-e Sofla, Torbat-e Jam County, Razavi Khorasan Province
- Kariz-e Now, South Khorasan
