= Kalateh-ye Saru =

Village in Razavi Khorasan province, Iran

Kalateh-ye Saru Persian: كلاته سرو
- Village
- Country: Iran
- Province: Razavi Khorasan
- County: Zeberkhan
- District: Central
- Rural District: Zeberkhan

Population (2016)
  - Total: 0
- Time zone: UTC+3:30 (IRST)

Kalateh-ye Saru (Persian: كلاته سرو) (Note: Also romanized as Kalāteh-ye Sarū) is a village in Zeberkhan Rural District of the Central District in Zeberkhan County, Razavi Khorasan province, Iran.

== Demographics ==
=== Population ===
At the time of the 2006 National Census, the village's population was 47 in nine households, when it was in the former Zeberkhan District of Nishapur County. The village did not appear in the following census of 2011. The 2016 census measured the population of the village as zero.

In 2020, the district was separated from the county in the establishment of Zeberkhan County, and the rural district was transferred to the new Central District.
