= Sakhdar =

Village in Razavi Khorasan province, Iran

Sakhdar Persian: سخدر
- Village
- Location within Iran
- Coordinates: 36°06′44″N 59°05′13″E
- Country: Iran
- Province: Razavi Khorasan
- County: Zeberkhan
- District: Central
- Rural District: Zeberkhan

Population (2016)
  - Total: 339
- Time zone: UTC+3:30 (IRST)

Sakhdar (Persian: سخدر) is a village in Zeberkhan Rural District of the Central District in Zeberkhan County, Razavi Khorasan province, Iran.

== Demographics ==
=== Population ===
At the time of the 2006 National Census, the village's population was 381 in 117 households, when it was in the former Zeberkhan District of Nishapur County. The following census in 2011 counted 326 people in 115 households. The 2016 census measured the population of the village as 339 people in 120 households.

In 2020, the district was separated from the county in the establishment of Zeberkhan County, and the rural district was transferred to the new Central District.
