= Kalateh-ye Soltani =

Village in Razavi Khorasan province, Iran

Kalateh-ye Soltani Persian: كلاته سلطاني
- Village
- Location within Iran
- Coordinates: 36°07′58″N 59°04′49″E
- Country: Iran
- Province: Razavi Khorasan
- County: Zeberkhan
- District: Central
- Rural District: Zeberkhan

Population (2016)
  - Total: 126
- Time zone: UTC+3:30 (IRST)

Kalateh-ye Soltani (Persian: كلاته سلطاني) (Note: Also romanized as Kalāteh-ye Solţānī; also known as Kalāteh-ye Solţān) is a village in Zeberkhan Rural District of the Central District in Zeberkhan County, Razavi Khorasan province, Iran.

== Demographics ==
=== Population ===
At the time of the 2006 National Census, the village's population was 129 in 36 households, when it was in the former Zeberkhan District of Nishapur County. The following census in 2011 counted 127 people in 40 households. The 2016 census measured the population of the village as 126 people in 42 households.

In 2020, the district was separated from the county in the establishment of Zeberkhan County, and the rural district was transferred to the new Central District.
