= Kalateh-ye Luyedani =

Village in Razavi Khorasan province, Iran

Kalateh-ye Luyedani Persian: كلاته لويداني
- Village
- Country: Iran
- Province: Razavi Khorasan
- County: Zeberkhan
- District: Central
- Rural District: Zeberkhan

Population (2016)
  - Total: 53
- Time zone: UTC+3:30 (IRST)

Kalateh-ye Luyedani (Persian: كلاته لويداني) (Note: Also romanized as Kalāteh-ye Lūyedānī) is a village in Zeberkhan Rural District of the Central District in Zeberkhan County, Razavi Khorasan province, Iran.

== Demographics ==
=== Population ===
At the time of the 2006 National Census, the village's population was 58 in 14 households, when it was in the former Zeberkhan District of Nishapur County. The following census in 2011 counted 49 people in 13 households. The 2016 census measured the population of the village as 53 people in 16 households.

In 2020, the district was separated from the county in the establishment of Zeberkhan County, and the rural district was transferred to the new Central District.
