= Darudbakht =

Village in Razavi Khorasan province, Iran

Darudbakht Persian: درودبخت
- Village
- Country: Iran
- Province: Razavi Khorasan
- County: Zeberkhan
- District: Central
- Rural District: Zeberkhan

Population (2016)
  - Total: Below reporting threshold
- Time zone: UTC+3:30 (IRST)

Darudbakht (Persian: درودبخت) (Note: Also romanized as Darūdbakht) is a village in Zeberkhan Rural District of the Central District in Zeberkhan County, Razavi Khorasan province, Iran.

== Demographics ==
=== Population ===
At the time of the 2006 National Census, the village's population was 31 in nine households, when it was in the former Zeberkhan District of Nishapur County. The following census in 2011 counted 37 people in 14 households. The 2016 census measured the population of the village as below the reporting threshold.

In 2020, the district was separated from the county in the establishment of Zeberkhan County, and the rural district was transferred to the new Central District.
