= Khosrowabad, Zeberkhan =

Village in Razavi Khorasan province, Iran

Khosrowabad Persian: خسرواباد
- Village
- Location within Iran
- Country: Iran
- Province: Razavi Khorasan
- County: Zeberkhan
- District: Central
- Rural District: Ordughesh

Population (2016)
  - Total: 51
- Time zone: UTC+3:30 (IRST)

Khosrowabad (Persian: خسرواباد) (Note: Also romanized as Khosrowābād; also known as Khosrowābād-e Amīrī) is a village in Ordughesh Rural District of the Central District in Zeberkhan County, Razavi Khorasan province, Iran.

== Demographics ==
=== Population ===
At the time of the 2006 National Census, the village's population was 92 in 20 households, when it was in the former Zeberkhan District of Nishapur County. The following census in 2011 counted 92 people in 26 households. The 2016 census measured the population of the village as 51 people in 14 households.

In 2020, the district was separated from the county in the establishment of Zeberkhan County, and the rural district was transferred to the new Central District.
