= Karimabad, Zeberkhan =

Village in Razavi Khorasan province, Iran

Karimabad Persian: كريم اباد
- Village
- Location within Iran
- Coordinates: 36°05′18″N 58°59′21″E
- Country: Iran
- Province: Razavi Khorasan
- County: Zeberkhan
- District: Central
- Rural District: Ordughesh

Population (2016)
  - Total: 217
- Time zone: UTC+3:30 (IRST)

Karimabad (Persian: كريم اباد) (Note: Also romanized as Karīmābād) is a village in Ordughesh Rural District of the Central District in Zeberkhan County, Razavi Khorasan province, Iran.

== Demographics ==
=== Population ===
At the time of the 2006 National Census, the village's population was 182 in 43 households, when it was in the former Zeberkhan District of Nishapur County. The following census in 2011 counted 200 people in 57 households. The 2016 census measured the population of the village as 217 people in 66 households.

In 2020, the district was separated from the county in the establishment of Zeberkhan County, and the rural district was transferred to the new Central District.
