= Baghshan =

Village in Razavi Khorasan province, Iran

Baghshan Persian: باغشن
- Village
- Location within Iran
- Coordinates: 36°04′41″N 59°06′36″E
- Country: Iran
- Province: Razavi Khorasan
- County: Zeberkhan
- District: Central
- Rural District: Zeberkhan

Population (2016)
  - Total: 3,127
- Time zone: UTC+3:30 (IRST)

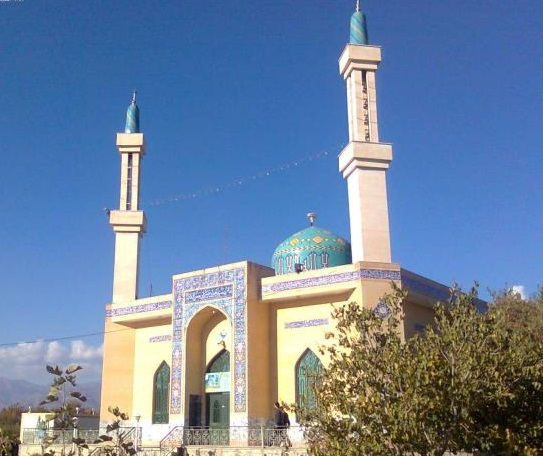
Baghshan Mosque in Nishapur

Baghshan (Persian: باغشن) (Note: Also romanized as Bagh Shan and Bāgh Shan (بغ شن)) is a village in Zeberkhan Rural District of the Central District in Zeberkhan County, Razavi Khorasan province, Iran.

== Demographics ==
=== Population ===
At the time of the 2006 National Census, the village's population was 2,769 in 797 households, when it was in the former Zeberkhan District of Nishapur County. The following census in 2011 counted 2,958 people in 940 households. The 2016 census measured the population of the village as 3,127 people in 992 households, the most populous in its rural district.

In 2020, the district was separated from the county in the establishment of Zeberkhan County, and the rural district was transferred to the new Central District.
