= Khorram Beyk, Zeberkhan =

Village in Razavi Khorasan province, Iran

Khorram Beyk Persian: خرم بيك
- Village
- Location within Iran
- Coordinates: 36°08′03″N 59°05′16″E
- Country: Iran
- Province: Razavi Khorasan
- County: Zeberkhan
- District: Central
- Rural District: Zeberkhan

Population (2016)
  - Total: 212
- Time zone: UTC+3:30 (IRST)

Khorram Beyk (Persian: خرم بيك) (Note: Also romanized as Khorombeyk; also known as Khorombak) is a village in Zeberkhan Rural District of the Central District in Zeberkhan County, Razavi Khorasan province, Iran.

== Demographics ==
=== Population ===
At the time of the 2006 National Census, the village's population was 160 in 43 households, when it was in the former Zeberkhan District of Nishapur County. The following census in 2011 counted 219 people in 59 households. The 2016 census measured the population of the village as 212 people in 61 households.

In 2020, the district was separated from the county in the establishment of Zeberkhan County, and the rural district was transferred to the new Central District.
