= Buzh Mehran =

Village in Razavi Khorasan province, Iran

Buzh Mehran Persian: بوژمهران
- Village
- Location within Iran
- Coordinates: 36°10′11″N 58°58′42″E
- Country: Iran
- Province: Razavi Khorasan
- County: Zeberkhan
- District: Central
- Rural District: Ordughesh

Population (2016)
  - Total: 1,672
- Time zone: UTC+3:30 (IRST)

Buzh Mehran (Persian: بوژمهران) (Note: Also romanized as Būzh Mehrān and Būzhmehrān) is a village in Ordughesh Rural District of the Central District in Zeberkhan County, Razavi Khorasan province, Iran.

== Demographics ==
=== Population ===
At the time of the 2006 National Census, the village's population was 1,744 in 477 households, when it was in the former Zeberkhan District of Nishapur County. The following census in 2011 counted 1,683 people in 539 households. The 2016 census measured the population of the village as 1,672 people in 559 households.

In 2020, the district was separated from the county in the establishment of Zeberkhan County, and the rural district was transferred to the new Central District.
