= Mohsenabad, Zeberkhan =

Village in Razavi Khorasan province, Iran

Mohsenabad Persian: محسن اباد
- Village
- Location within Iran
- Coordinates: 36°07′22″N 58°57′58″E
- Country: Iran
- Province: Razavi Khorasan
- County: Zeberkhan
- District: Central
- Rural District: Ordughesh

Population (2016)
  - Total: 693
- Time zone: UTC+3:30 (IRST)

Mohsenabad (Persian: محسن اباد) (Note: Also romanized as Moḩsenābād)) is a village in Ordughesh Rural District of the Central District in Zeberkhan County, Razavi Khorasan province, Iran.

== Demographics ==
=== Population ===
At the time of the 2006 National Census, the village's population was 850 in 220 households, when it was in the former Zeberkhan District of Nishapur County. The following census in 2011 counted 936 people in 287 households. The 2016 census measured the population of the village as 693 people in 299 households.

In 2020, the district was separated from the county in the establishment of Zeberkhan County, and the rural district was transferred to the new Central District.
