= Baz-e Heydar =

Village in Razavi Khorasan province, Iran

Baz-e Heydar Persian: بازحيدر
- Village
- Location within Iran
- Coordinates: 36°02′49″N 59°12′28″E
- Country: Iran
- Province: Razavi Khorasan
- County: Zeberkhan
- District: Central
- Rural District: Zeberkhan

Population (2016)
  - Total: 108
- Time zone: UTC+3:30 (IRST)

Baz-e Heydar (Persian: بازحيدر) (Note: Also romanized as Bāz-e Ḩeydar; also known as Bār-e Ḩeydar) is a village in Zeberkhan Rural District of the Central District in Zeberkhan County, Razavi Khorasan province, Iran.

== Demographics ==
=== Population ===
At the time of the 2006 National Census, the village's population was 109 in 35 households, when it was in the former Zeberkhan District of Nishapur County. The following census in 2011 counted 95 people in 35 households. The 2016 census measured the population of the village as 108 people in 45 households.

In 2020, the district was separated from the county in the establishment of Zeberkhan County, and the rural district was transferred to the new Central District.
