= Deh Now-ye Hashemabad =

Village in Razavi Khorasan province, Iran

Deh Now-ye Hashemabad Persian: دهنوهاشم اباد
- Village
- Location within Iran
- Coordinates: 36°05′09″N 58°59′43″E
- Country: Iran
- Province: Razavi Khorasan
- County: Zeberkhan
- District: Central
- Rural District: Ordughesh

Population (2016)
  - Total: 369
- Time zone: UTC+3:30 (IRST)

Deh Now-ye Hashemabad (Persian: دهنوهاشم اباد) (Note: Also romanized as Deh Now-ye Hāshemābād; also known as Deh Now-ye Hāshem (دهنوهاشم) and Hāshemābād) is a village in Ordughesh Rural District of the Central District in Zeberkhan County, Razavi Khorasan province, Iran.

== Demographics ==
=== Population ===
At the time of the 2006 National Census, the village's population was 170 in 42 households, when it was in the former Zeberkhan District of Nishapur County. The following census in 2011 counted 225 people in 65 households. The 2016 census measured the population of the village as 369 people in 111 households.

In 2020, the district was separated from the county in the establishment of Zeberkhan County, and the rural district was transferred to the new Central District.
