= Javadiyeh, Zeberkhan =

Village in Razavi Khorasan province, Iran

Javadiyeh Persian: جواديه
- Village
- Location within Iran
- Coordinates: 36°02′25″N 59°08′44″E
- Country: Iran
- Province: Razavi Khorasan
- County: Zeberkhan
- District: Central
- Rural District: Zeberkhan

Population (2016)
  - Total: 266
- Time zone: UTC+3:30 (IRST)

Javadiyeh (Persian: جواديه) (Note: Also romanized as Javādīyeh) is a village in Zeberkhan Rural District of the Central District in Zeberkhan County, Razavi Khorasan province, Iran.

== Demographics ==
=== Population ===
At the time of the 2006 National Census, the village's population was 319 in 77 households, when it was in the former Zeberkhan District of Nishapur County. The following census in 2011 counted 350 people in 100 households. The 2016 census measured the population of the village as 266 people in 92 households.

In 2020, the district was separated from the county in the establishment of Zeberkhan County, and the rural district was transferred to the new Central District.
