= Qareh Beyk =

Village in Razavi Khorasan province, Iran

Qareh Beyk Persian: قره بيك
- Village
- Location within Iran
- Coordinates: 36°08′21″N 59°04′28″E
- Country: Iran
- Province: Razavi Khorasan
- County: Zeberkhan
- District: Central
- Rural District: Zeberkhan

Population (2016)
  - Total: 88
- Time zone: UTC+3:30 (IRST)

Qareh Beyk (Persian: قره بيك) is a village in Zeberkhan Rural District of the Central District in Zeberkhan County, Razavi Khorasan province, Iran.

== Demographics ==
=== Population ===
At the time of the 2006 National Census, the village's population was 69 in 22 households, when it was in the former Zeberkhan District of Nishapur County. The following census in 2011 counted 85 people in 30 households. The 2016 census measured the population of the village as 88 people in 33 households.

In 2020, the district was separated from the county in the establishment of Zeberkhan County, and the rural district was transferred to the new Central District.
