= Qarah Dash, Razavi Khorasan =

Village in Razavi Khorasan province, Iran

Qarah Dash Persian: قره داش
- Village
- Location within Iran
- Coordinates: 36°04′25″N 59°05′06″E
- Country: Iran
- Province: Razavi Khorasan
- County: Zeberkhan
- District: Central
- Rural District: Zeberkhan

Population (2016)
  - Total: 276
- Time zone: UTC+3:30 (IRST)

Qarah Dash (Persian: قره داش) (Note: Also romanized as Qarah Dāsh and Qareh Dāsh) is a village in Zeberkhan Rural District of the Central District in Zeberkhan County, Razavi Khorasan province, Iran.

== Demographics ==
=== Population ===
At the time of the 2006 National Census, the village's population was 282 in 70 households, when it was in the former Zeberkhan District of Nishapur County. The following census in 2011 counted 283 people in 84 households. The 2016 census measured the population of the village as 276 people in 90 households.

In 2020, the district was separated from the county in the establishment of Zeberkhan County, and the rural district was transferred to the new Central District.
