= Kazemabad, Zeberkhan =

Village in Razavi Khorasan province, Iran

Kazemabad Persian: كاظم اباد
- Village
- Location within Iran
- Coordinates: 36°07′34″N 58°56′55″E
- Country: Iran
- Province: Razavi Khorasan
- County: Zeberkhan
- District: Central
- Rural District: Ordughesh

Population (2016)
  - Total: 24
- Time zone: UTC+3:30 (IRST)

Kazemabad (Persian: كاظم اباد) (Note: Also romanized as Kāz̧emābād) is a village in Ordughesh Rural District of the Central District in Zeberkhan County, Razavi Khorasan province, Iran.

== Demographics ==
=== Population ===
At the time of the 2006 National Census, the village's population was 25 in five households, when it was in the former Zeberkhan District of Nishapur County. The following census in 2011 counted 13 people in five households. The 2016 census measured the population of the village as 24 people in eight households.

In 2020, the district was separated from the county in the establishment of Zeberkhan County, and the rural district was transferred to the new Central District.
