= Chenaran, Zeberkhan =

Village in Razavi Khorasan province, Iran

Chenaran Persian: چناران
- Village
- Location within Iran
- Coordinates: 36°06′14″N 59°10′23″E
- Country: Iran
- Province: Razavi Khorasan
- County: Zeberkhan
- District: Central
- Rural District: Zeberkhan

Population (2016)
  - Total: 1,197
- Time zone: UTC+3:30 (IRST)

Chenaran (Persian: چناران) (Note: Also romanized as Chanārān and Chenārān) is a village in Zeberkhan Rural District of the Central District in Zeberkhan County, Razavi Khorasan province, Iran.

== Demographics ==
=== Population ===
At the time of the 2006 National Census, the village's population was 1,660 in 402 households, when it was in the former Zeberkhan District of Nishapur County. The following census in 2011 counted 1,674 people in 454 households. The 2016 census measured the population of the village as 1,197 people in 392 households.

In 2020, the district was separated from the county in the establishment of Zeberkhan County, and the rural district was transferred to the new Central District.
