= Garineh =

Village in Razavi Khorasan province, Iran

Garineh Persian: گرينه
- Village
- Location within Iran
- Coordinates: 36°06′44″N 59°09′34″E
- Country: Iran
- Province: Razavi Khorasan
- County: Zeberkhan
- District: Central
- Rural District: Zeberkhan

Population (2016)
  - Total: 1,190
- Time zone: UTC+3:30 (IRST)

Garineh (Persian: گرينه) (Note: Also romanized as Garīneh and Gereyneh; also known as Gazīneh) is a village in Zeberkhan Rural District of the Central District in Zeberkhan County, Razavi Khorasan province, Iran.

== Demographics ==
=== Population ===
At the time of the 2006 National Census, the village's population was 1,725 in 514 households, when it was in the former Zeberkhan District of Nishapur County. The following census in 2011 counted 1,382 people in 483 households. The 2016 census measured the population of the village as 1,190 people in 465 households.

In 2020, the district was separated from the county in the establishment of Zeberkhan County, and the rural district was transferred to the new Central District.
