= Dowlatabad, Zeberkhan =

Village in Razavi Khorasan province, Iran

Dowlatabad Persian: دولتاباد
- Village
- Location within Iran
- Coordinates: 36°04′58″N 59°01′52″E
- Country: Iran
- Province: Razavi Khorasan
- County: Zeberkhan
- District: Central
- Rural District: Zeberkhan

Population (2016)
  - Total: 780
- Time zone: UTC+3:30 (IRST)

Dowlatabad (Persian: دولتاباد) (Note: Also romanized as Dowlatābād) is a village in Zeberkhan Rural District of the Central District in Zeberkhan County, Razavi Khorasan province, Iran.

== Demographics ==
=== Population ===
At the time of the 2006 National Census, the village's population was 640 in 168 households, when it was in the former Zeberkhan District of Nishapur County. The following census in 2011 counted 635 people in 190 households. The 2016 census measured the population of the village as 780 people in 262 households.

In 2020, the district was separated from the county in the establishment of Zeberkhan County, and the rural district was transferred to the new Central District.
