= Hasanabad-e Sabrow =

Village in Razavi Khorasan province, Iran

Hasanabad-e Sabrow Persian: حسن آباد سبرو
- Village
- Location within Iran
- Country: Iran
- Province: Razavi Khorasan
- County: Zeberkhan
- District: Central
- Rural District: Zeberkhan

Population (2016)
  - Total: 0
- Time zone: UTC+3:30 (IRST)

Hasanabad-e Sabrow (Persian: حسن آباد سبرو) (Note: Also romanized as Ḩasanābād-e Sabrow; also known as Ḩasanābād) is a village in Zeberkhan Rural District of the Central District in Zeberkhan County, Razavi Khorasan province, Iran.

== Demographics ==
=== Population ===
At the time of the 2006 National Census, the village's population was 27 in nine households, when it was in the former Zeberkhan District of Nishapur County. The following census in 2011 counted a population below the reporting threshold. The 2016 census measured the population of the village as zero.

In 2020, the district was separated from the county in the establishment of Zeberkhan County, and the rural district was transferred to the new Central District.
