= Aliabad, Zeberkhan =

Village in Razavi Khorasan province, Iran

Aliabad Persian: علی‌آباد
- Village
- Location within Iran
- Coordinates: 36°00′42″N 59°11′37″E
- Country: Iran
- Province: Razavi Khorasan
- County: Zeberkhan
- District: Central
- Rural District: Zeberkhan

Population (2016)
  - Total: 55
- Time zone: UTC+3:30 (IRST)

Aliabad (Persian: علی‌آباد) (Note: Also romanized as ‘Alīābād; also known as ‘Alī Kūrī (علي كوري) and Kalāteh-ye Ūrūj) is a village in Zeberkhan Rural District of the Central District in Zeberkhan County, Razavi Khorasan province, Iran.

== Demographics ==
=== Population ===
At the time of the 2006 National Census, the village's population was 48 in 19 households, when it was in the former Zeberkhan District of Nishapur County. The following census in 2011 counted 229 people in 21 households. The 2016 census measured the population of the village as 55 people in 19 households.

In 2020, the district was separated from the county in the establishment of Zeberkhan County, and the rural district was transferred to the new Central District.
