= Daneh Kashefiyeh =

Village in Razavi Khorasan province, Iran

Daneh Kashefiyeh Persian: دانه كاشفيه
- Village
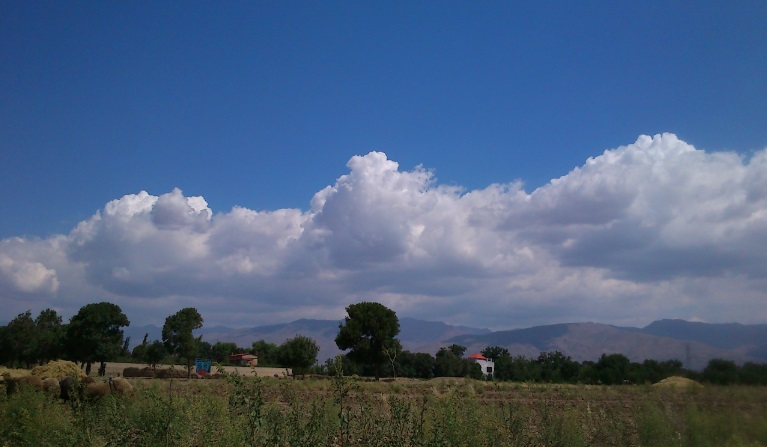
- The village of Daneh Kashefiyeh

- Location within Iran
- Coordinates: 36°03′48″N 59°07′33″E
- Country: Iran
- Province: Razavi Khorasan
- County: Zeberkhan
- District: Central
- Rural District: Zeberkhan

Population (2016)
  - Total: 307
- Time zone: UTC+3:30 (IRST)

Daneh Kashefiyeh (Persian: دانه كاشفيه) (Note: Also romanized as Dāneh Kāshefīyeh; also known as Dānehkāshefīyeh) is a village in Zeberkhan Rural District of the Central District in Zeberkhan County, Razavi Khorasan province, Iran.

== Demographics ==
=== Population ===
At the time of the 2006 National Census, the village's population was 467 in 122 households, when it was in the former Zeberkhan District of Nishapur County. The following census in 2011 counted 365 people in 112 households. The 2016 census measured the population of the village as 307 people in 102 households.

In 2020, the district was separated from the county in the establishment of Zeberkhan County, and the rural district was transferred to the new Central District.
