= Hajjiabad, Zeberkhan =

Village in Razavi Khorasan province, Iran

Hajjiabad Persian: حاجي اباد
- Village
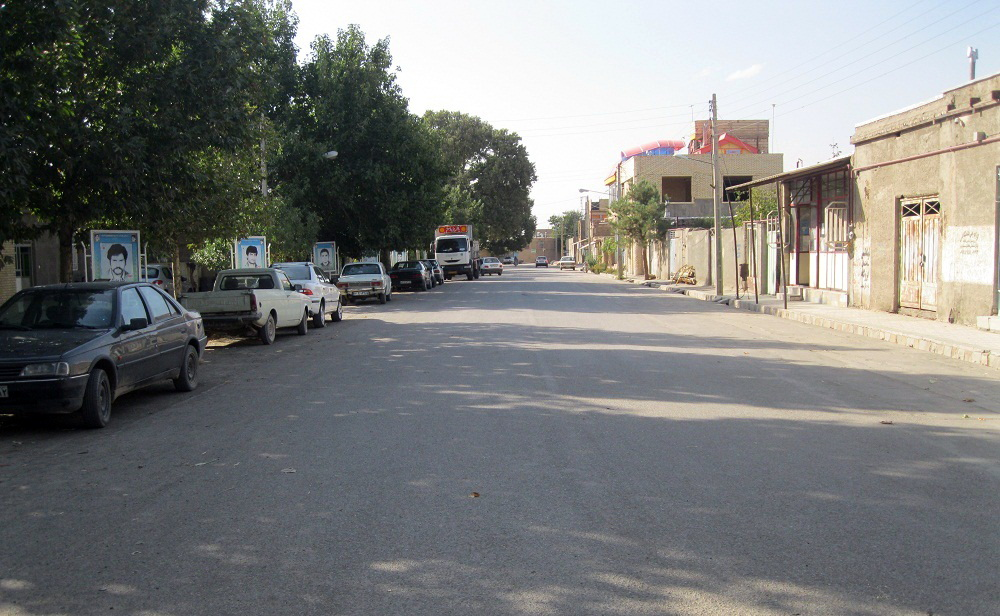
- Main street in the village of Hajjiabad

- Location within Iran
- Coordinates: 36°04′52″N 59°04′26″E
- Country: Iran
- Province: Razavi Khorasan
- County: Zeberkhan
- District: Central
- Rural District: Zeberkhan

Population (2016)
  - Total: 1,637
- Time zone: UTC+3:30 (IRST)

Hajjiabad (Persian: حاجي اباد) (Note: Also romanized as Ḩājjīābād) is a village in Zeberkhan Rural District of the Central District in Zeberkhan County, Razavi Khorasan province, Iran.

== Demographics ==
=== Population ===
At the time of the 2006 National Census, the village's population was 1,456 in 391 households, when it was in the former Zeberkhan District of Nishapur County. The following census in 2011 counted 1,527 people in 474 households. The 2016 census measured the population of the village as 1,637 people in 509 households.

In 2020, the district was separated from the county in the establishment of Zeberkhan County, and the rural district was transferred to the new Central District.
