= Sahel Borj =

Neighborhood in Razavi Khorasan province, Iran

Sahel Borj Persian: ساحل برج
- Neighborhood
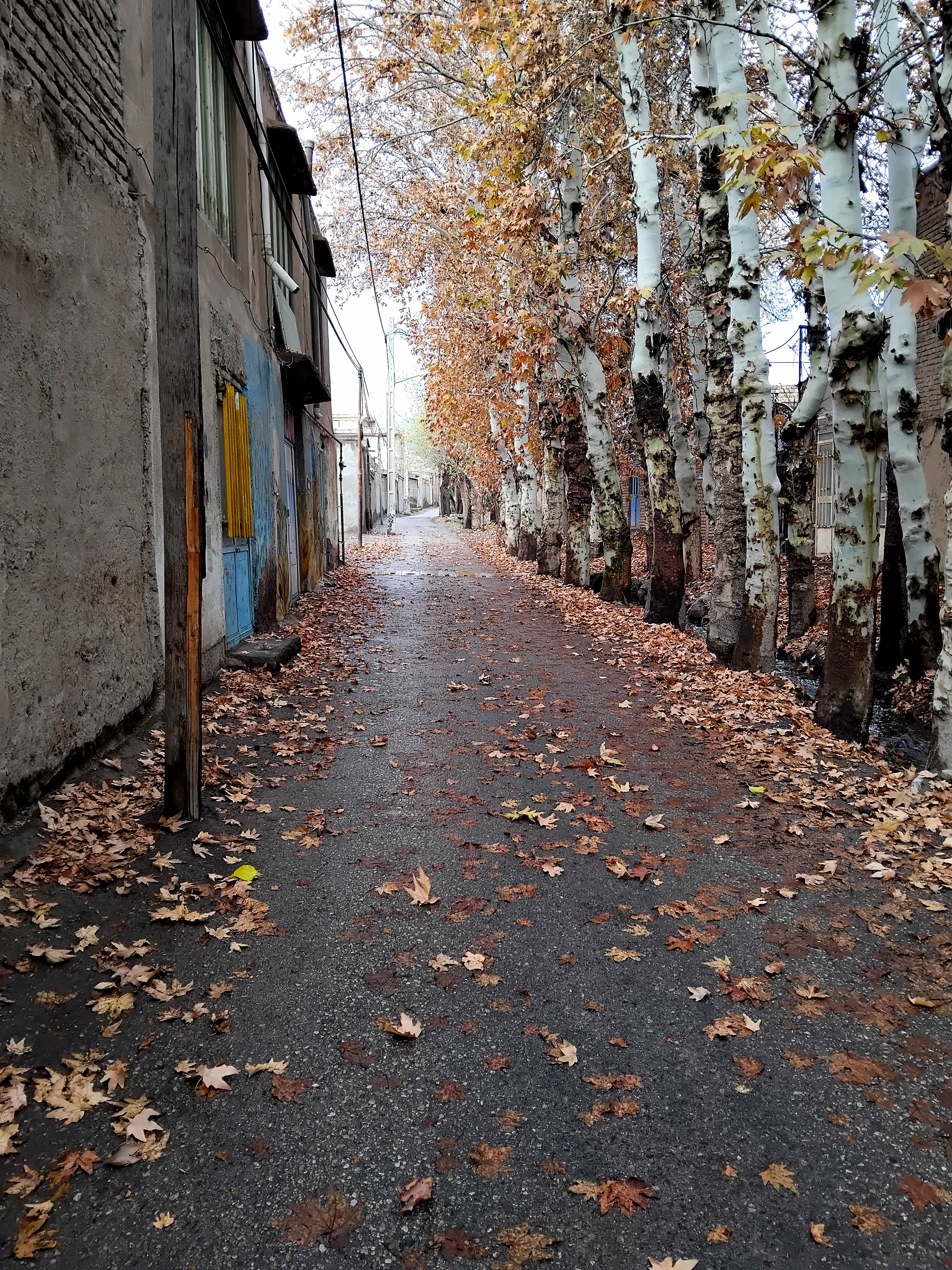
- Landscape in the neighborhood of Sahel Borj

- Location within Iran
- Coordinates: 36°07′49″N 59°00′24″E
- Country: Iran
- Province: Razavi Khorasan
- County: Zeberkhan
- District: Central
- City: Kharv

Population (2006)
  - Total: 1,726
- Time zone: UTC+3:30 (IRST)

Sahel Borj (Persian: ساحل برج) (Note: Also romanized as Sāḩel Borj) is a neighborhood in the city of Kharv in the Central District of Zeberkhan County, Razavi Khorasan province, Iran. As a village, it was the capital of Ordughesh Rural District in Zeberkhan District of Nishapur County until its capital was transferred to the village of Ordughesh.

== Demographics ==
=== Population ===
At the time of the 2006 National Census, Sahel Borj's population was 1,726 in 459 households, when it was a village in Ordughesh Rural District of Zeberkhan District in Nishapur County.

After the census, Sahel Borj was annexed by the city of Kharv. In 2020, the district was separated from the county in the establishment of Zeberkhan County, and the rural district was transferred to the new Central District.
