= Akbarabad, Zeberkhan =

Village in Razavi Khorasan province, Iran

Akbarabad Persian: اكبراباد
- Village
- Location within Iran
- Coordinates: 36°8′24″N 59°1′48″E
- Country: Iran
- Province: Razavi Khorasan
- County: Zeberkhan
- District: Central
- Rural District: Ordughesh

Population (2016)
  - Total: Below reporting threshold
- Time zone: UTC+3:30 (IRST)

Akbarabad (Persian: اكبراباد) (Note: Also romanized as Akbarābād) is a village in Ordughesh Rural District of the Central District in Zeberkhan County, Razavi Khorasan province, Iran.

== Demographics ==
=== Population ===
At the time of the 2006 National Census, the village's population was 35 in six households, when it was in the former Zeberkhan District of Nishapur County. The following census in 2011 counted 17 people in five households. The 2016 census measured the population of the village as below the reporting threshold.

In 2020, the district was separated from the county in the establishment of Zeberkhan County, and the rural district was transferred to the new Central District.
