= Harimabad =

Village in Razavi Khorasan province, Iran

Harimabad Persian: حريماباد
- Village
- Location within Iran
- Coordinates: 36°06′37″N 59°06′54″E
- Country: Iran
- Province: Razavi Khorasan
- County: Zeberkhan
- District: Central
- Rural District: Zeberkhan

Population (2016)
  - Total: 314
- Time zone: UTC+3:30 (IRST)

Harimabad (Persian: حريماباد) (Note: Also romanized as Ḩarīmābād) is a village in Zeberkhan Rural District of the Central District in Zeberkhan County, Razavi Khorasan province, Iran.

== Demographics ==
=== Population ===
At the time of the 2006 National Census, the village's population was 284 in 82 households, when it was in the former Zeberkhan District of Nishapur County. The following census in 2011 counted 297 people in 95 households. The 2016 census measured the population of the village as 314 people in 104 households.

In 2020, the district was separated from the county in the establishment of Zeberkhan County, and the rural district was transferred to the new Central District.
