= Sartalkh =

Village in Razavi Khorasan province, Iran

Sartalkh Persian: سرتلخ
- Village
- Location within Iran
- Coordinates: 36°05′57″N 59°04′44″E
- Country: Iran
- Province: Razavi Khorasan
- County: Zeberkhan
- District: Central
- Rural District: Zeberkhan

Population (2016)
  - Total: 259
- Time zone: UTC+3:30 (IRST)

Sartalkh (Persian: سرتلخ) is a village in Zeberkhan Rural District of the Central District in Zeberkhan County, Razavi Khorasan province, Iran.

== Demographics ==
=== Population ===
At the time of the 2006 National Census, the village's population was 251 in 73 households, when it was in the former Zeberkhan District of Nishapur County. The following census in 2011 counted 248 people in 72 households. The 2016 census measured the population of the village as 259 people in 82 households.

In 2020, the district was separated from the county in the establishment of Zeberkhan County, and the rural district was transferred to the new Central District.
