= Pust Forushan =

Village in Razavi Khorasan province, Iran

Pust Forushan Persian: پوست فروشان
- Village
- Location within Iran
- Coordinates: 36°07′11″N 59°03′36″E
- Country: Iran
- Province: Razavi Khorasan
- County: Zeberkhan
- District: Central
- Rural District: Zeberkhan

Population (2016)
  - Total: 907
- Time zone: UTC+3:30 (IRST)

Pust Forushan (Persian: پوست فروشان) (Note: Also romanized as Pūst Forūshān; also known as Pīsh Forūsh and Pūst Forūsh) is a village in Zeberkhan Rural District of the Central District in Zeberkhan County, Razavi Khorasan province, Iran.

== Demographics ==
=== Population ===
At the time of the 2006 National Census, the village's population was 752 in 200 households, when it was in the former Zeberkhan District of Nishapur County. The following census in 2011 counted 905 people in 281 households. The 2016 census measured the population of the village as 907 people in 300 households.

In 2020, the district was separated from the county in the establishment of Zeberkhan County, and the rural district was transferred to the new Central District.
