= Abdollahabad, Zeberkhan =

Village in Razavi Khorasan province, Iran

Abdollahabad Persian: عبداله اباد
- Village
- Location within Iran
- Coordinates: 36°06′07″N 58°58′04″E
- Country: Iran
- Province: Razavi Khorasan
- County: Zeberkhan
- District: Central
- Rural District: Ordughesh

Population (2016)
  - Total: 1,003
- Time zone: UTC+3:30 (IRST)

Abdollahabad (Persian: عبدالله‌آباد) (Note: Also romanized as ‘Abdollāhābād) is a village in Ordughesh Rural District of the Central District in Zeberkhan County, Razavi Khorasan province, Iran.

== Demographics ==
=== Population ===
At the time of the 2006 National Census, the village's population was 998 in 266 households, when it was in the former Zeberkhan District of Nishapur County. The following census in 2011 counted 1,137 people in 313 households. The 2016 census measured the population of the village as 1,003 people in 348 households.

In 2020, the district was separated from the county in the establishment of Zeberkhan County, and the rural district was transferred to the new Central District.
