= Das, Iran =

Village in Razavi Khorasan province, Iran

Das Persian: داس
- Village
- Location within Iran
- Coordinates: 36°10′00″N 59°05′15″E
- Country: Iran
- Province: Razavi Khorasan
- County: Zeberkhan
- District: Central
- Rural District: Zeberkhan

Population (2016)
  - Total: 340
- Time zone: UTC+3:30 (IRST)

Das (Persian: داس) (Note: Also romanized as Dās) is a village in Zeberkhan Rural District of the Central District in Zeberkhan County, Razavi Khorasan province, Iran.

== Demographics ==
=== Population ===
At the time of the 2006 National Census, the village's population was 343 in 77 households, when it was in the former Zeberkhan District of Nishapur County. The following census in 2011 counted 343 people in 95 households. The 2016 census measured the population of the village as 340 people in 99 households.

In 2020, the district was separated from the county in the establishment of Zeberkhan County, and the rural district was transferred to the new Central District.
