= Saidiyeh, Razavi Khorasan =

Village in Razavi Khorasan province, Iran

Saidiyeh Persian: سعيديه
- Village
- Location within Iran
- Coordinates: 36°08′28″N 58°56′56″E
- Country: Iran
- Province: Razavi Khorasan
- County: Zeberkhan
- District: Central
- Rural District: Ordughesh

Population (2016)
  - Total: 510
- Time zone: UTC+3:30 (IRST)

Saidiyeh (Persian: سعيديه) (Note: Also romanized as Sa‘īdīyeh) is a village in Ordughesh Rural District of the Central District in Zeberkhan County, Razavi Khorasan province, Iran.

== Demographics ==
=== Population ===
At the time of the 2006 National Census, the village's population was 557 in 152 households, when it was in the former Zeberkhan District of Nishapur County. The following census in 2011 counted 567 people in 181 households. The 2016 census measured the population of the village as 510 people in 186 households.

In 2020, the district was separated from the county in the establishment of Zeberkhan County, and the rural district was transferred to the new Central District.
