= Qaleh Vazir =

Village in Razavi Khorasan province, Iran

Qaleh Vazir Persian: قلعه وزير
- Village
- Location within Iran
- Coordinates: 36°01′26″N 59°10′39″E
- Country: Iran
- Province: Razavi Khorasan
- County: Zeberkhan
- District: Central
- Rural District: Zeberkhan

Population (2016)
  - Total: 223
- Time zone: UTC+3:30 (IRST)

Qaleh Vazir (Persian: قلعه وزير) (Note: Also romanized as Qal’eh Vazīr and Qal‘eh-ye Vazīr; also known as Kalāteh Vazīr and Qal‘eh-ye Bāzār) is a village in Zeberkhan Rural District of the Central District in Zeberkhan County, Razavi Khorasan province, Iran.

== Demographics ==
=== Population ===
At the time of the 2006 National Census, the village's population was 200 in 60 households, when it was in the former Zeberkhan District of Nishapur County. The following census in 2011 counted 217 people in 80 households. The 2016 census measured the population of the village as 223 people in 84 households.

In 2020, the district was separated from the county in the establishment of Zeberkhan County, and the rural district was transferred to the new Central District.
