= Kalateh-ye Saqi =

Village in Razavi Khorasan province, Iran

Kalateh-ye Saqi Persian: كلاته ساقي
- Village
- Location within Iran
- Coordinates: 36°10′36″N 58°59′22″E
- Country: Iran
- Province: Razavi Khorasan
- County: Zeberkhan
- District: Central
- Rural District: Ordughesh

Population (2016)
  - Total: 231
- Time zone: UTC+3:30 (IRST)

Kalateh-ye Saqi (Persian: كلاته ساقي) (Note: Also romanized as Kalāteh-ye Sāqī; also known as Kalāteh-ye Eqbāl (كلاته اقبال)) is a village in Ordughesh Rural District of the Central District in Zeberkhan County, Razavi Khorasan province, Iran.

== Demographics ==
=== Population ===
At the time of the 2006 National Census, the village's population was 227 in 70 households, when it was in the former Zeberkhan District of Nishapur County. The following census in 2011 counted 186 people in 61 households. The 2016 census measured the population of the village as 231 people in 83 households.

In 2020, the district was separated from the county in the establishment of Zeberkhan County, and the rural district was transferred to the new Central District.
