= Kariz-e Now, Zeberkhan =

Village in Razavi Khorasan province, Iran

Kariz-e Now Persian: كاريزنو
- Village
- Location within Iran
- Coordinates: 36°05′28″N 59°04′32″E
- Country: Iran
- Province: Razavi Khorasan
- County: Zeberkhan
- District: Central
- Rural District: Zeberkhan

Population (2016)
  - Total: 687
- Time zone: UTC+3:30 (IRST)

Kariz-e Now (Persian: كاريزنو) (Note: Also romanized as Kārīz Now and Kārīz-e Now) is a village in Zeberkhan Rural District of the Central District in Zeberkhan County, Razavi Khorasan province, Iran.

== Demographics ==
=== Population ===
At the time of the 2006 National Census, the village's population was 599 in 163 households, when it was in the former Zeberkhan District of Nishapur County. The following census in 2011 counted 658 people in 204 households. The 2016 census measured the population of the village as 687 people in 213 households.

In 2020, the district was separated from the county in the establishment of Zeberkhan County, and the rural district was transferred to the new Central District.
