= Hesar, Zeberkhan =

Village in Razavi Khorasan province, Iran

Hesar Persian: حصار
- Village
- Location within Iran
- Coordinates: 36°02′44″N 59°14′32″E
- Country: Iran
- Province: Razavi Khorasan
- County: Zeberkhan
- District: Central
- Rural District: Zeberkhan

Population (2016)
  - Total: 1,027
- Time zone: UTC+3:30 (IRST)

Hesar (Persian: حصار) (Note: Also romanized as Ḩeşār; also known as Ḩeşār-e Ardovey and Ḩeşār-e Ardovī) is a village in Zeberkhan Rural District of the Central District in Zeberkhan County, Razavi Khorasan province, Iran.

== Demographics ==
=== Population ===
At the time of the 2006 National Census, the village's population was 853 in 233 households, when it was in the former Zeberkhan District of Nishapur County. The following census in 2011 counted 857 people in 262 households. The 2016 census measured the population of the village as 1,027 people in 343 households.

In 2020, the district was separated from the county in the establishment of Zeberkhan County, and the rural district was transferred to the new Central District.
