= Cheshmeh Khosrow, Razavi Khorasan =

Village in Razavi Khorasan province, Iran

Cheshmeh Khosrow Persian: چشمه خسرو
- Village
- Location within Iran
- Coordinates: 36°02′09″N 59°11′01″E
- Country: Iran
- Province: Razavi Khorasan
- County: Zeberkhan
- District: Central
- Rural District: Zeberkhan

Population (2016)
  - Total: 92
- Time zone: UTC+3:30 (IRST)

Cheshmeh Khosrow (Persian: چشمه خسرو) (Note: Also romanized as Chashmeh Khosrow) is a village in Zeberkhan Rural District of the Central District in Zeberkhan County, Razavi Khorasan province, Iran.

== Demographics ==
=== Population ===
At the time of the 2006 National Census, the village's population was 78 in 25 households, when it was in the former Zeberkhan District of Nishapur County. The following census in 2011 counted 84 people in 24 households. The 2016 census measured the population of the village as 92 people in 32 households.

In 2020, the district was separated from the county in the establishment of Zeberkhan County, and the rural district was transferred to the new Central District.
