= Mushan, Iran =

Village in Razavi Khorasan province, Iran

Mushan Persian: موشان
- Village
- Location within Iran
- Coordinates: 36°03′30″N 59°08′36″E
- Country: Iran
- Province: Razavi Khorasan
- County: Zeberkhan
- District: Central
- Rural District: Zeberkhan

Population (2016)
  - Total: 201
- Time zone: UTC+3:30 (IRST)

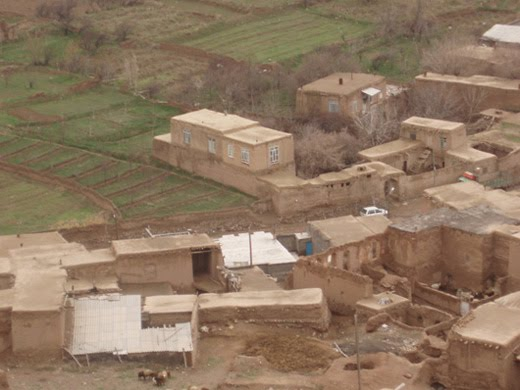

Mushan (Persian: موشان) (Note: Also romanized as Mūshān; also known as Khūshān and Kūshān (كوشان)) is a village in Zeberkhan Rural District of the Central District in Zeberkhan County, Razavi Khorasan province, Iran.

== Demographics ==
=== Population ===
At the time of the 2006 National Census, the village's population was 346 in 110 households, when it was in the former Zeberkhan District of Nishapur County. The following census in 2011 counted 283 people in 103 households. The 2016 census measured the population of the village as 201 people in 90 households.

In 2020, the district was separated from the county in the establishment of Zeberkhan County, and the rural district was transferred to the new Central District.
