= Cheshmeh Khosrow =

Cheshmeh Khosrow or Chashmeh Khosrow or Chashmeh-ye Kosrow (Persian: چشمه خسرو) may refer to:

- Cheshmeh Khosrow, Kermanshah
- Cheshmeh Khosrow, Razavi Khorasan
