= Zeberkhan =

Zeberkhan (Persian: زبرخان) may refer to:

- Zeberkhan District
- Zeberkhan Rural District
