= Amir Cheshme Khosravi =

Iranian footballer

Personal information
- Date of birth: 4 May 1998 (age 28)
- Place of birth: Cheshmeh Khosrow, Kermanshah, Iran
- Height: 1.84 m (6 ft 1/2 in)
- Position: Defender

Team information
- Current team: Fajr Sepasi
- Number: 76

Youth career
- 2016–2018: Pars Jonoubi Jam

Senior career*
Years	Team	Apps	(Gls)
2018–2019	Pars Jonoubi	6	(0)
2019–2021	Fajr Sepasi	36	(1)
2021–2022	Zob Ahan	7	(0)
2022–2024	Paykan	11	(0)
2024–2025	Shams Azar	21	(1)
2025–2026	Gol Gohar	5	(0)
2026–	Fajr Sepasi	2	(0)
- * Club domestic league appearances and goals as of 18 April 2025

Amir Cheshme Khosravi "Shabani" (Persian: امیر چشمه‌خسروی, born 4 May 1998) is an Iranian footballer who plays as a Defender for Fajr Sepasi in the Persian Gulf Pro League

== Club career ==
=== Pars Jonoubi Jam ===
He made his debut for Pars Jonoubi Jam in 15th fixtures of 2018–19 Iran Pro League against Persepolis while he substituted in for Mohsen Bengar.
