= Ordughesh Rural District =

Rural district in Razavi Khorasan province, Iran

Ordughesh Rural District Persian: دهستان اردوغش
- Rural District
- Location within Iran
- Coordinates: 36°12′N 59°03′E
- Country: Iran
- Province: Razavi Khorasan
- County: Zeberkhan
- District: Central
- Established: 1987
- Capital: Ordughesh

Population (2016)
  - Total: 8,174
- Time zone: UTC+3:30 (IRST)

Ordughesh Rural District (Persian: دهستان اردوغش) is in the Central District of Zeberkhan County, Razavi Khorasan province, Iran. Its capital is the village of Ordughesh. The previous capital of the rural district was the village of Sahel Borj, now a neighborhood in the city of Kharv.

== Demographics ==
=== Population ===
At the time of the 2006 National Census, the rural district's population (as a part of the former Zeberkhan District in Nishapur County) was 9,788 in 2,540 households. There were 8,556 inhabitants in 2,552 households at the following census of 2011. The 2016 census measured the population of the rural district as 8,174 in 2,784 households. The most populous of its 44 villages was Ordughesh, with 1,914 people.

In 2020, the district was separated from the county in the establishment of Zeberkhan County, and the rural district was transferred to the new Central District.

=== Other villages in the rural district ===
- Abdollahabad
- Akbarabad
- Borj
- Buzh Mehran
- Deh Now-ye Hashemabad
- Istgah Kheyam
- Kalateh-ye Saqi
- Karimabad
- Kariz-e Now
- Kazemabad
- Khosrowabad
- Mohsenabad
- Saidiyeh
