= Khushan =

Khushan may refer to:

- Khushan, Qazvin
- Khushan, Razavi Khorasan
