= Qadamgah Mosque =

Shi'ite mosque in Qadamgah, Razavi Khorasan, Iran

- مجموعه تاریخی قدمگاه
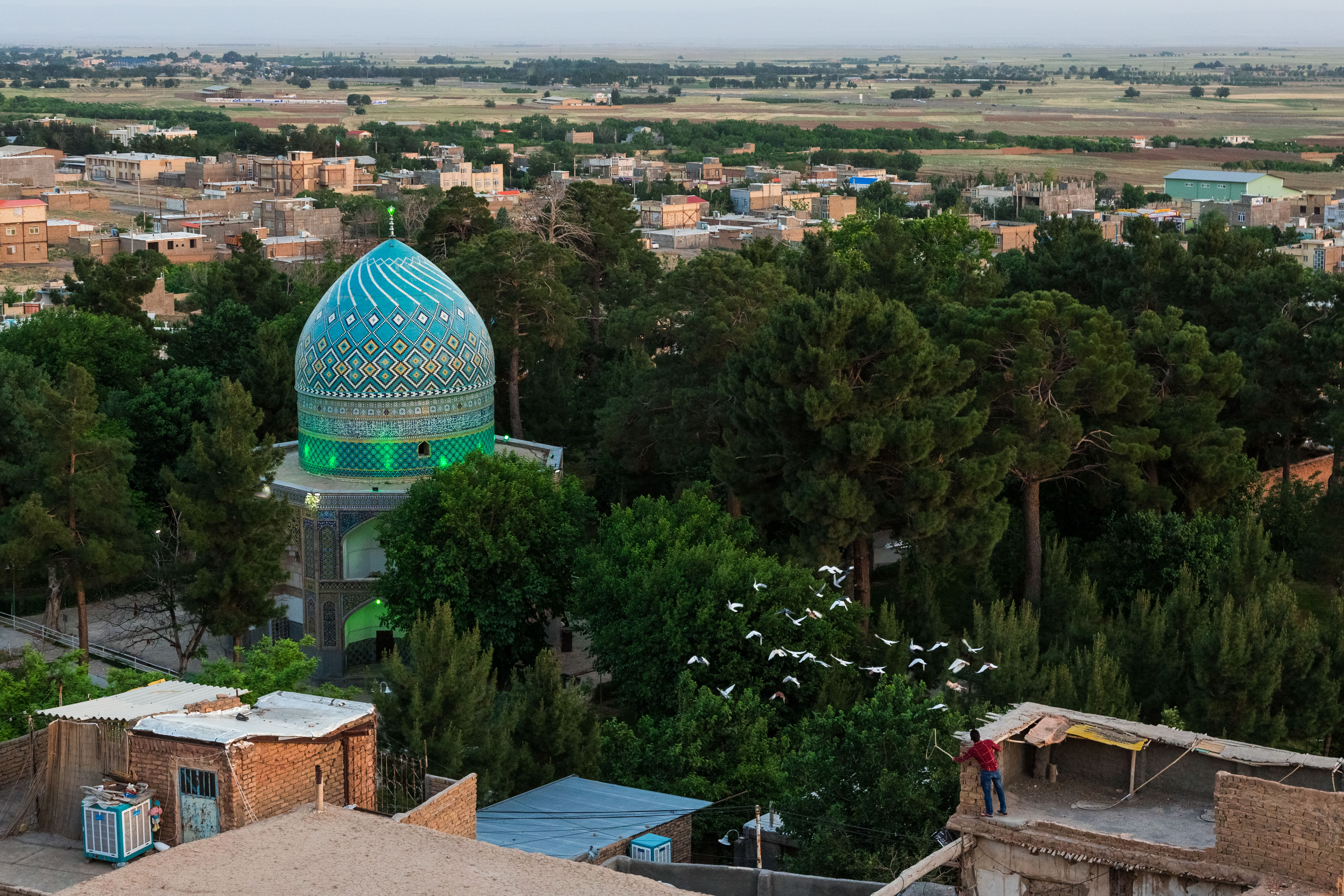

- Location of the mosque in Iran

Religion
- Affiliation: Shia Islam
- Ecclesiastical or organisational status: Mosque and shrine complex
- Status: Active

Location
- Location: Qadamgah, Razavi Khorasan Province
- Country: Iran
- Coordinates: 36°6′30″N 59°3′48″E

Architecture
- Type: Mosque architecture
- Style: Safavid
- Completed: 1680 CE

Specifications
- Dome: One
- Materials: Bricks; plaster; tiles

Iran National Heritage List
- Official name: Qadamgah Mosque
- Type: Mosque
- Designated: 1935
- Reference no.: 236
- Conservation organization: Cultural Heritage, Handicrafts and Tourism Organization of Iran

The Qadamgah Mosque (Persian: مجموعه تاریخی قدمگاه), also known as the Qadamgah Shrine, is a Shi'ite mosque located in Qadamgah, in the county of Zeberkhan, in the province of Razavi Khorasan, Iran.

Completed in 1680 CE, during the Safavid era, the mosque was added to the Iran National Heritage List on 7 December 1935, administered by the Cultural Heritage, Handicrafts and Tourism Organization of Iran.

== Gallery ==
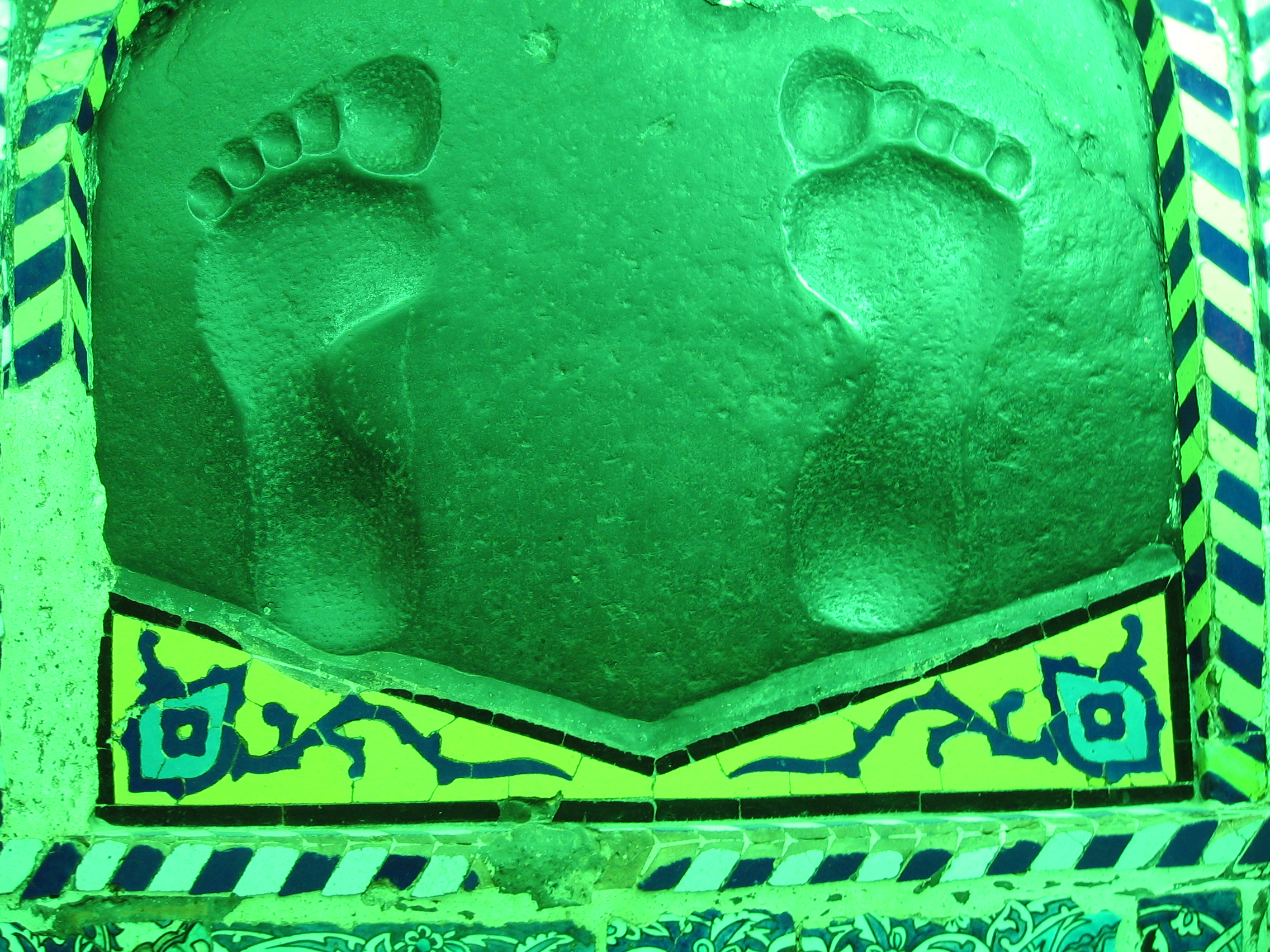
Interior view, showing the footprints of Imam Ali Al-Rida

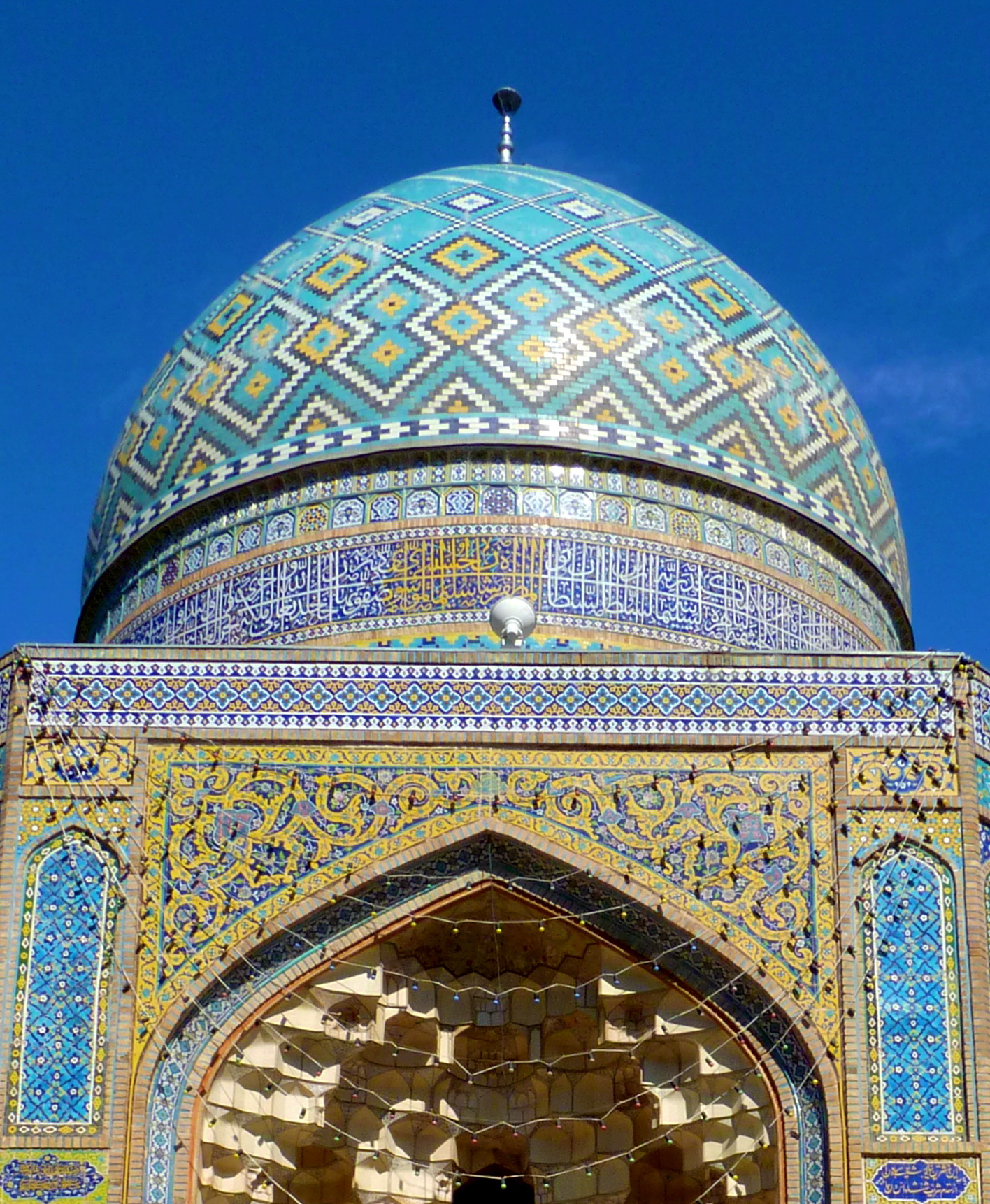
The mosque in 2012

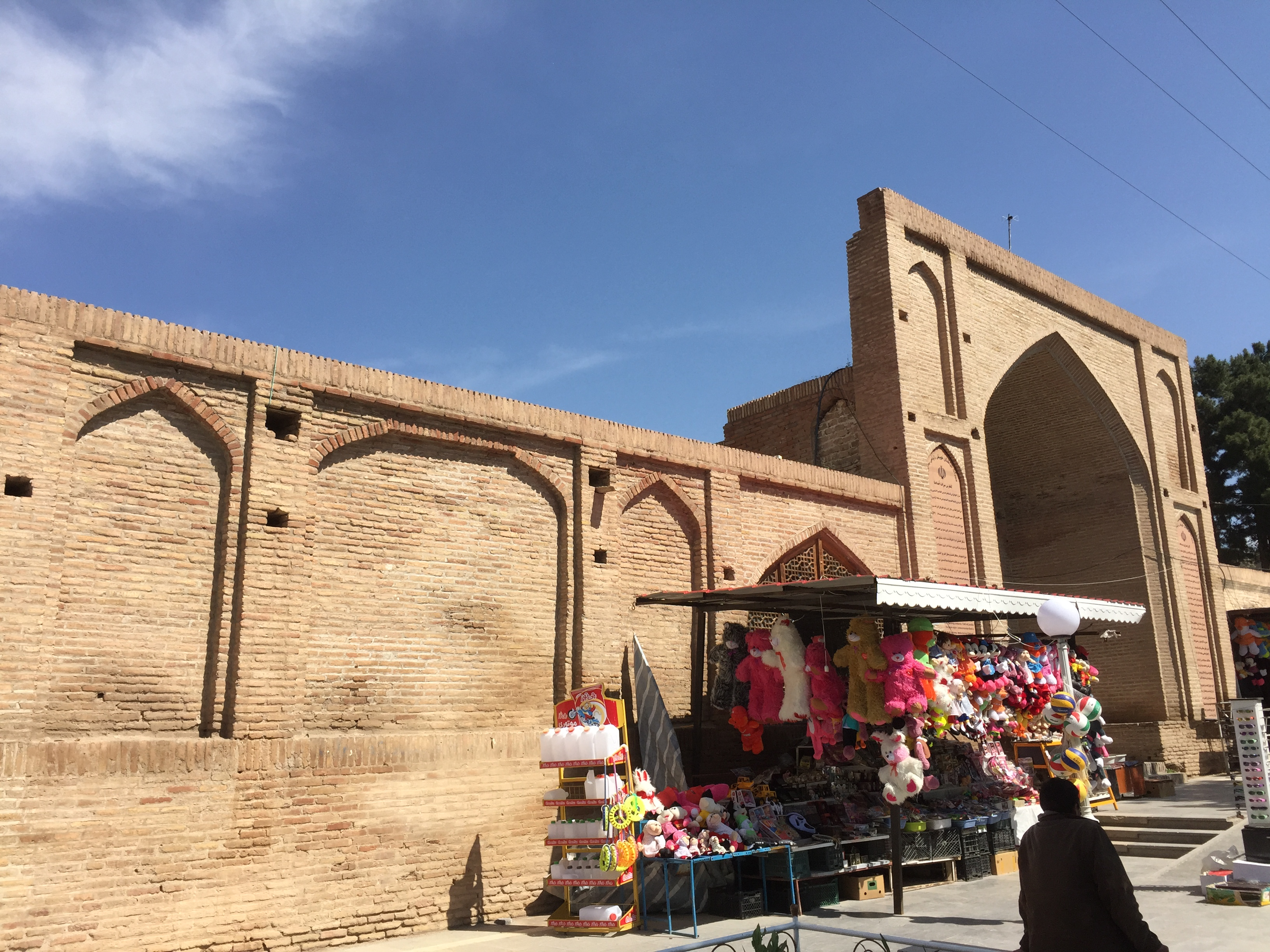

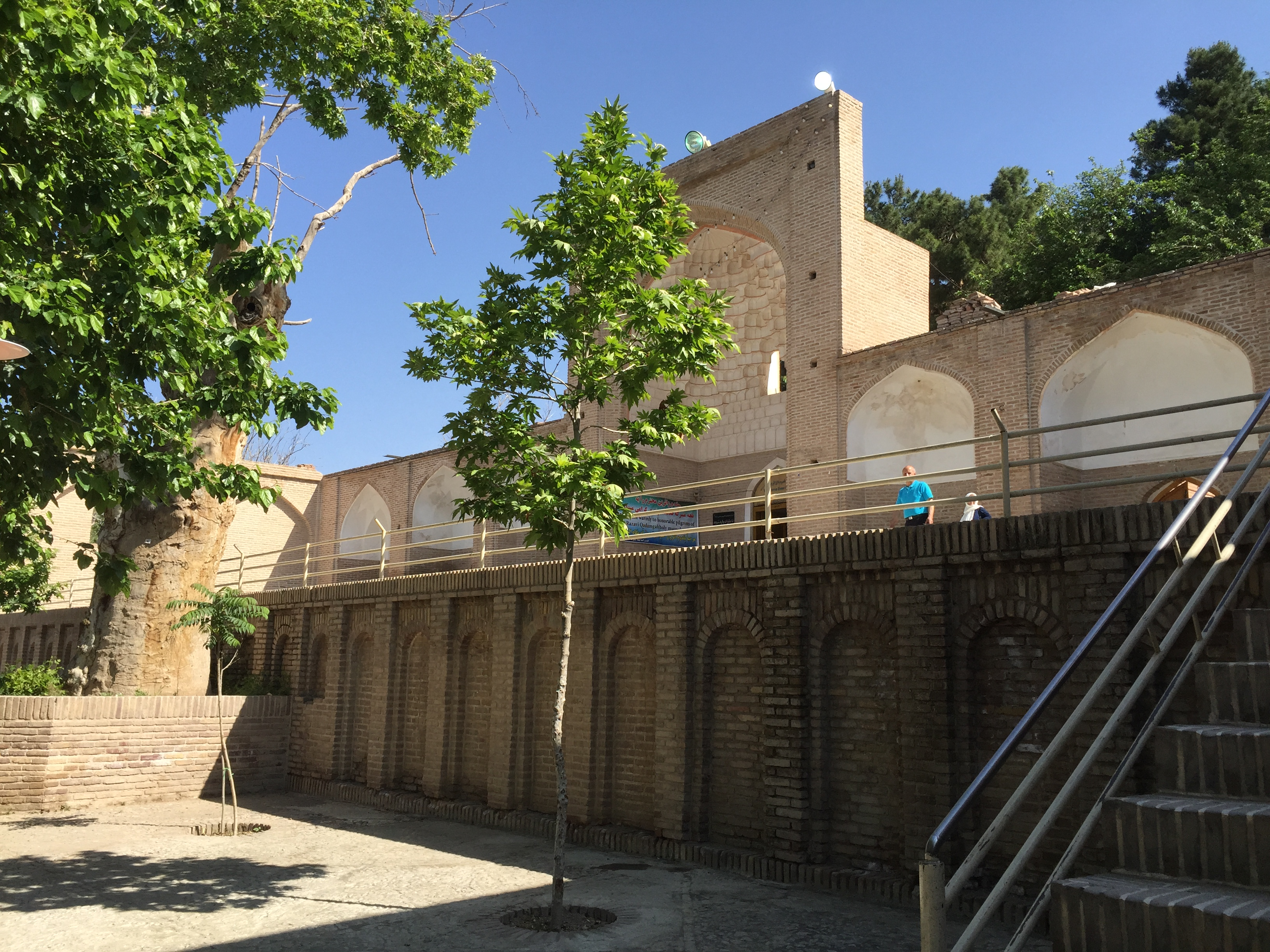

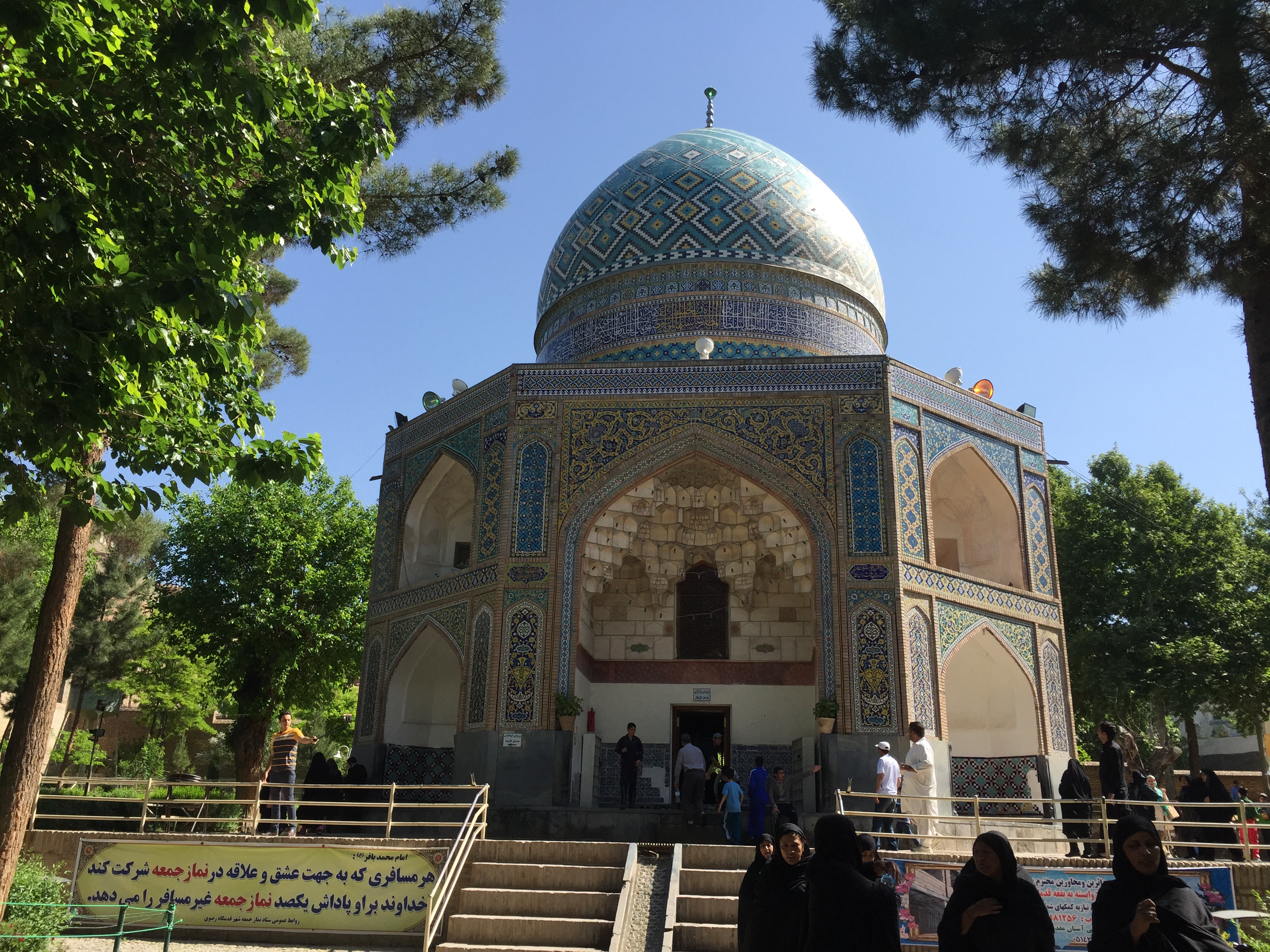

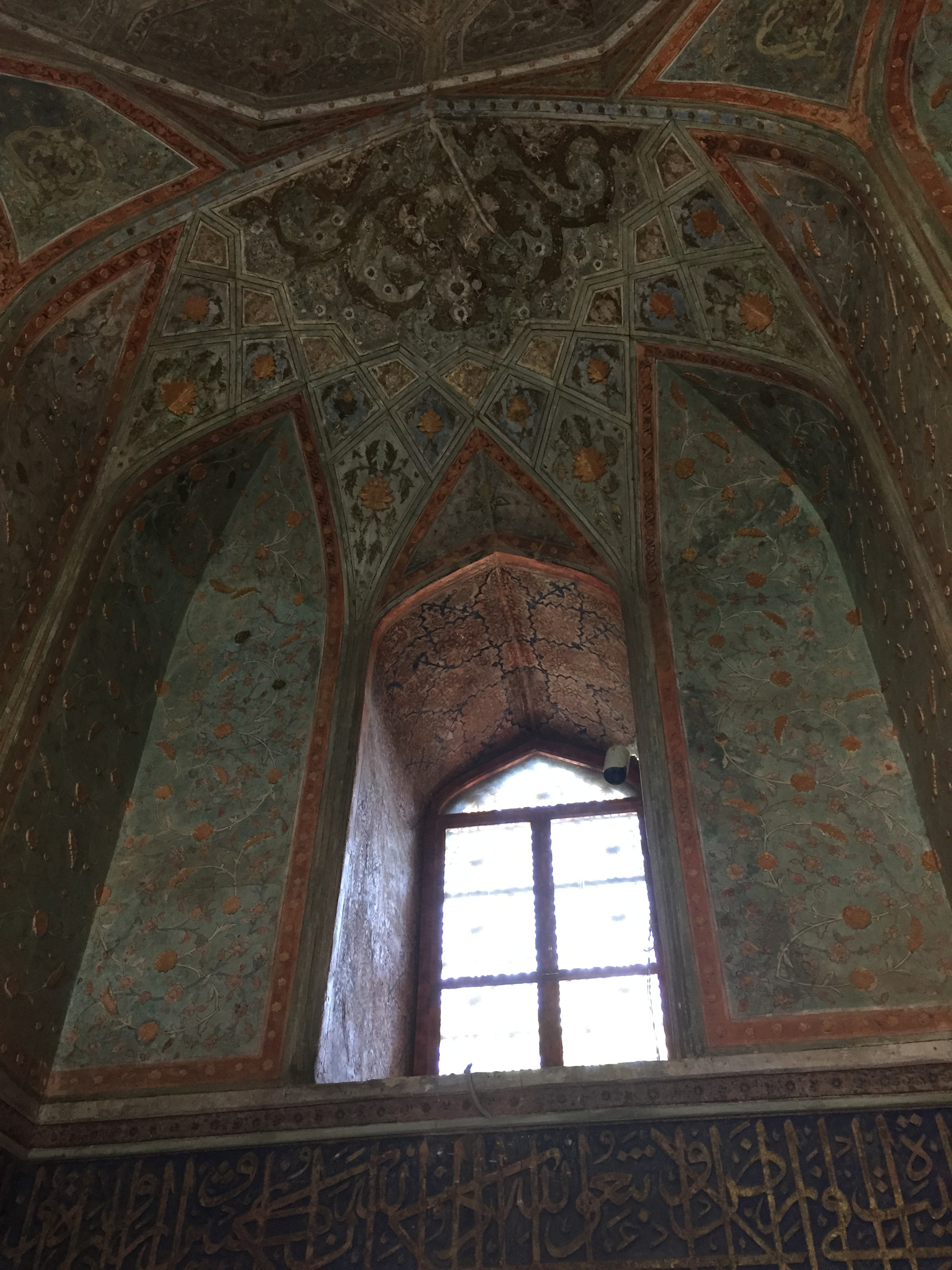

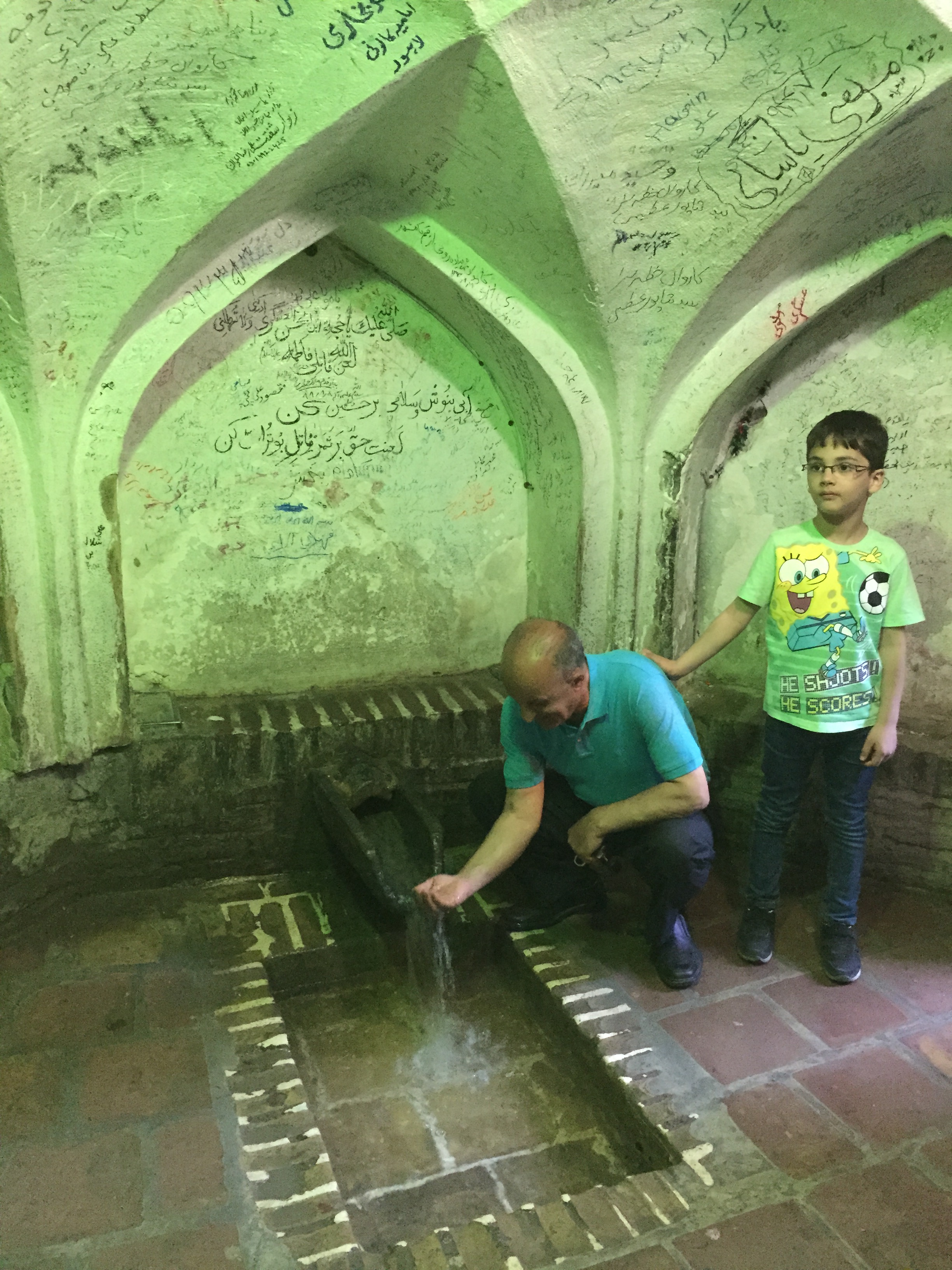

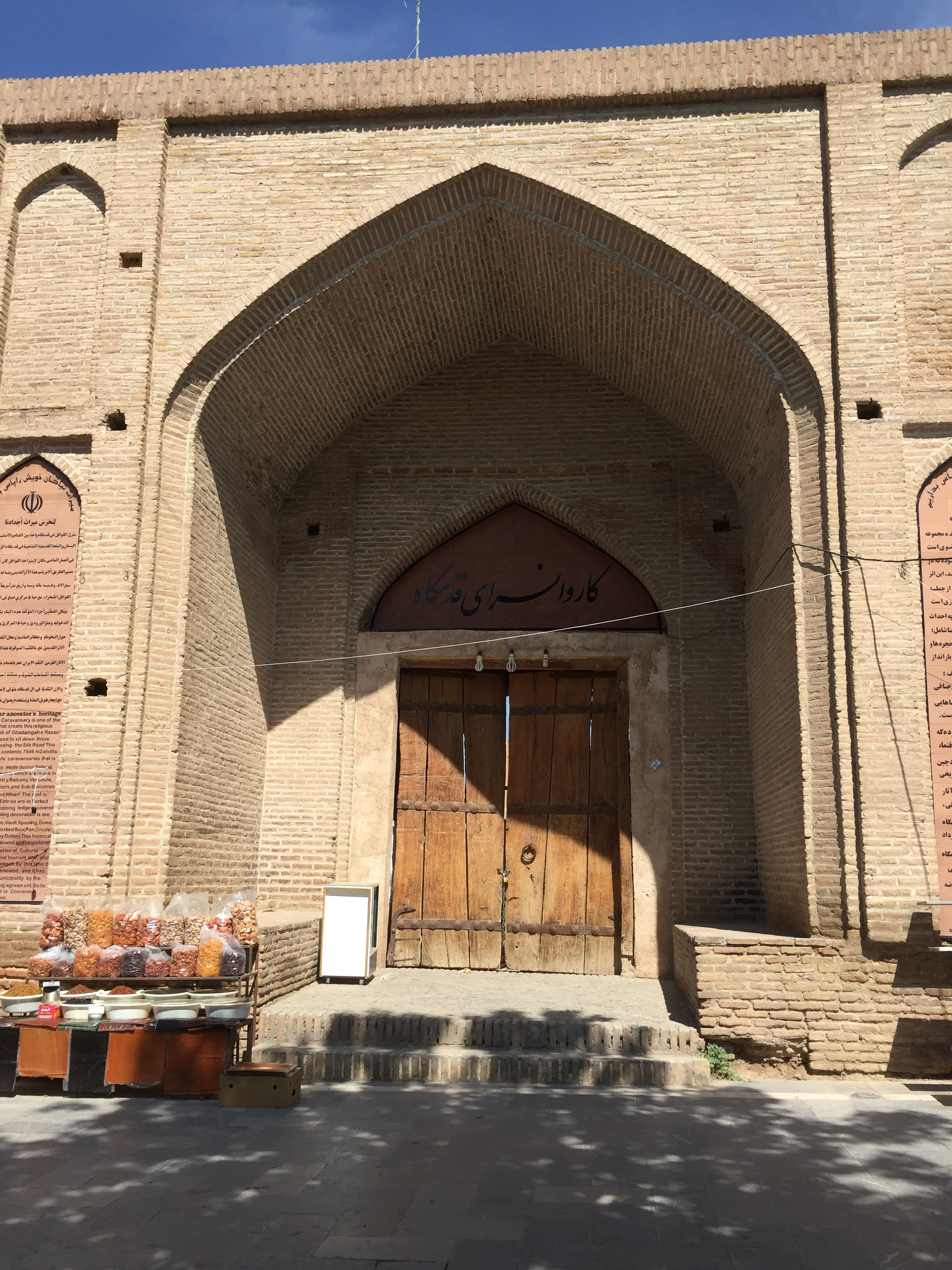

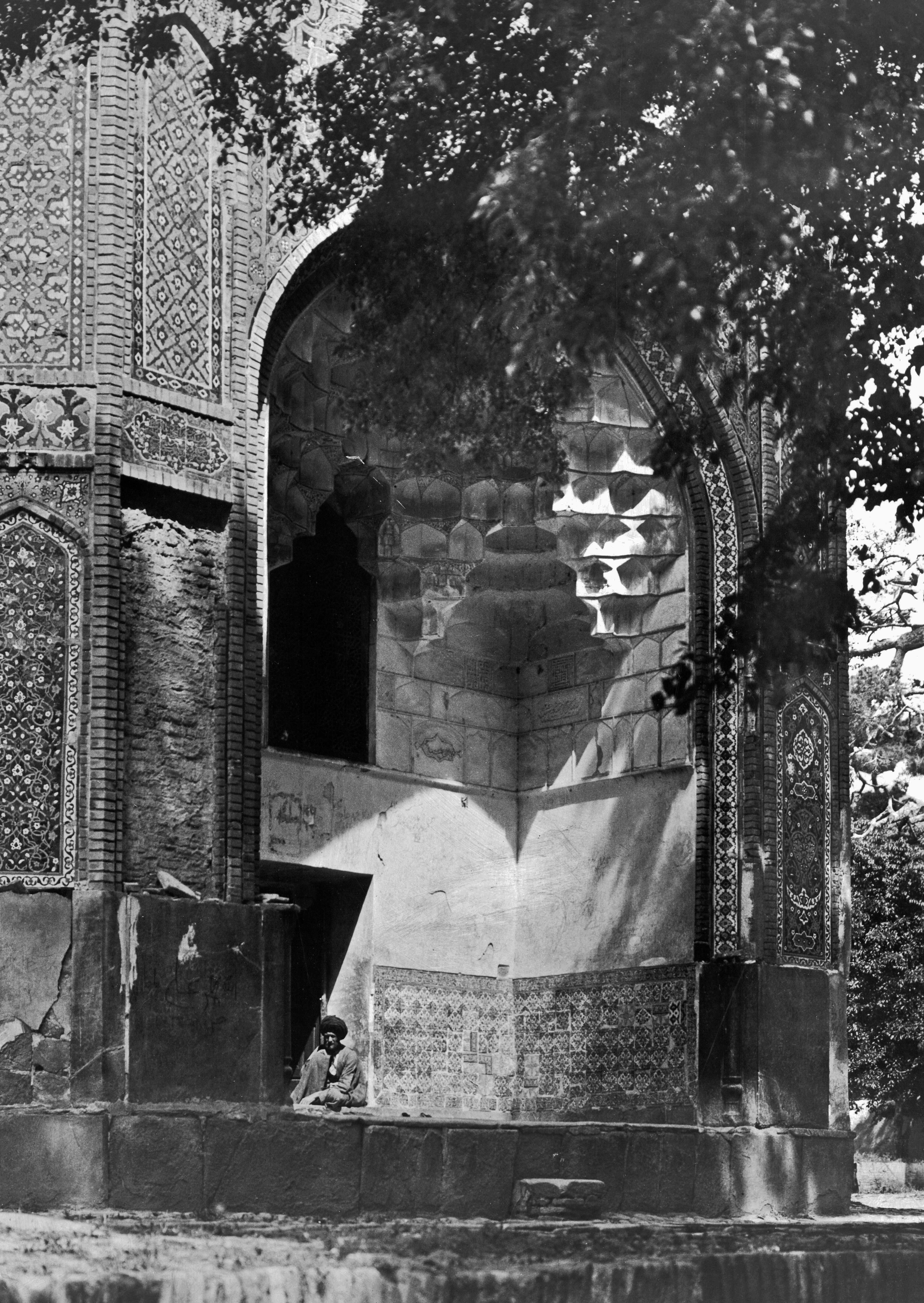

== See also ==
- Shia Islam in Iran
- List of mosques in Iran
