= Darrud =

City in Razavi Khorasan province, Iran

Darrud Persian: درود
- City
- Location within Iran
- Coordinates: 36°08′10″N 59°06′49″E
- Country: Iran
- Province: Razavi Khorasan
- County: Zeberkhan
- District: Central

Population (2016)
  - Total: 5,717
- Time zone: UTC+3:30 (IRST)

Darrud (Persian: درود) (Note: Also romanized as Dar Rūd and Darrūd) is a city in the Central District of Zeberkhan County, Razavi Khorasan province, Iran.

== Demographics ==
=== Population ===
At the time of the 2006 National Census, the city's population was 4,979 in 1,431 households, when it was in the former Zeberkhan District of Nishapur County. The following census in 2011 counted 5,449 people in 1,618 households. The 2016 census measured the population of the city as 5,717 people in 1,846 households.

In 2020, the district was separated from the county in the establishment of Zeberkhan County, and Darrud was transferred to the new Central District.

=== Neighborhoods ===
- Jafarabad
