= Qadamgah =

City in Razavi Khorasan province, Iran

Qadamgah Persian: قدمگاه
- City
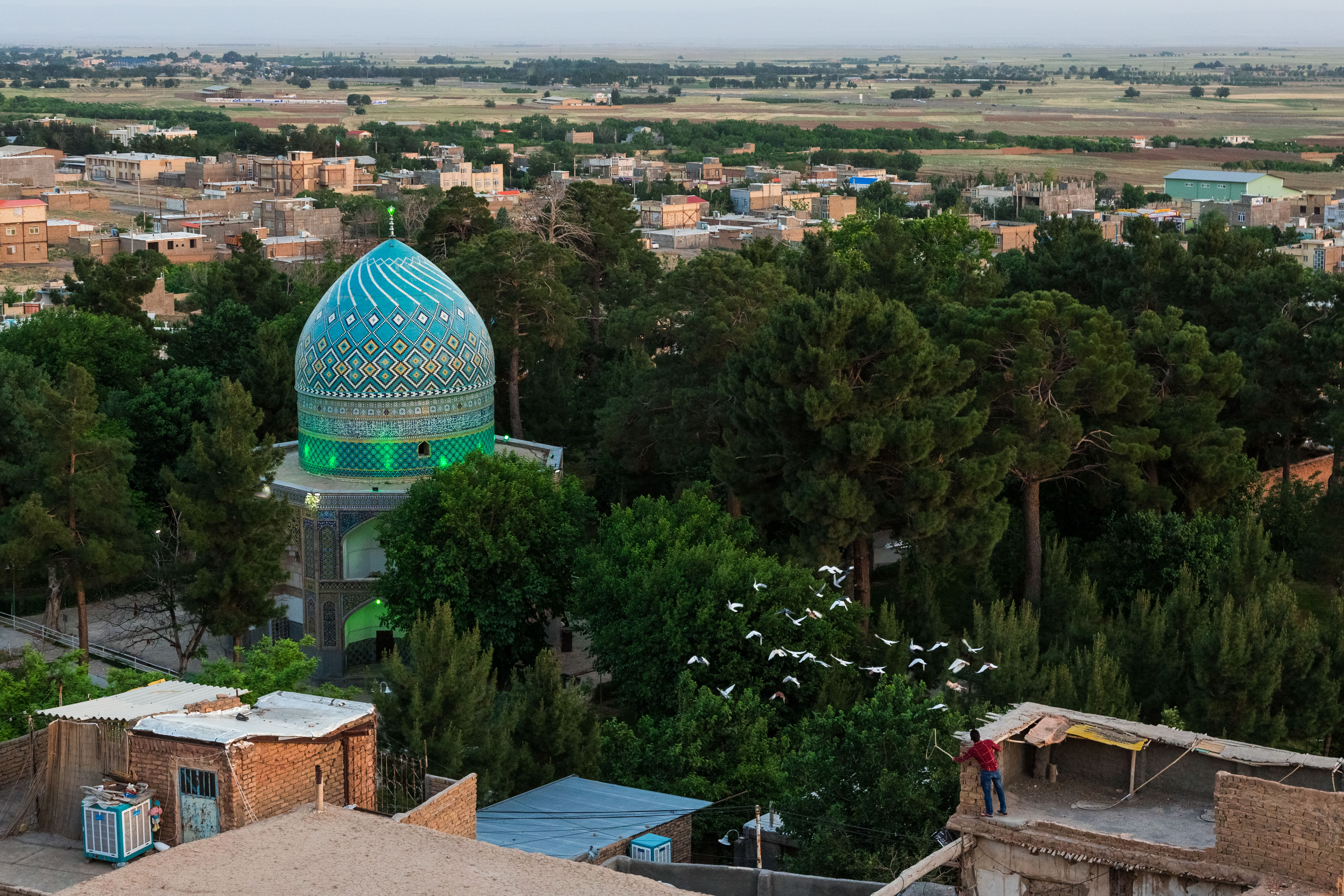

- Location within Iran
- Coordinates: 36°06′22″N 59°03′39″E
- Country: Iran
- Province: Razavi Khorasan
- County: Zeberkhan
- District: Central
- Established as a city: 1996

Population (2016)
  - Total: 3,010
- Time zone: UTC+3:30 (IRST)

Qadamgah (Persian: قدمگاه) (Note: Also romanized as Qadamgāh) is a city in the Central District of Zeberkhan County, Razavi Khorasan province, Iran, serving as capital the county. It is also the administrative center for Zeberkhan Rural District.

== History ==
Qadamgah is a Shia pilgrimage site historically associated with the city of Nishapur.

As a result of Emam al-Rida's journey from Medina to Merv, during which he traversed a significant portion of Iran, numerous qadamgahs are attributed to him. The most renowned qadamgah associated with him is located in Nishapur, constructed under the orders of Shah 'Abbas in 1611 over remnants of an earlier structure. It is widely believed that a footprint embedded in a block within the building is that of Emam al-Rida.

The majority of qadamgahs attributed to Emam Ali al-Ridha in Iran date back to the Safavid era. At least one-tenth of the 250 qadamgahs in Iran which are associated with a prophet, an emam, or a holy figure are attributed to Ali al-Ridha. Most of these qadamgahs are located along his route from Medina to Merv (the so-called "Path of Wilaya"); however, there are qadamgahs attributed to him in other regions of Iran.

The village of Qadamgah was converted to a city in 1996.

== Demographics ==
=== Population ===
At the time of the 2006 National Census, the city's population was 2,769 in 797 households, when it was capital of the former Zeberkhan District in Nishapur County. The following census in 2011 counted 2,958 people in 940 households. The 2016 census measured the population of the city as 3,127 people in 992 households.

In 2020, the district was separated from the county in the establishment of Zeberkhan County. Qadamgah was transferred to the new Central District as the county's capital.

== Gallery ==
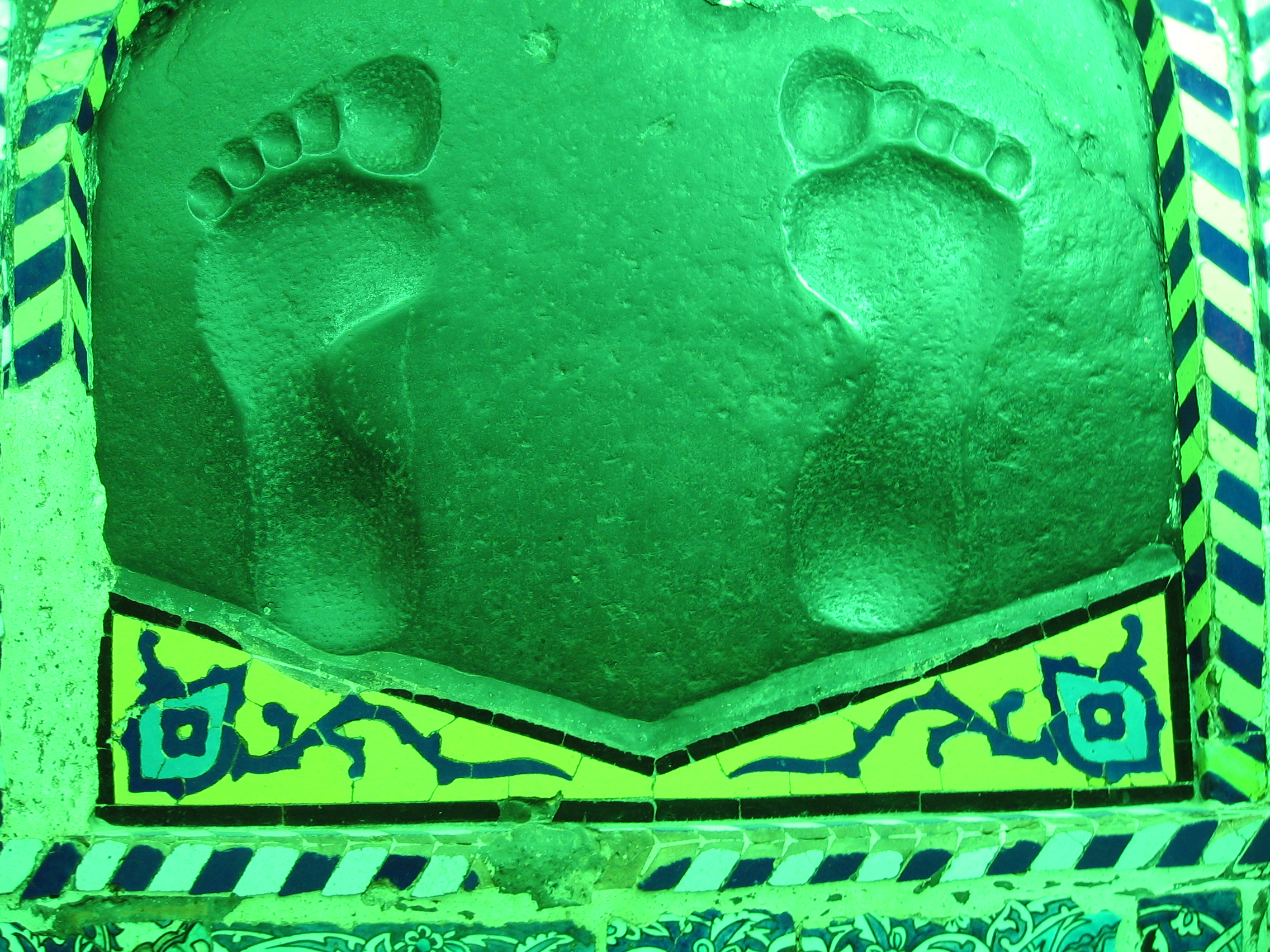
Interior view of the sacred site

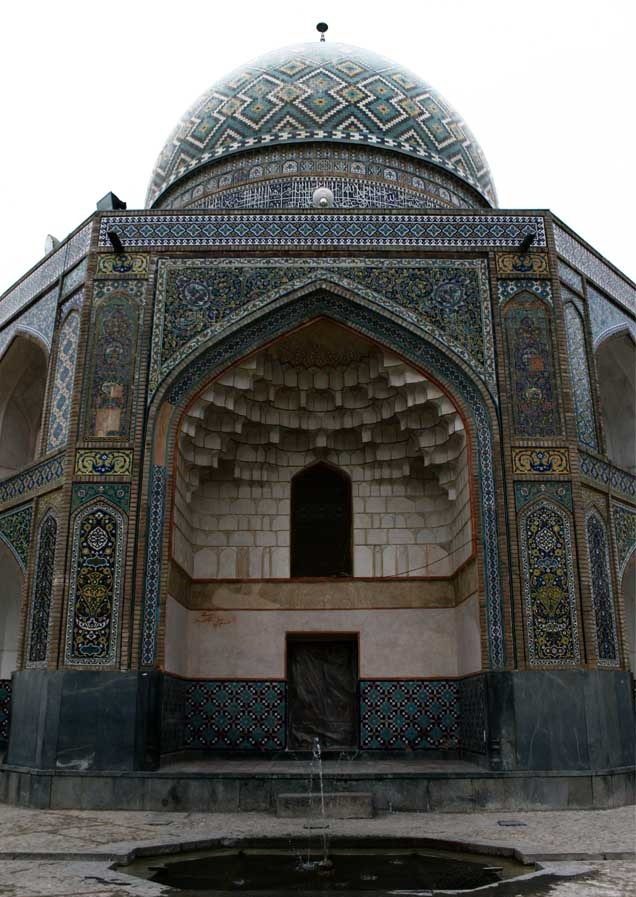
The Mosque of Qadamgah, a holy place for Shia Islam

== See also ==
Media related to Qadamgah at Wikimedia Commons
