= Kariz Now-e Sofla =

Kariz Now-e Sofla كاريزنوسفلي
- Village
- Location within Iran
- Coordinates: 35°13′53″N 60°39′00″E
- Country: Iran
- Province: Razavi Khorasan
- County: Torbat-e Jam
- Bakhsh: Central
- Rural District: Mian Jam

Population (2006)
  - Total: 701
- Time zone: UTC+3:30 (IRST)
  - Summer (DST): UTC+4:30 (IRDT)

Kariz Now-e Sofla (Persian: كاريزنوسفلي, also Romanized as Kārīz Now-e Soflá; also known as Kārīz Now) is a village in Mian Jam Rural District, in the Central District of Torbat-e Jam County, Razavi Khorasan Province, Iran. At the 2006 census, its population was 701, in 148 families.
