= Kariz-e Now, Fariman =

Kariz-e Now كاريزنو
- Village
- Location within Iran
- Coordinates: 35°35′55″N 59°38′48″E
- Country: Iran
- Province: Razavi Khorasan
- County: Fariman
- Bakhsh: Central
- Rural District: Balaband

Population (2006)
  - Total: 112
- Time zone: UTC+3:30 (IRST)
  - Summer (DST): UTC+4:30 (IRDT)

Kariz-e Now (Persian: كاريزنو, also Romanized as Kārīz-e Now) is a village in Balaband Rural District, in the Central District of Fariman County, Razavi Khorasan Province, Iran. At the 2006 census, its population was 112, in 25 families.
