= Kariz-e Now, South Khorasan =

Kariz-e Now كاريزنو
- Village
- Location within Iran
- Coordinates: 32°43′19″N 59°08′50″E
- Country: Iran
- Province: South Khorasan
- County: Khusf
- Bakhsh: Jolgeh-e Mazhan
- Rural District: Barakuh

Population (2006)
  - Total: 67
- Time zone: UTC+3:30 (IRST)
  - Summer (DST): UTC+4:30 (IRDT)

Kariz-e Now (Persian: كاريزنو, also Romanized as Kārīz-e Now, Kārīz Now, and Kārīz-i-Nau) is a village in Barakuh Rural District, Jolgeh-e Mazhan District, Khusf County, South Khorasan Province, Iran. At the 2006 census, its population was 67, in 23 families.
