= Zeberkhan Rural District =

Rural district in Razavi Khorasan province, Iran

Zeberkhan Rural District Persian: دهستان زبرخان
- Rural District
- Location within Iran
- Coordinates: 36°07′N 59°10′E
- Country: Iran
- Province: Razavi Khorasan
- County: Zeberkhan
- District: Central
- Established: 1987
- Capital: Qadamgah

Population (2016)
  - Total: 14,965
- Time zone: UTC+3:30 (IRST)

Zeberkhan Rural District (Persian: دهستان زبرخان) is in the Central District of Zeberkhan County, Razavi Khorasan province, Iran. It is administered from the city of Qadamgah.

== Demographics ==
=== Population ===
At the time of the 2006 National Census, the rural district's population (as a part of the former Zeberkhan District in Nishapur County) was 14,762 in 4,123 households. There were 15,149 inhabitants in 4,710 households at the following census of 2011. The 2016 census measured the population of the rural district as 14,965 in 4,977 households. The most populous of its 89 villages was Baghshan, with 1,914 people.

In 2020, the district was separated from the county in the establishment of Zeberkhan County, and the rural district was transferred to the new Central District.

=== Other villages in the rural district ===
- Aliabad
- Baz-e Heydar
- Chenaran
- Cheshmeh Khosrow
- Daneh Kashefiyeh
- Darudbakht
- Das
- Dizbad-e Olya
- Dowlatabad
- Garineh
- Hajjiabad
- Harimabad
- Hasanabad-e Sabrow
- Hesar
- Javadiyeh
- Kalateh-ye Luyedani
- Kalateh-ye Saru
- Kalateh-ye Soltani
- Kariz-e Now
- Khorram Beyk
- Majdabad
- Mohammadabad
- Mushan
- Pust Forushan
- Qaleh Vazir
- Qarah Dash
- Qareh Beyk
- Sakhdar
- Sartalkh
