= Cheshmeh Khosrow, Kermanshah =

Cheshmeh Khosrow چشمه خسرو
- Village
- Location within Iran
- Coordinates: 34°53′28″N 47°09′30″E
- Country: Iran
- Province: Kermanshah
- County: Sonqor
- Bakhsh: Kolyai
- Rural District: Kivanat

Population (2006)
  - Total: 125
- Time zone: UTC+3:30 (IRST)
  - Summer (DST): UTC+4:30 (IRDT)

Cheshmeh Khosrow (Persian: چشمه خسرو, also Romanized as Chashmeh-ye Khosrow; also known as Kānī Khosrow and Kāni Khusrān) is a village in Kivanat Rural District, Kolyai District, Sonqor County, Kermanshah Province, Iran. At the 2006 census, its population was 125, in 28 families.
