= Kharv =

City in Razavi Khorasan province, Iran

Kharv Persian: خرو
- City
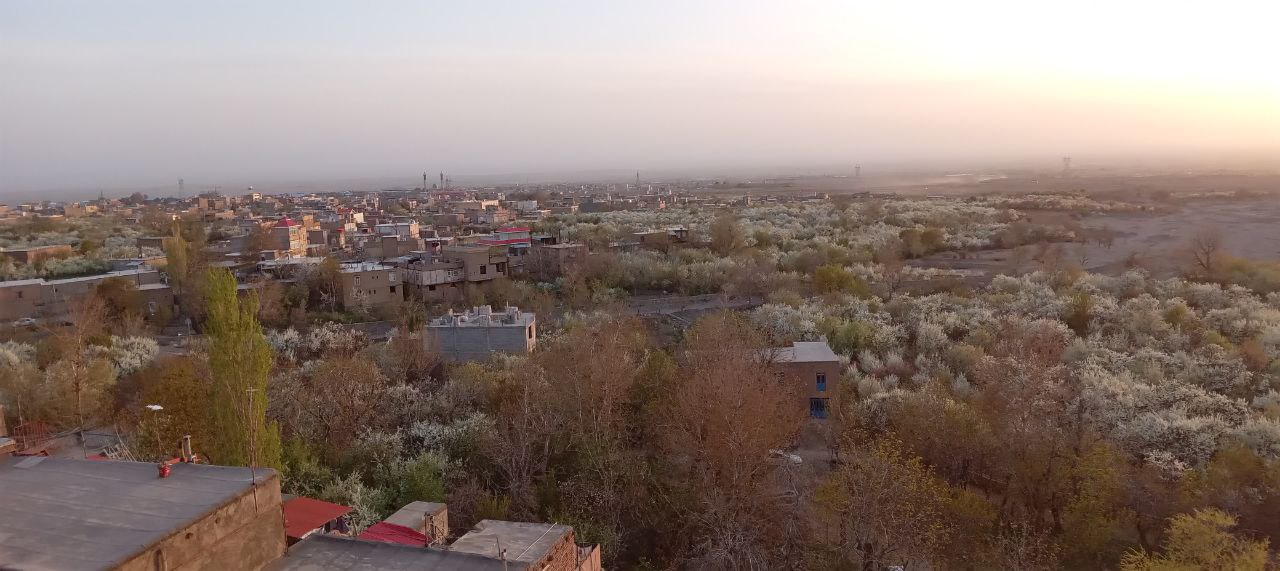
- The city of Kharv in 2022

- Location within Iran
- Coordinates: 36°08′32″N 59°00′57″E
- Country: Iran
- Province: Razavi Khorasan
- County: Zeberkhan
- District: Central
- Established as a city: 1999

Population (2016)
  - Total: 13,535
- Time zone: UTC+3:30 (IRST)
- Website: www.kharvcity.ir

Kharv (Persian: خرو) (Note: Formerly the village of Kharvin (خروین), also romanized as Kharvīn; also known as Kharv-e Bala (خرو بالا), also romanized as Kharv-e Bālā; and also known as Kharv-e ‘Olyā and Khary-e Bālā) is a city in, and the capital of, the Central District in Zeberkhan County, Razavi Khorasan province, Iran.

== History ==
In 1991, the villages of Kharv-e Olya (خرو علیا), Kharv-e Sofla (خرو سفلی), and Shahrak-e Reza (شهرک رضا) were merged to form the new village of Kharvin (خروین), which was converted to a city and renamed Kharv in 1999.

== Demographics ==
=== Population ===
At the time of the 2006 National Census, the city's population was 11,931 in 3,181 households, when it was in the former Zeberkhan District of Nishapur County. The following census in 2011 counted 14,115 people in 4,310 households. The 2016 census measured the population of the city as 13,535 people in 4,374 households.

In 2020, the district was separated from the county in the establishment of Zeberkhan County, and Kharv was transferred to the new Central District as its capital.

=== Neighborhoods ===
- Kharv-e Olya
- Kharv-e Sofla
- Sahel Borj
- Shahrak-e Reza

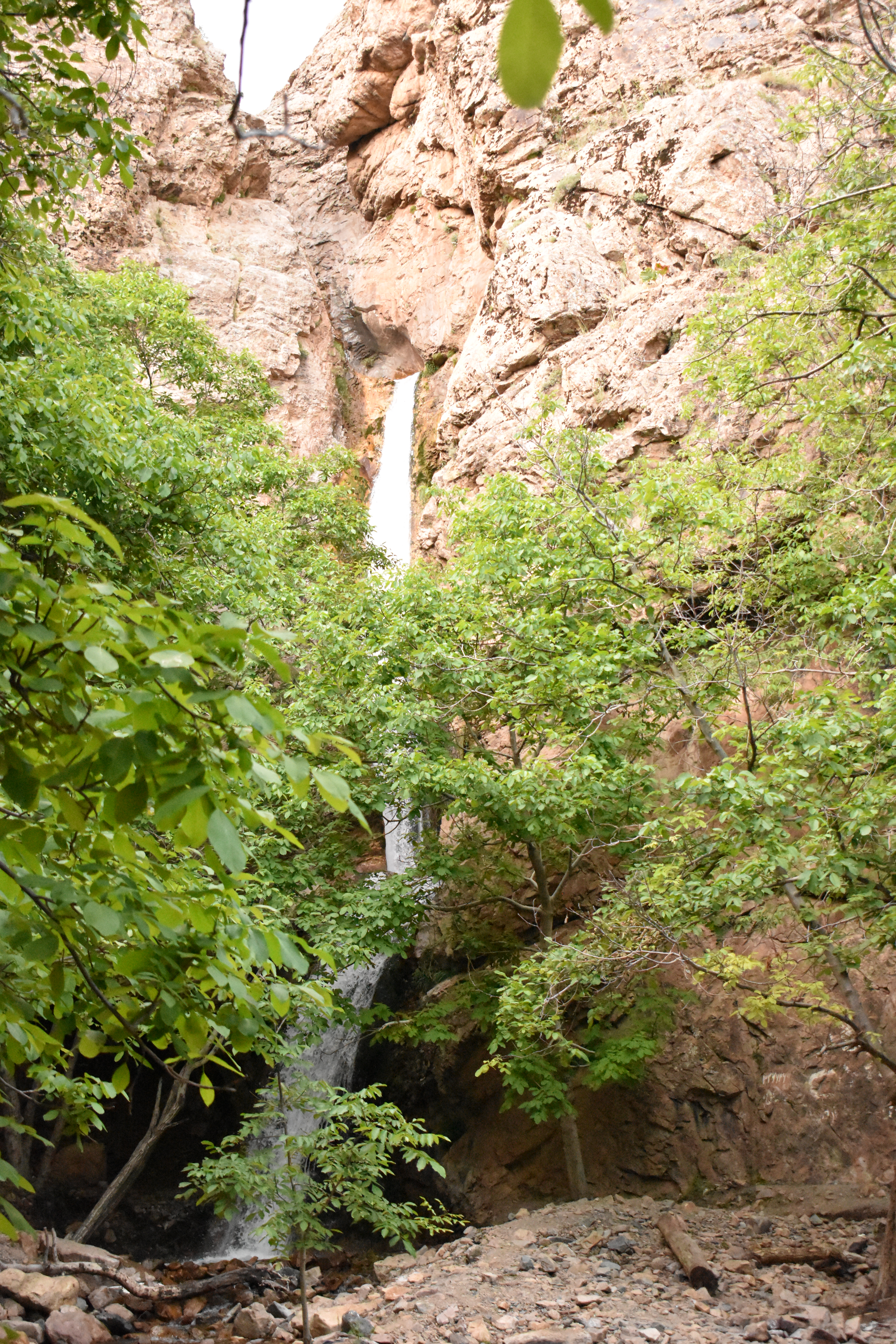
Waterfall in Kharv in 2020
