= Central District (Zeberkhan County) =

District in Razavi Khorasan province, Iran

Central District (Zeberkhan County) Persian: بخش مرکزی شهرستان زبرخان
- District
- Location within Iran
- Coordinates: 36°09′N 59°08′E
- Country: Iran
- Province: Razavi Khorasan
- County: Zeberkhan
- Established: 2020
- Capital: Kharv
- Time zone: UTC+3:30 (IRST)

The Central District of Zeberkhan County (Persian: بخش مرکزی شهرستان زبرخان) is in Razavi Khorasan province, Iran. Its capital is the city of Kharv, whose population at the time of the 2016 National Census was 3,127 in 992 households.

== History ==
In 2020, Zeberkhan District was separated from Nishapur County in the establishment of Zeberkhan County, which was divided into two districts of two rural districts each, with Qadamgah as its capital.

== Demographics ==
=== Administrative divisions ===
Central District (Zeberkhan County)
Administrative Divisions
Ordughesh RD
Zeberkhan RD
Darrud (city)
Kharv (city)
Qadamgah (city)
RD = Rural District
