= Zeberkhan County =

County in Razavi Khorasan province, Iran

Zeberkhan County Persian: شهرستان زبرخان
- County
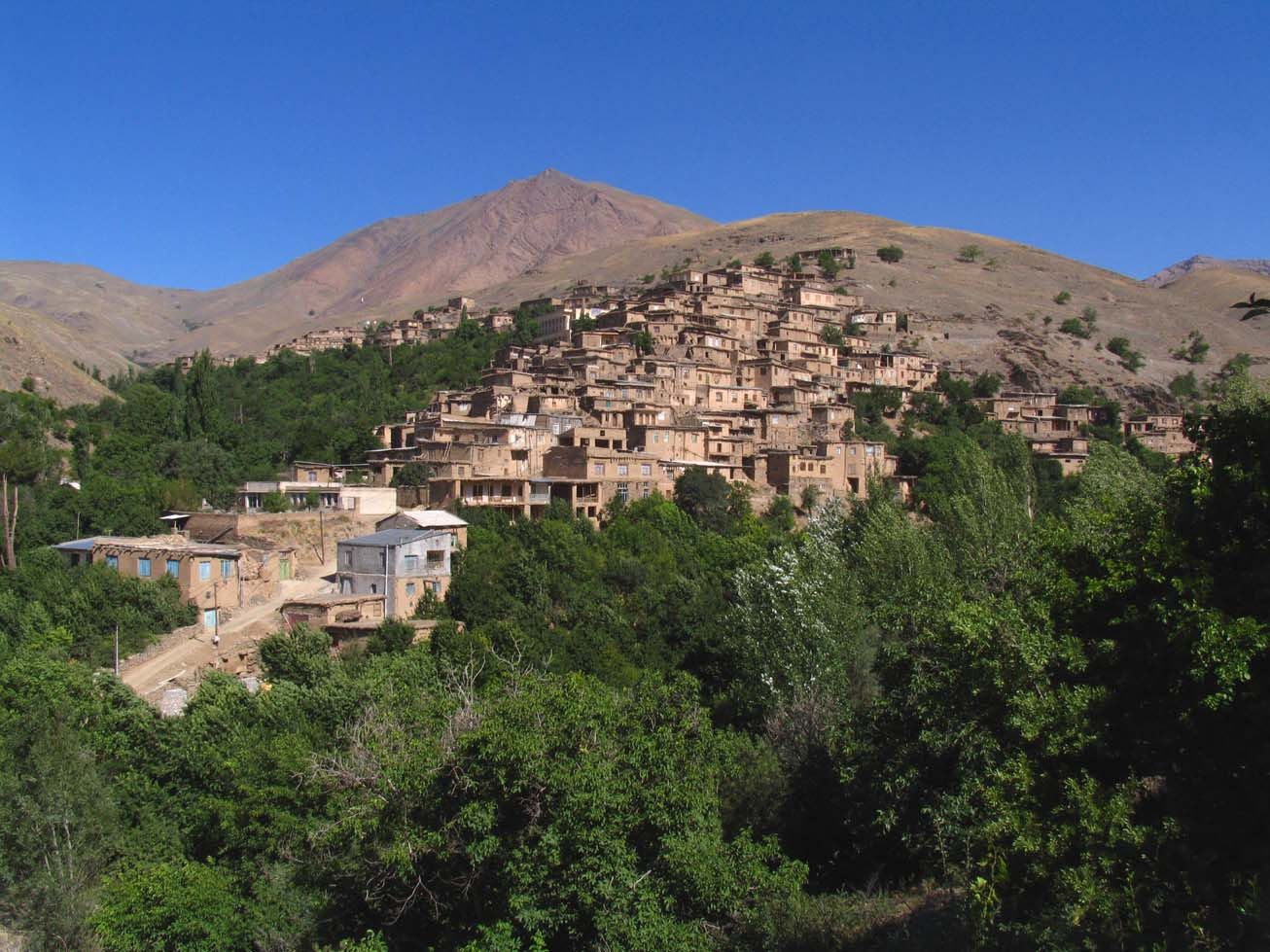
- The village of Dizbad-e Olya

- Location of Zeberkhan County in Razavi Khorasan province (center, yellow)

- Location of Razavi Khorasan province in Iran
- Coordinates: 36°05′N 59°08′E
- Country: Iran
- Province: Razavi Khorasan
- Established: 2020
- Capital: Qadamgah
- Districts: Central, Eshaqabad

Area
  - Total: 1,102 km^{2} (425 sq mi)
- Elevation: 1,250 m (4,100 ft)
- Time zone: UTC+3:30 (IRST)

Zeberkhan County (Persian: شهرستان زبرخان) is in Razavi Khorasan province, Iran. Its capital is the city of Qadamgah, whose population at the time of the 2016 National Census was 3,127 in 992 households.

== History ==
In 2020, Zeberkhan District was separated from Nishapur County in the establishment of Zeberkhan County, which was divided into two districts of two rural districts each, with Qadamgah as its capital. The village of Eshaqabad was converted to a city in 2021.

== Demographics ==
=== Administrative divisions ===
Zeberkhan County's administrative structure is shown in the following table.

Zeberkhan County
Administrative Divisions
Central District
Ordughesh RD
Zeberkhan RD
Darrud (city)
Kharv (city)
Qadamgah (city)
Eshaqabad District
Eshaqabad RD
Heshmatiyeh RD
Eshaqabad (city) (Note: Became a city after the 2016 census)
RD = Rural District

== See also ==
Media related to Zeberkhan County at Wikimedia Commons
