= Nishapur County =

County in Razavi Khorasan Province, Iran

Nishapur County Persian: شهرستان نیشاپور
- County
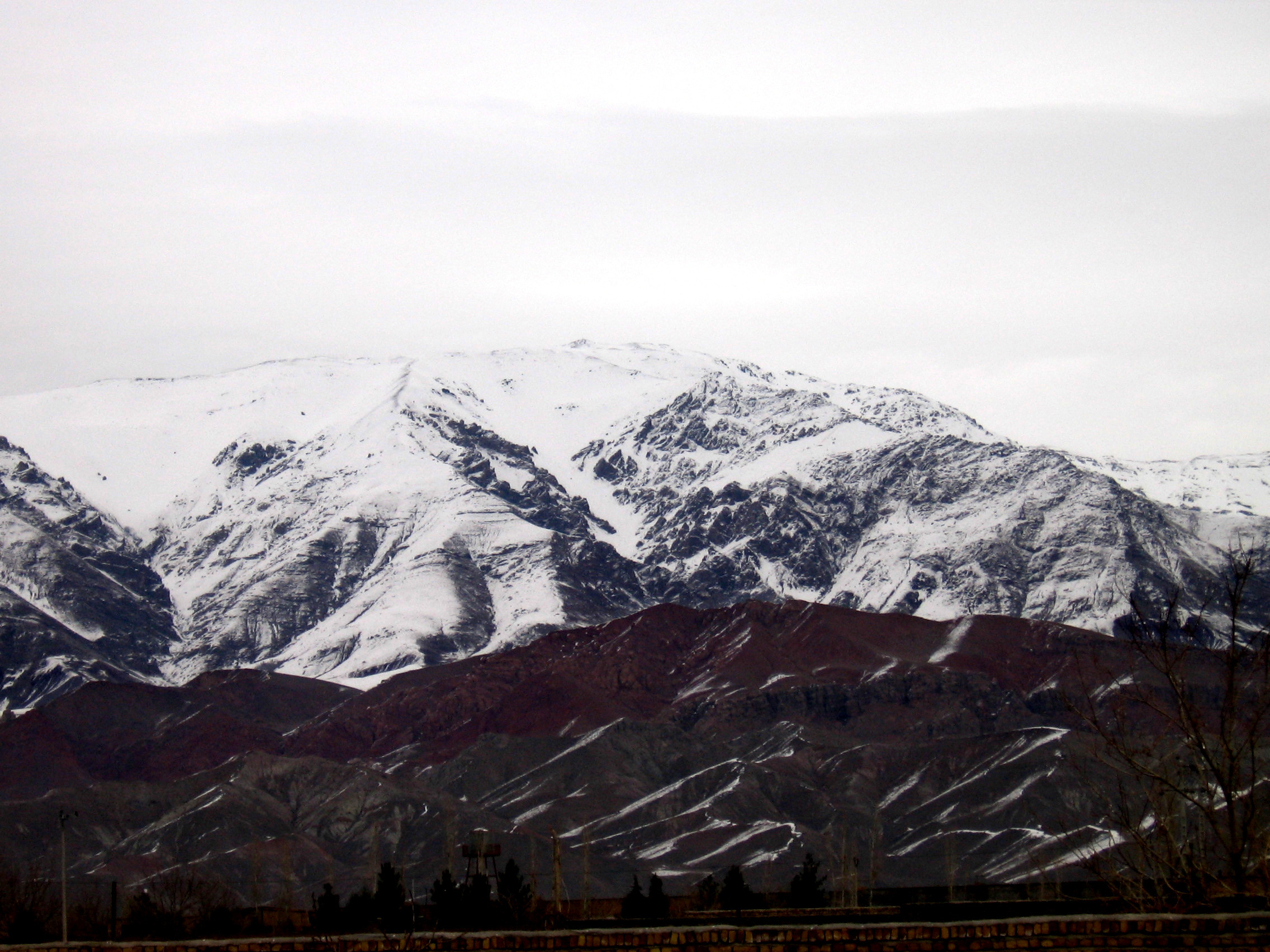
- Mount Binalud, located within the county

- Location of Nishapur County in Razavi Khorasan province (top left, pink)

- Location of Razavi Khorasan province in Iran
- Coordinates: 36°25′N 58°40′E
- Country: Iran
- Province: Razavi Khorasan
- Named for: Shapur I
- Capital: Nishapur
- Districts: Central, Sarvelayat

Area
  - Total: 5,653 km^{2} (2,183 sq mi)

Population (2016)
  - Total: 451,780
  - Density: 79.92/km^{2} (207.0/sq mi)
- Demonym: Neyshaburi
- Time zone: UTC+3:30 (IRST)

Nishapur County (Persian: شهرستان نیشاپور) (Note: Romanized as Šahrestâne Neyšhâpur; officially Šahrestâne Neyšhâbur (شهرستان نیشابور), translated as Neyshabur County) is in Razavi Khorasan province, Iran. Its capital is the city of Nishapur, the second largest city in the province and the third largest city in Eastern Iran.

== History ==
=== Nishapur massacre by the Mongols ===
The Nishapur massacre by the Mongols took place at Nishapur in April of 1221. The Mongol armies of Genghis Khan massacred the entire population of the area, which some estimates put at 1,747,000 citizens.

=== Administrative changes ===
In 2007, Binalud Rural District was separated from Takht-e Jolgeh District to join the Central District. Taghenkuh and Takht-e Jolgeh Districts were separated from the county in the establishment of Takht-e Jolgeh County. (Note: Renamed Firuzeh County) In addition, the village of Bar was converted to a city.

In 2020, Zeberkhan District was separated from the county in the establishment of Zeberkhan County. In 2023, Miyan Jolgeh District (Note: Renamed the Central District of Miyan Jolgeh County) was separated from the county to establish Miyan Jolgeh County and renamed the Central District.

== Demographics ==
=== Population ===
At the time of the 2006 National Census, the county's population was 441,184 in 118,214 households. The following census in 2011 counted 433,105 people in 128,969 households. The 2016 census measured the population of the county as 451,780 in 142,545 households.

=== Administrative divisions ===
Nishapur County's population history and administrative structure over three consecutive censuses are shown in the following table.

Nishapur County Population
Administrative Divisions	2006	2011	2016
Central District	274,700	319,576	341,182
Binalud RD		5,742	5,635
Darbqazi RD	10,411	9,854	9,528
Fazl RD	15,323	17,121	15,792
Mazul RD	30,375	34,718	33,791
Rivand RD	12,619	8,835	8,296
Bar (city)		4,121	3,765
Nishapur (city)	205,972	239,185	264,375
Miyan Jolgeh District (Note: Transferred to Miyan Jolgeh County after the 2016 census and renamed the Central District)	37,117	38,478	39,288
Belharat RD	11,677	11,896	12,074
Eshqabad RD	15,280	15,711	16,270
Ghazali RD	8,835	8,988	8,951
Eshqabad (city)	1,325	1,883	1,993
Sarvelayat District	17,962	17,445	14,664
Barzanun RD	6,032	5,693	4,764
Sarvelayat RD	10,567	9,918	8,519
Chekneh (city)	1,363	1,834	1,381
Taghenkuh District (Note: Transferred to Takht-e Jolgeh County, renamed Firuzeh County)	22,562		
Taghenkuh-e Jonubi RD	6,876		
Taghenkuh-e Shomali RD (Note: Formerly Taghenkuh Rural District)	15,686		
Takht-e Jolgeh District	34,267		
Binalud RD	7,006		
Firuzeh RD	9,292		
Takht-e Jolgeh RD	13,063		
Firuzeh (city) (Note: Formerly the village of Bozghan)	4,906		
Zeberkhan District (Note: Transferred to Zeberkhan County after the 2016 census)	54,576	57,606	56,635
Eshaqabad RD	10,110	10,623	11,234
Ordughesh RD	9,788	8,556	8,174
Zeberkhan RD	14,762	15,149	14,965
Darrud (city)	4,979	5,449	5,717
Kharv (city)	11,931	14,115	13,535
Qadamgah (city)	3,006	3,714	3,010
Total	441,184	433,105	451,780
RD = Rural District

== See also ==
Media related to Nishapur County at Wikimedia Commons
