= Zeberkhan District =

Former district in Razavi Khorasan province, Iran

Zeberkhan District Persian: بخش زبرخان
- Former District
- Location within Iran
- Coordinates: 36°05′N 59°08′E
- Country: Iran
- Province: Razavi Khorasan
- County: Nishapur
- Capital: Qadamgah

Population (2016)
  - Total: 56,635
- Time zone: UTC+3:30 (IRST)

Zeberkhan District (Persian: بخش زبرخان) is a former administrative division of Nishapur County, Razavi Khorasan province, Iran. Its capital was the city of Qadamgah.

== History ==
In 2020, the district was separated from the county in the establishment of Zeberkhan County.

== Demographics ==
=== Population ===
At the time of the 2006 National Census, the district's population was 54,576 in 14,714 households. The following census in 2011 counted 57,606 people in 17,418 households. The 2016 census measured the population of the district as 56,635 inhabitants in 18,312 households.

=== Administrative divisions ===
Zeberkhan District Population
Administrative Divisions	2006	2011	2016
Eshaqabad RD	10,110	10,623	11,234
Ordughesh RD	9,788	8,556	8,174
Zeberkhan RD	14,762	15,149	14,965
Darrud (city)	4,979	5,449	5,717
Kharv (city)	11,931	14,115	13,535
Qadamgah (city)	3,006	3,714	3,010
Total	54,576	57,606	56,635
RD = Rural District
