= El Palo Alto =

Coast redwood in Palo Alto, California

Coordinates: 37°26′50″N 122°10′13″W

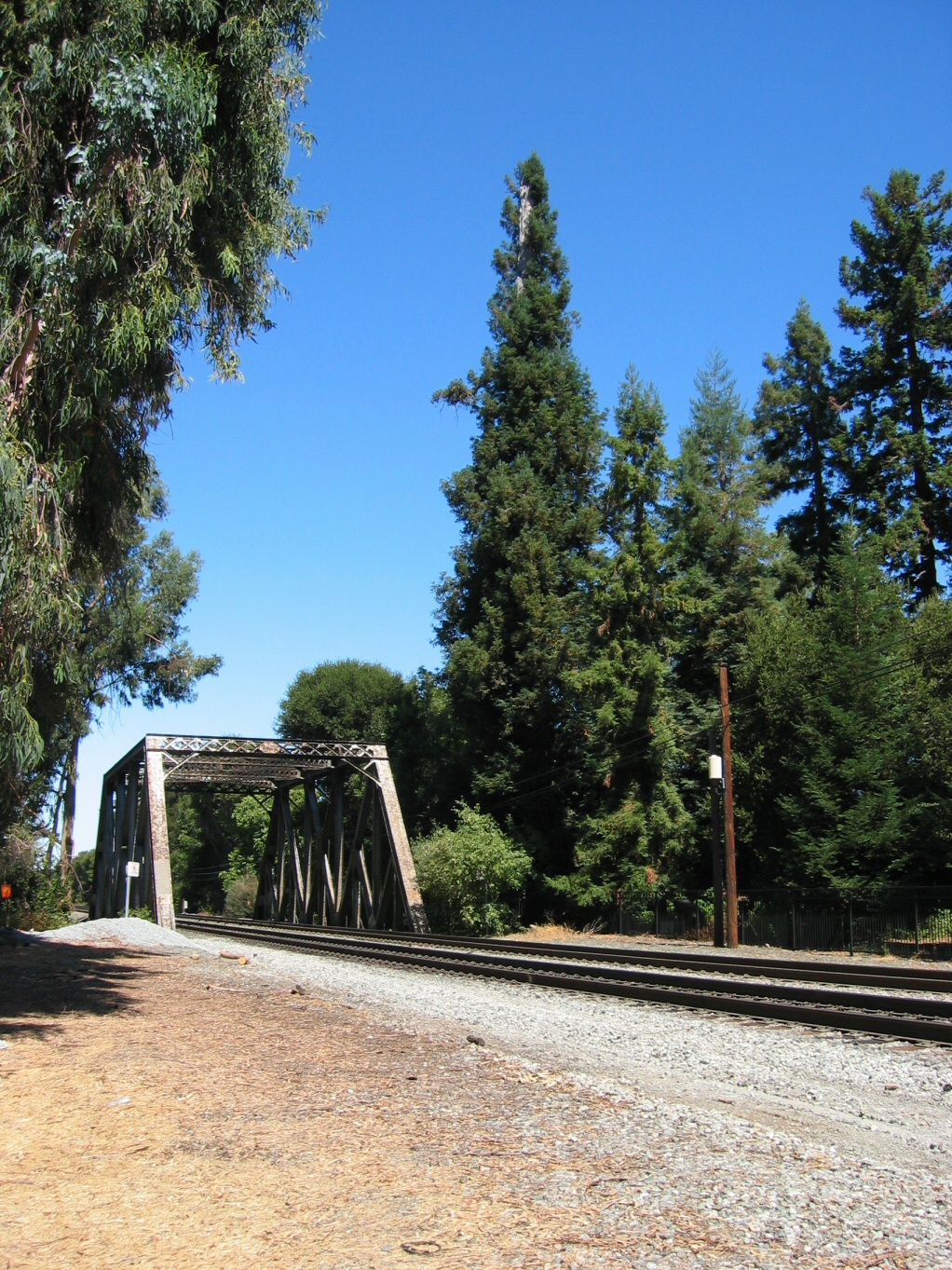
El Palo Alto, circa 2004

El Palo Alto (Spanish: 'the tall stick') is a coast redwood (Sequoia sempervirens) located on the banks of San Francisquito Creek in Palo Alto, California, a city in the San Francisco Bay Area. The namesake of the city and a historical landmark, El Palo Alto is 1085–1086 years old and stands 110 feet (34 m) tall.

Before European arrival, the land around El Palo Alto was home to the Ohlone Native Americans. Local folklore holds that El Palo Alto was a rest stop for the first European expedition that discovered San Francisco Bay, led by Spanish explorer Gaspar de Portolá in 1769. The tree became widely known with the early-1850s establishment of a highway between San Francisco and San Jose, and as a landmark along the San Francisco–San Jose railroad, construction of which passed the tree in 1863. In 1876, Leland Stanford, co-founder of Stanford University along with his wife Jane Lathrop Stanford, purchased land near El Palo Alto.

Early images and accounts indicate that El Palo Alto once had two trunks. It lost one trunk before 1883—the exact date is unknown—perhaps due to heavy rainfall and erosion of the riverbank. Fearing the tree's total loss, Leland Stanford directed that the riverbank be reinforced with a wooden bulkhead, which was replaced with concrete abutments in 1904 and again in 1911. Coal soot from steam locomotives passing below the tree suffocated the leaves of the tree's upper limbs; nearby wells lowered the water table, and by the late 1920s the tree was declared moribund. Although it has decreased in stature by some 50 ft (15 m) since the late 1800s, El Palo Alto was ultimately saved by the continuous preservation efforts of the city, local arborists, Stanford University, and Southern Pacific (the owner of the adjacent railroad); a 1997 appraisal concluded that the tree would "persevere and grow for centuries to come". El Palo Alto is featured prominently on the City of Palo Alto logo and the Stanford University seal, and is recognized by the National Arborist Association and International Society of Arboriculture as a tree of historical importance.

== Name and background ==
El Palo Alto is a coast redwood (Sequoia sempervirens), a giant and long-lived tree species only found near the North American Pacific coast. The redwood has been California's official state tree since 1937. The world's tallest trees are coast redwoods, with the record holder, Hyperion, reaching 380 ft (120 m). El Palo Alto is not so tall, at about 110 ft (34 m) as of 2021, down from 162 ft (49 m) in the 19th century. At 1085–1086 years, nor is El Palo Alto particularly old; the longest-lived redwoods may approach 2,500 years in age. Although today there are thousands of redwoods in the city of Palo Alto, El Palo Alto is one of only a few not planted by humans. Redwoods generally require wet climates like those found close to the coast, but El Palo Alto is much further inland, close to Palo Alto's northern border with Menlo Park. The tree's location next to San Francisquito Creek provided it the necessary water to survive.

== History ==
El Palo Alto germinated around AD 940, when the San Francisco Peninsula was populated by the Ohlone people, one of the indigenous peoples of California. The tree is thus contemporaneous with the Viking Age, the Five Dynasties and Ten Kingdoms period in China, or the Fatimid Caliphate in the Islamic world.

Prior to European contact, the Ramaytush speaking subgroup of the Ohlone people lived near to the tree, in the village of Puichon.

=== Portolá's expedition ===
Portola's expedition went up the Pacific coast, crossed east at Sweeney Ridge, and went south to San Francisquito Creek, to which El Palo Alto is adjacent.

Before conquest by Spanish missionaries in the 18th century, the land around El Palo Alto was home to the Ohlone. According to traditional history, El Palo Alto was the campsite of Spanish explorer Gaspar de Portolá's men between November 6 and 11, 1769. Portolá was traveling north up the California coast from Mexico in search of Monterey Bay, but failed to identify it. Nourished by Ohlone natives, the expedition continued north and on November 1 were greeted with the expanse of the San Francisco Bay. They traveled southwest and arrived at San Francisquito Creek on November 6, 1769, where they camped until November 11.

Visiting the bay in 1774, Father Francisco Palóu came upon a large tree on the creek, considered its location suitable for a new mission, and erected a wooden cross near it. His diary entry indicated the location of Portolá's camp as nearby and is the tree's first appearance in writing. In 1776, Juan Bautista de Anza and Father Pedro Font visited the tree and concluded the creek's flow was too unreliable, instead founding the Mission Santa Clara de Asís—modern day Santa Clara—15 mi (24 km) to the southeast. Font measured the tree with a graphometer: fifty varas (137 feet; 42 m) high and 5.5 varas (15 feet; 3 m) around at the base, noting that soldiers had told him there were larger ones in the mountains. A 1777 map of the bay by Font indicated a large tree on San Francisquito Creek.

Most evidence in the past suggested that El Palo Alto was not the actual tree in Font's map or referenced by early Spanish diarists, who recorded their travels in detail but made no mention of a tree with twin trunks. Local historian Steve Staiger said that Portolá's camp may have been under a tree further downstream, later felled by a Spanish military engineer to make a bridge. Two candidates for the landmark tree, elsewhere along the creek, fell in 1852 and 1911.

=== Early landmark ===
In July 1850, a highway from San Francisco in the north to San Jose to the south was ordered to be built. Previous travelers took narrow trails on horseback or slightly wider tracks on oxcart; it was joked that the road between the two cities was "three miles wide". The highway passed close to El Palo Alto and likely brought it to prominence. The tree was nearly cut down in 1850, but was saved by a timely shipment of lumber.

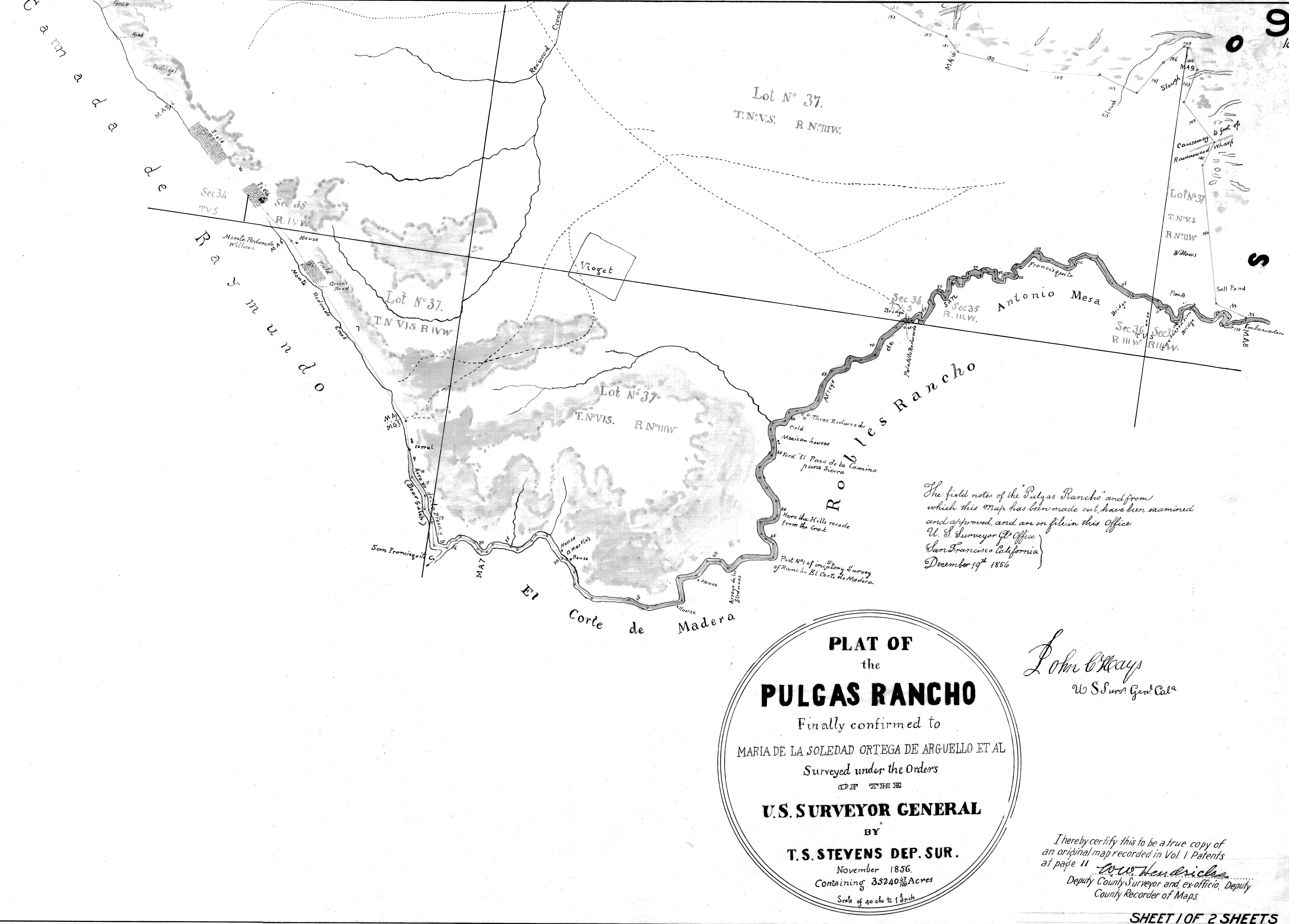
November 1856 land survey of Rancho de las Pulgas—bounded below by San Francisquito Creek—indicating the "Palo Alto Redwoods" (above "Robles Rancho")

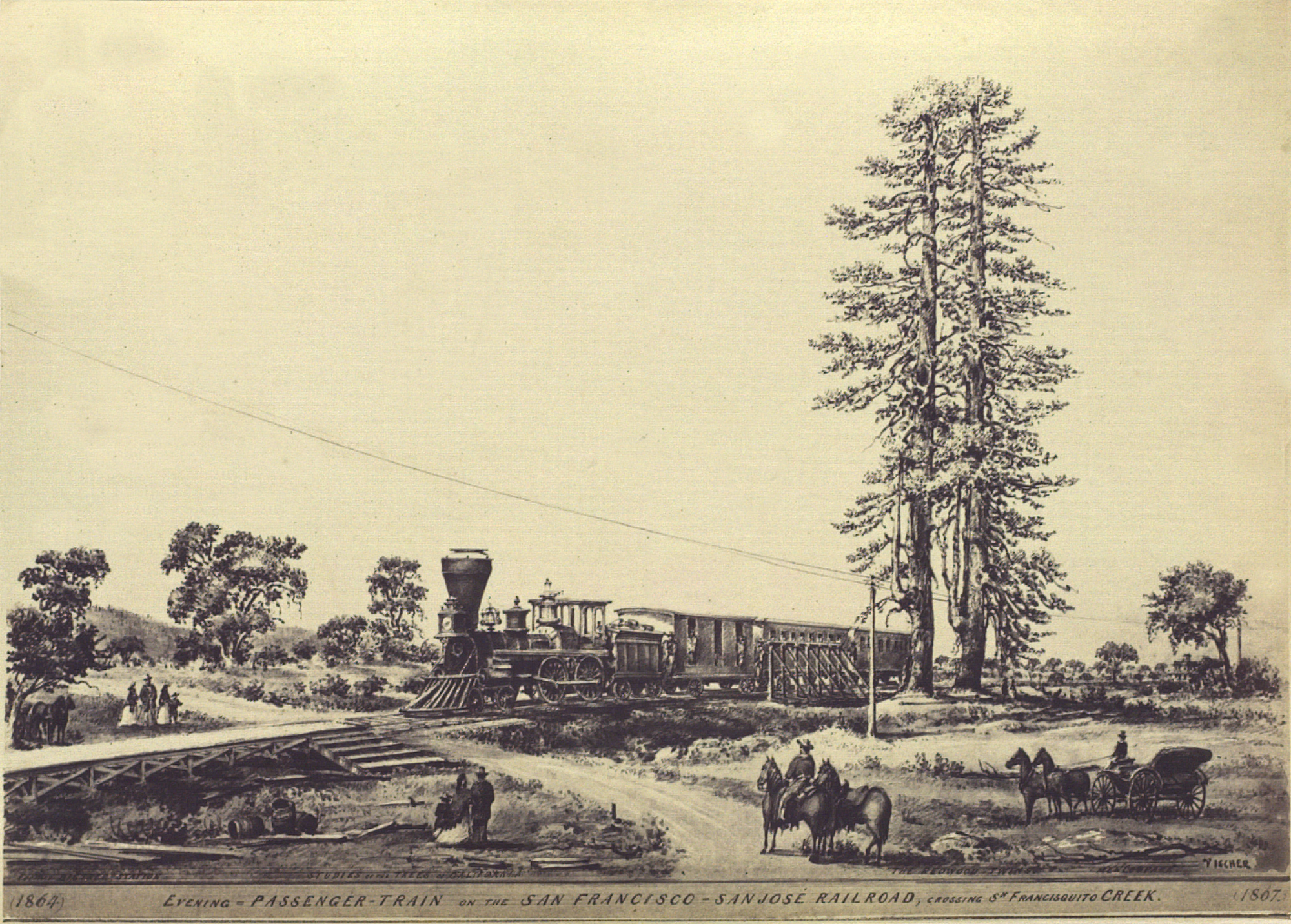
1860s drawing of El Palo Alto by Edward Vischer at "Big Tree Station"

El Palo Alto was first known as the Palos Colorados, roughly meaning 'red trees'. The earliest known reference to the name "Palo Alto" dates to 1853, and an 1856 official land survey labeled it the "Palo Alto Redwoods"; the name "Rancho of Palo Alto" was used as a disambiguation in 1857. Construction of a railroad by the San Francisco & San Jose Railroad Company, connecting San Francisco to San Jose, passed the tree in 1863, making it an obvious landmark for travelers. The section from San Francisco to "Big Tree Station" at the creek was inaugurated on October 7 that year. The Southern Pacific Transportation Company purchased the company in March 1868; the tree was featured in Southern Pacific advertising. Edward Vischer's Pictorial of California (1870) contains a drawing of the tree with two trunks, noting it to be "one of the very few instances of that mountain monarch [the redwood] being found in the open level country", and suggests that the tree originally had three trunks, describing it as "[t]wins, once a trio".

=== Land transfers and the Stanfords ===
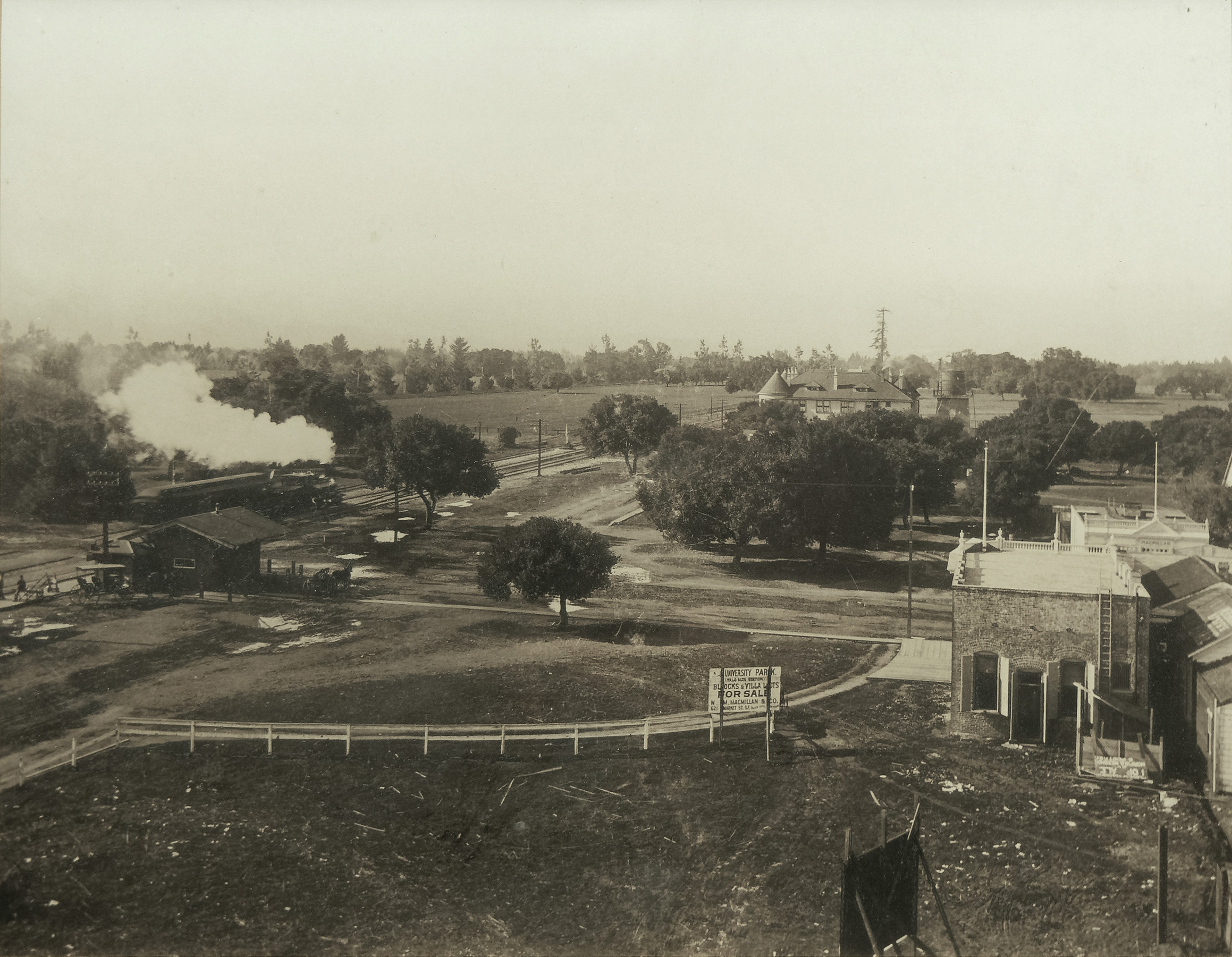
1894 view in University Park, facing northeast toward El Palo Alto in the distance

The land beneath and nearby the tree passed through various owners before becoming part of the city of Palo Alto, which did not yet exist. Some references state that the tree lay at the northwest corner of a Mexican land grant called Rancho Rinconada del Arroyo de San Francisquito, (Note: Not to be confused with Rancho Rincon de San Francisquito, an 8,500-acre (3,400 ha) property to the Rinconada grant's south.) which spanned 2,229 acres (902 ha) of oak trees and brush. This corner abutted Rancho San Francisquito to the west and Rancho de las Pulgas to the north. In 1835, the Rinconada grant was first given to Don Rafael Soto, whose father had settled in the de Anza expedition of 1775–76. Soto's widow inherited the grant in 1841. She entered a dispute with the US government—which acquired California as a state in 1850, after the Mexican–American War—over whether her claim was valid. Soto's heirs were finally declared the rightful owners in 1872, and gave the contractors who had represented them about 1,400 acres (570 ha) of land as compensation; the heirs kept the other, northern part.

In 1876, parts of Rancho San Francisquito was purchased by Leland Stanford—who later founded Stanford University with his wife Jane Stanford—for his Palo Alto Stock Farm, a place for breeding and training horses. It would eventually grow to about 8,000 acres (3,200 ha). Following the death of their son in 1884, the Stanfords established a university in his honor on their land. In 1887, Soto's heirs sold their land to a good friend of Leland Stanford, Timothy Hopkins, who used it to develop the nearby town of University Park (see 1894 view). In particular, Hopkins acquired land near El Palo Alto, adjacent to Southern Pacific–owned land, that eventually became the city-owned El Palo Alto Park. Stanford University opened on October 1, 1891, with 440 students in attendance, and prompted the rapid growth of University Park. In 1894 it incorporated as the city of Palo Alto, a new name for which Stanford had a "great fondness". The first university seal, adopted in 1908, featured El Palo Alto prominently (although its artist Arthur Bridgman Clark drew a more "vigorous" tree, how El Palo Alto might have looked centuries earlier), adorned with SEMPER to its left and VIRENS to its right as a motto. (Note: "Semper virens" is Latin for 'evergreen' or more generally, 'ever flourishing', and is found in the coastal redwood's scientific name, Sequoia sempervirens.) Yet, even as the tree became so enmeshed with the university's branding, its position east of the railroad right of way confirms that there never was a time when El Palo Alto was on land owned by Leland Stanford.

=== One trunk falls ===
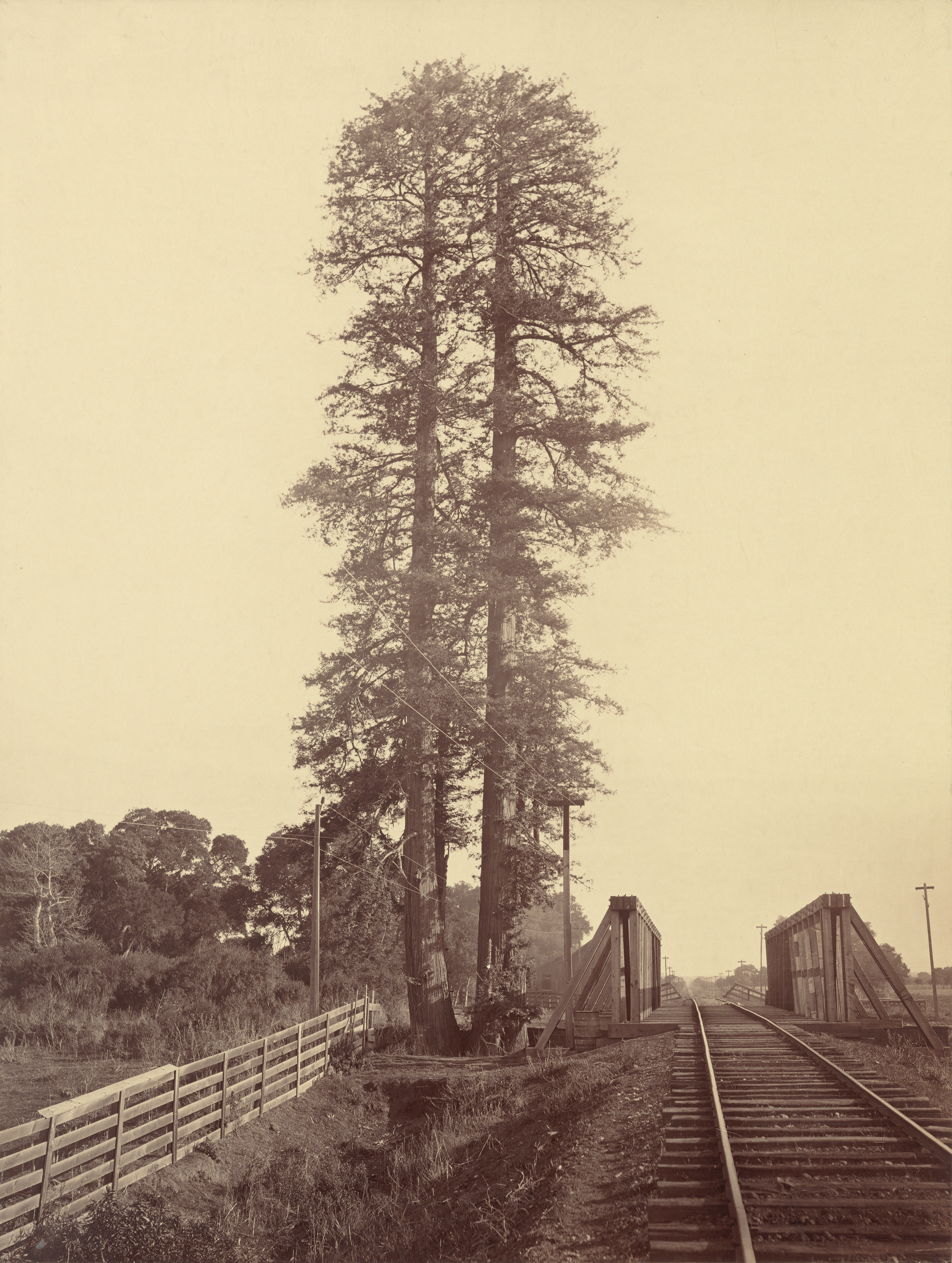
In the 1870s, by Carleton Watkins; the tree's earliest known photograph. The left trunk would fall.

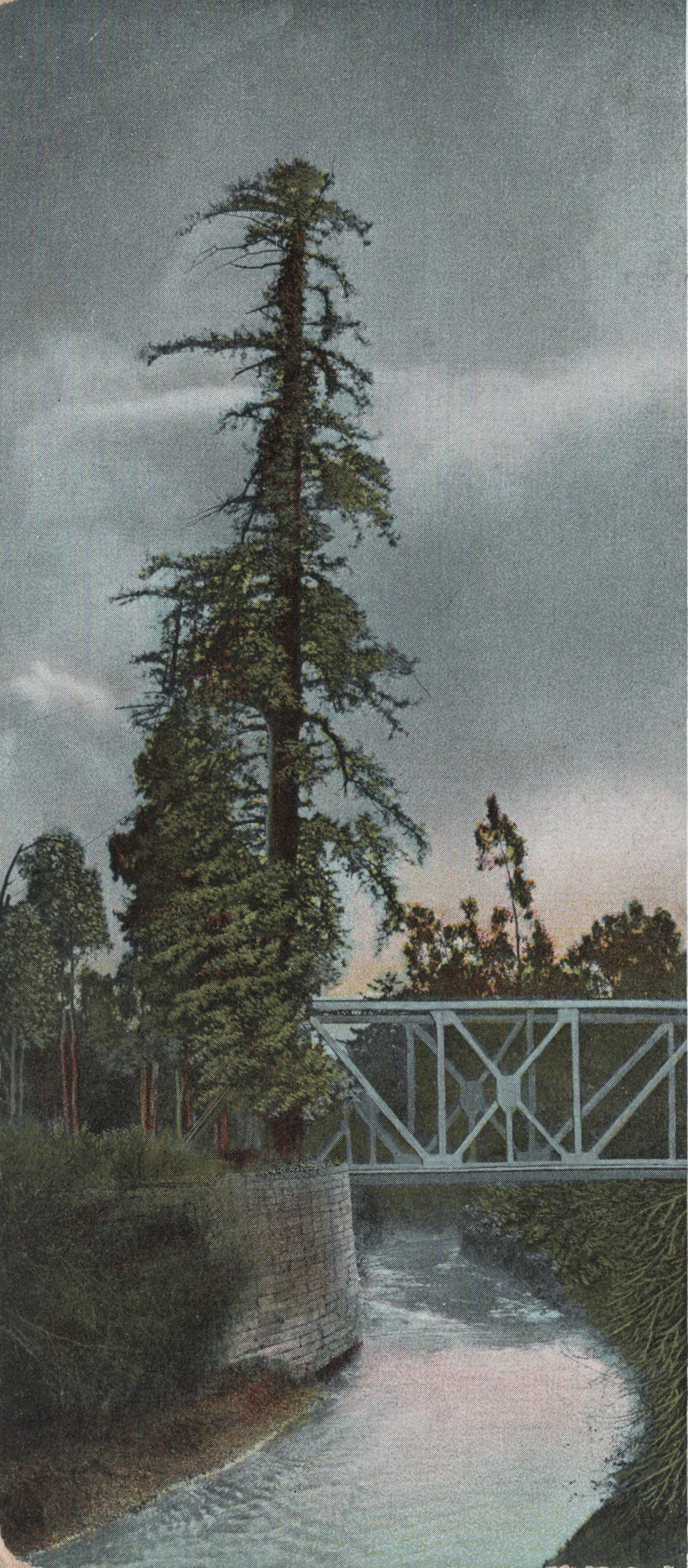
c. 1904, first wall

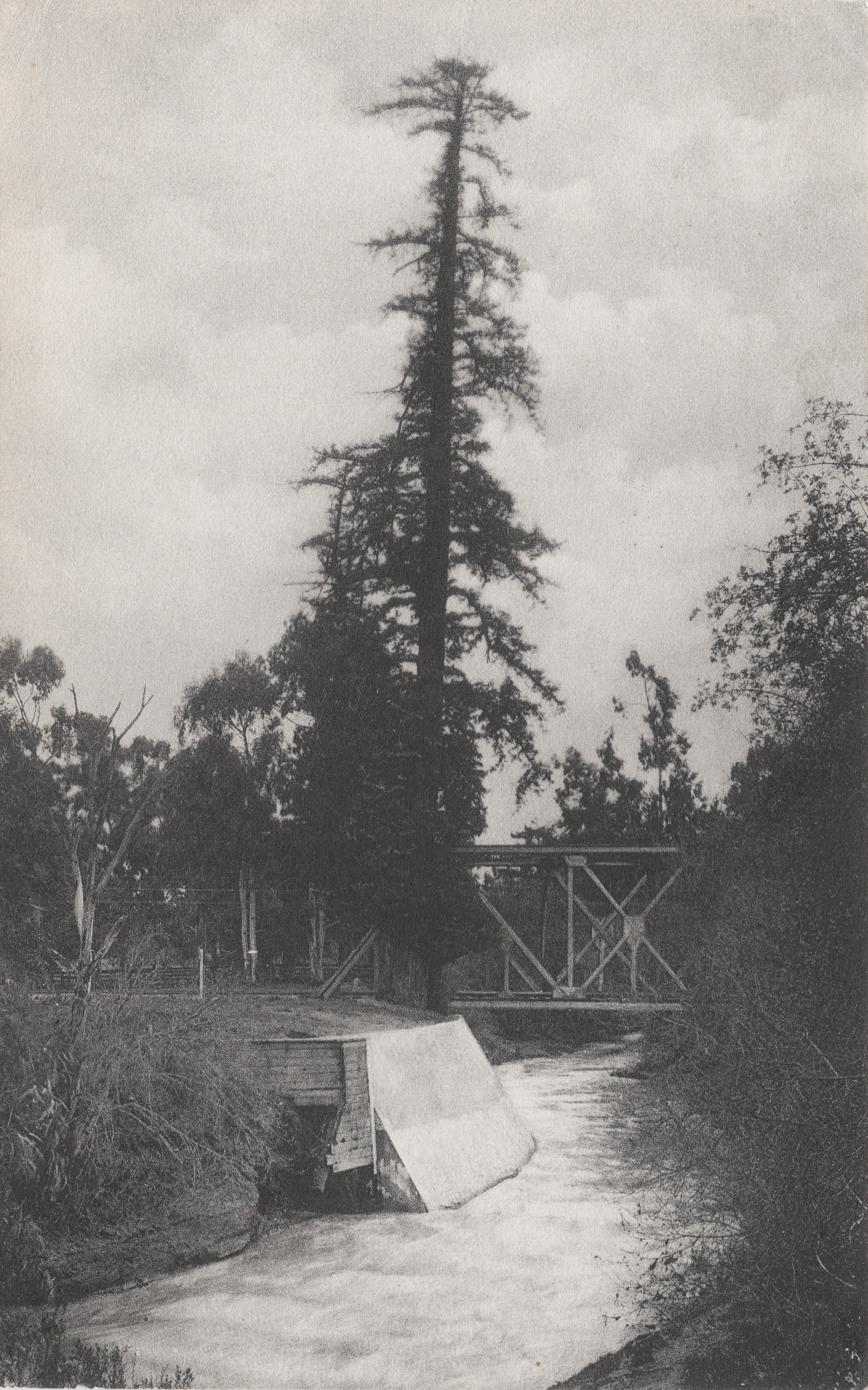
c. 1918, showing concrete buttress

El Palo Alto had two trunks until some time between 1875 and 1882, when the north, more-curved trunk fell. The stump's rings were counted and gave an age of 967 years.

The exact date and cause of the trunk's falling had been thought to be unknown. A 1900 article in Palo Alto Live Oak dates the falling to the winter of 1879, blaming a freshet. A December 1882 article in The Sacramento Bee states: "Some years ago it had a companion tree, but the latter was undermined by a subterranean stream and fell to the ground." Local historian Guy Miller studied the matter for over two decades and estimated a date of 1885. Miller suggested that railroad records likely to contain definitive information were destroyed in the 1906 San Francisco earthquake and subsequent fire.

San Mateo Times clipping from November 1875 on a fallen tree after a rainstorm

However, in a Palo Alto Historical Association talk on October 6, 2024, and in a follow up article in the Palo Alto Historical Association newsletter, Jeff Watt, a local Palo Alto electrical engineer, presented evidence that one of the twin trees likely fell in 1875. He presented a clipping from the Nov 20, 1875 issue of the San Mateo Times that referred to a large redwood growing next to the San Francisquito creek falling during the recent severe rainstorm (6 inches of rain). The article adds that "This tree was one of two giant redwoods growing near each other." Jeff also presented photographs showing only a single trunk for the tree after this date.

The San Francisquito Creek's eroding banks further threatened El Palo Alto. Fearing its loss, after the first trunk fell, Leland Stanford directed a wooden bulkhead to be built reinforcing the tree's side of the creek. In 1904 Jane Stanford ordered the building of a cement wall, which was further reinforced around 1909 by Southern Pacific. (Note: An April 23, 1920 blueprint for additional curbing, which also illustrates the existing concrete structure, may be found in the Stanford University catalog.)

Early Stanford students had a tradition of climbing the tree and placing a flag as high as possible. The day before admissions day of 1909, a Stanford student (or possibly an employee) was marooned and had to be rescued by other students at night time, marking the last known climb.

=== Declining health ===
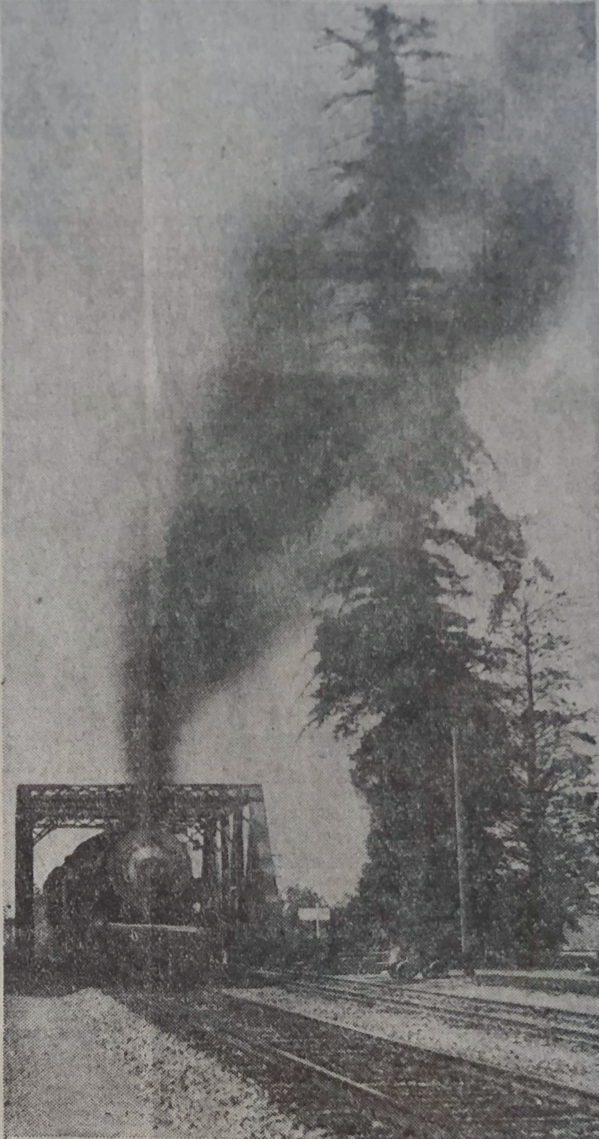
Train passes El Palo Alto in 1929

Smog and disruption of roots from the railroad placed El Palo Alto under existential threat; the adjacent railroad was doubled to two tracks in 1902 and by the 1920s the tree was passed by some 70 trains per day. Nearby wells and water being taken from San Francisquito Creek lowered the water table, depriving the tree of needed water. Stanford botany professor George James Peirce already found in 1901 that the tree's crown was seriously injured, that the railway had caused changes in the nearby soil's drainage, and that a "thicket of suckers" was present around the tree, akin to those seen "around the stump of a felled or fallen redwood of advanced age." In 1915 Peirce planted seven redwoods on university grounds so that one of them could succeed El Palo Alto following its death. Six remain—one was crushed as a sapling by a lawnmower.

The Native Sons of the Golden West, an organization dedicated to the preservation of California landmarks, took stewardship of the tree in 1920. Southern Pacific leased the tree to the Native Sons in 1922 and in 1925 the surrounding land was converted into a park, now El Palo Alto Park. The park spans 0.5 acres (0.20 ha) and has a pedestrian-bike pathway connecting Palo Alto to Menlo Park. University tree surgeons filled decayed cavities with cement and the tree's base was irrigated using six-inch pipes, sunk eight feet into the earth at regular intervals. Southern Pacific hooked up guy wires to stabilize the tree.

Fearing the tree's death, the Native Sons placed a plaque (Note: The sign reads in full: Under this giant redwood, the Palo Alto, November 6 to 11, 1769, camped Portola and his band on the expedition that discovered San Francisco Bay. This was the assembling point for their reconnoitering parties. Here in 1774 Padre Palou erected a cross to mark the site of a proposed mission (which later was built at Santa Clara). The celebrated Pedro Font topographical map of 1776 [sic] contained the drawing of the original double trunked tree making the Palo Alto the first official living California landmark. Placed by the Historic Landmark Committee Native Sons of the Golden West Nov 7 1926) set in a granite boulder under the tree in 1926, in a ceremony attended by more than a thousand people and featuring speeches from the mayor, a Stanford professor, a Southern Pacific representative, and several Native Sons. Despite continuous preservation efforts, by the late 1920s newspapers declared the tree moribund. The top of the tree continued to die and measurements in 1950 found a height of 135 ft (41 m), compared to 162 ft (49 m) in 1930.

=== Recovery ===
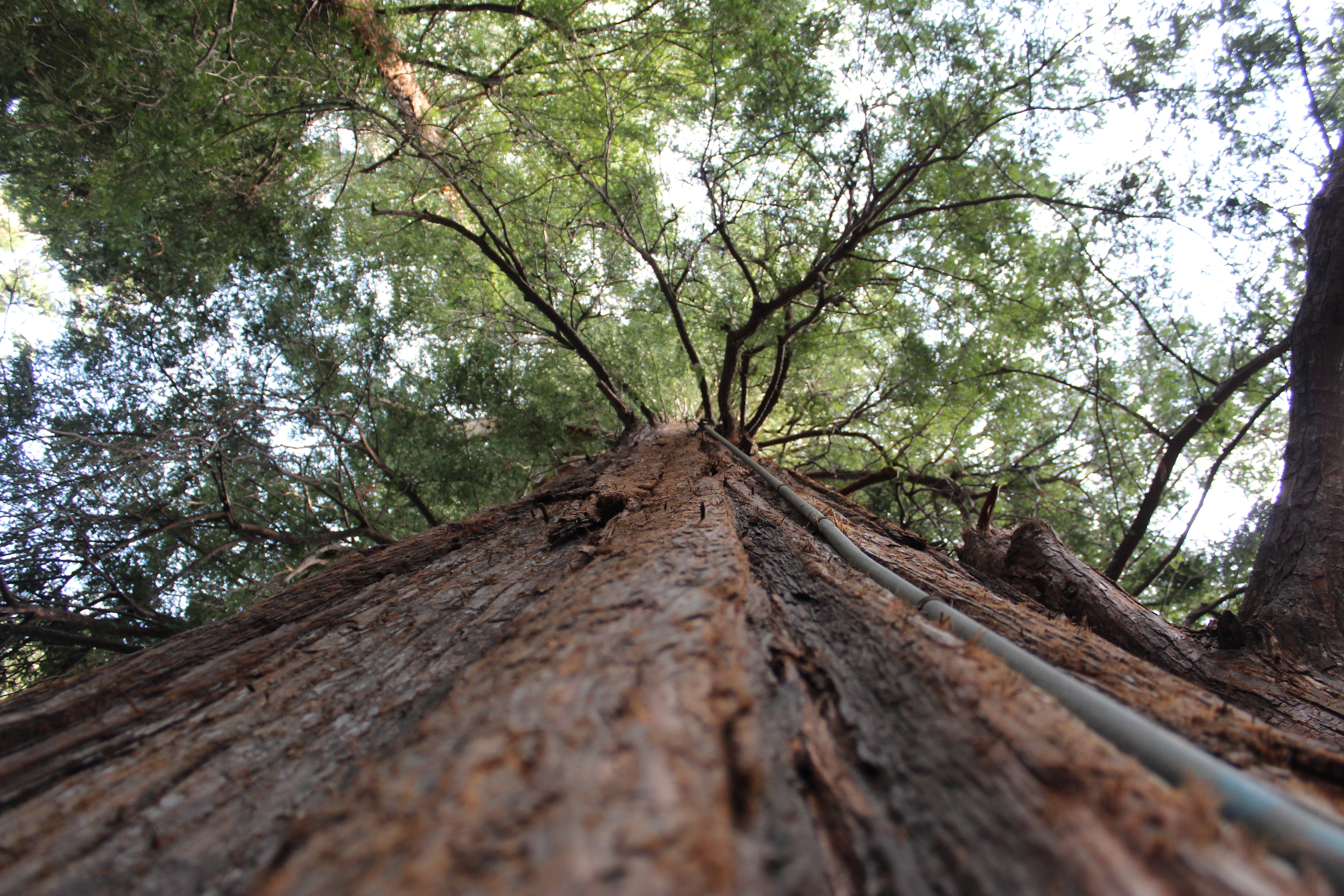
Irrigation system for El Palo Alto

A watering system—dubbed the "Fool the Redwood Plan" by a caretaker—was installed in 1955 to simulate the moisture that redwoods get in their typical habitat, and to wash soot off the foliage; dead branches were removed during installation. A Jeep-mounted pump was used twice a month to pump water for two hours up the line, which reached 10 ft (3.0 m) above the tree. It soon became clogged and bent out of shape by high winds, but was fixed in 1958 in a collaboration with the city fire department. In 1961 six local arborists together deemed the tree to be in fair condition, but suffering from smog, insufficient water, termites, and a deteriorating root system. Smaller, "nurse" trees were planted to protect El Palo Alto's root system from compacted soil. Dead wood and termite infestations were progressively removed, mulch was added at the tree's base, and the tree's top was cut off as it died.

El Palo Alto Park was officially named and made a city park in June 1971. With their disbandment in 1974, the Native Sons' lease of the land immediately around the tree from Southern Pacific expired. The city of Palo Alto, who had long cared for the tree, had incorrectly assumed they were part of the lease. The city sent Southern Pacific a new lease in 1978.

The switching of nearby cities to the Hetch Hetchy water system incidentally let the water table return. Together with watering and fertilization efforts the tree was finally adorned with new growth. A 1999 appraisal concluded that "notwithstanding a catastrophic event ... it is expected that the El Palo Alto redwood will persevere and grow for centuries to come."

== Legacy ==
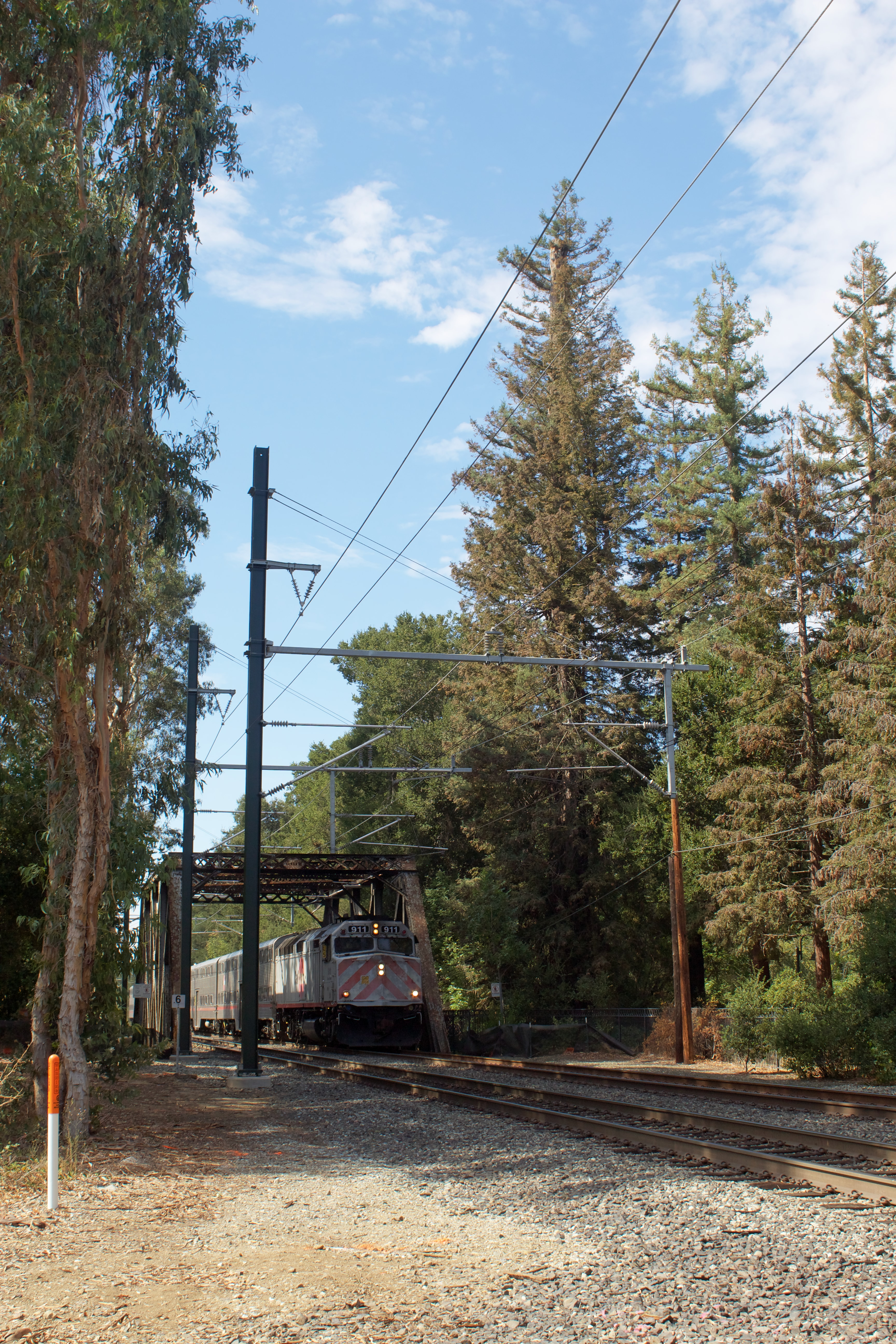
With Caltrain and new electric overhead lines, facing north, 2022

Once a lone tall tree visible for miles, (Note: A traveler from San Francisco, Concepción Fuller Ramirez, remembered of an 1837 visit "the two noble trees intertwined like brothers towering high above the oaks and buckeyes." Emory E. Smith in Palo Alto Live Oak said it once could be seen from Rincon Hill, San Francisco, 33 mi (53 km) down the road to San Jose, on a clear day.) the tree's decline and the growth of nearby planted trees, such as eucalyptus, have made El Palo Alto much less visible from afar. El Palo Alto stands at about 110 ft (34 m) in height, with a 90 in (230 cm) diameter and crown spread of 40 ft (12 m), and enjoys much greater health than it did a century ago. Preservation efforts continue, including with ground-penetrating radar, "air-spade excavation", drone monitoring of the tree's crown, and a prism attached to its top to track movement. Caltrain made the railroad electric in 2024, eliminating the impact of smoke, and will replace the 1902 trestle.

The tree remains prominent on the City of Palo Alto seal, in the Stanford University seal, and as a mascot in the university's marching band. The State of California designated the nearby "Portolá Journey's End" as the second California Historical Landmark in 1932; in 1974 the tree itself was registered with the state as a Point of Historical Interest. In 1987 the National Arborist Association and the International Society of Arboriculture recognized the tree for its historical importance. In 2004, seedlings from El Palo Alto were planted in the American Forests Historic Tree Nursery in Jacksonville, Florida.

== See also ==
- List of individual trees
