= Los Trancos Open Space Preserve =

Midpeninsula Regional Open Space District

Coordinates: 37.3264°N 122.1794°W

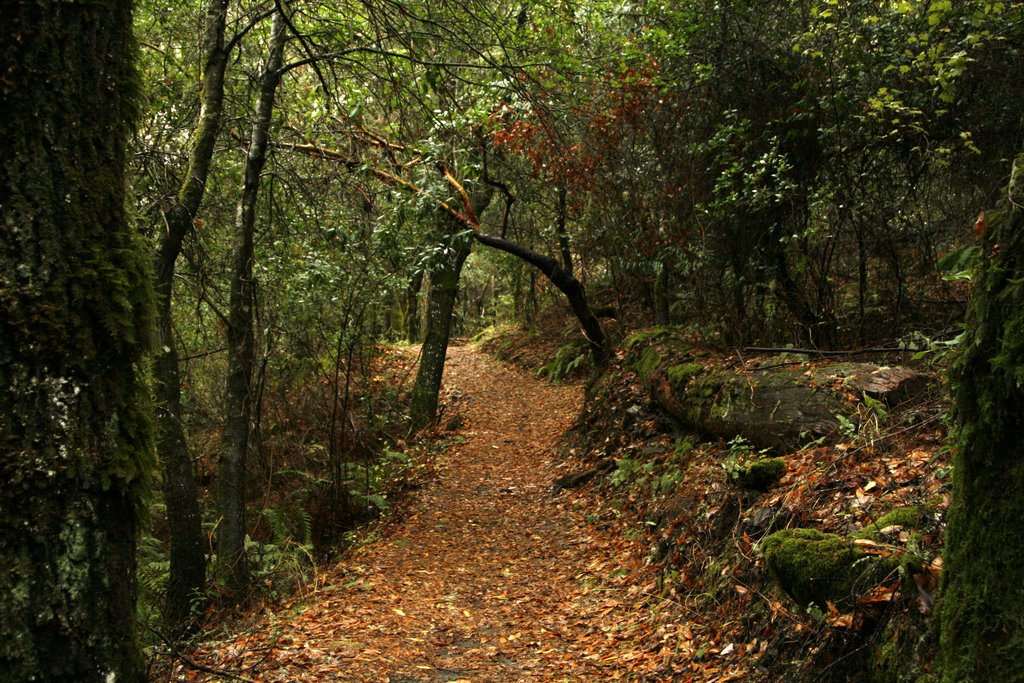
One of the many trails at Los Trancos Open Space Preserve

Los Trancos Open Space Preserve is a 274-acre (1.11 km^{2}) open space preserve, located in San Mateo and Santa Clara Counties, California, near Los Altos Hills, California. The preserve contains about 5 miles (8 km) of hiking trails, of which 2.1 miles (3.4 km) are open to equestrians, and none are open to bicycles.

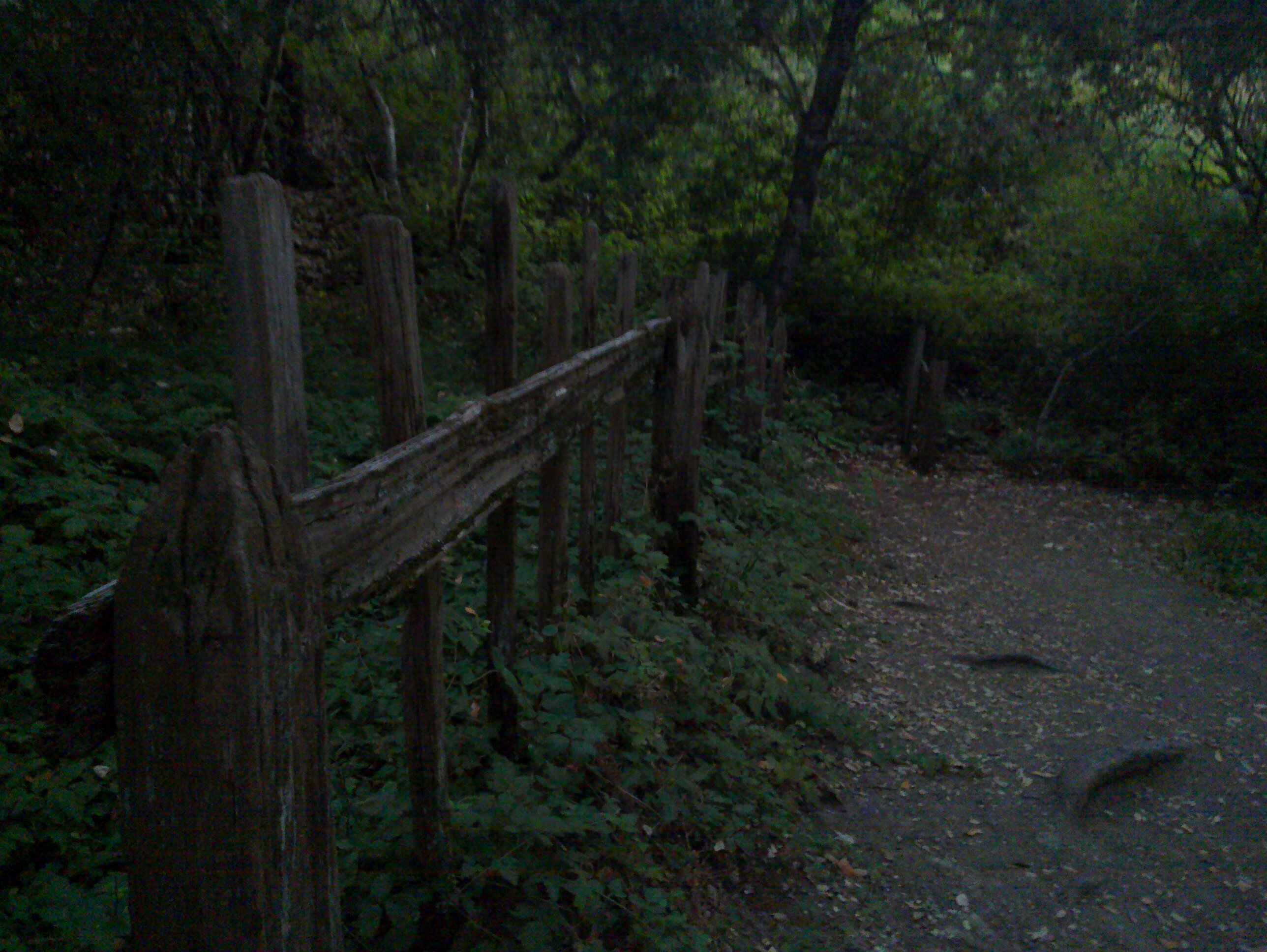
Fence moved because of 1906 earthquake

The area was once a part of a 13,300 acre (53.8 km^{2}) rancho. The preserve's acreage was purchased by state senator Louis Oneal in the early 1900s, who raised horses there. It was sold to a developer in the 1950s. Power and water lines were run to the property in the 1960s, but development was abandoned when the city of Palo Alto discovered the high cost of providing city services to the area. The preserve was acquired by the Midpeninsula Regional Open Space District in 1976.

While the preserve is relatively small compared to other preserves and parks in the area, it has one notable feature: about one mile (1.5 km) of the San Andreas Fault runs underneath it. Several series of markers throughout the preserve indicate where the ground has broken during various earthquakes.

Additionally, a 1.5-mile (2.4 km) trail follows the main break caused by the 1906 San Francisco earthquake. This trail includes several interpretive stations that point out various quake-caused features and phenomenon. Guided "quake walks" are held about once a month.

Just northwest of Page Mill Road, the preserve protects the headwaters of Los Trancos Creek, a tributary of San Francisquito Creek.
