= Rancho Ojai =

Mexican land grant in Ventura County, California

Coordinates: 34.440°N 119.250°W

Rancho Ojai was a 17,717-acre (71.70 km^{2}) Mexican land grant in present-day Ventura County, California given in 1837 by Governor Juan Alvarado to Fernando Tico. Rancho Ojai is located on the east side of the upper Ventura River, across from the Rancho Santa Ana grant made in the same year. The grant encompassed present-day city of Ojai, at the foot of the Topatopa Mountains.

== History ==
Fernando Tico (d. 1862) married María Margarita López in 1821. By 1829, Tico had served as alcalde of Santa Barbara. López died in 1834, and he remarried, to María de Jesus Silvestra Ortega. Tico was granted the four square league Rancho Ojai grant in 1837. In 1845, Tico was granted 29 acres (0.1 km^{2}) immediately to the west of the church at Mission San Buenaventura by Governor Pío Pico. In 1855, Tico (along with José Ramón Malo and Pablo de la Guerra) was elected to the first Santa Barbara County Board of Supervisors.

With the cession of California to the United States following the Mexican-American War, the 1848 Treaty of Guadalupe Hidalgo provided that the land grants would be honored. As required by the Land Act of 1851, a claim for Rancho Ojai was filed with the Public Land Commission in 1852, and the grant was patented to Fernando Tico in 1870.

In 1853, Tico sold the rancho to Henry Starrow Carnes of Santa Barbara. Carnes was a lieutenant in Stevenson's 1st Regiment of New York Volunteers. In 1856, Carnes sold the rancho to Juan Camarillo. In 1864, Camarillo sold the rancho to John Bartlett. (Camarillo then bought Rancho Calleguas.) In the first subdivision of the grant, Bartlett sold one third to John B. Church, and the remaining two thirds to John Wyeth in 1865. Church and Wyeth were associates of Thomas R. Bard, representing Thomas Alexander Scott of the Philadelphia and California Petroleum Company. In 1874, the valley's first settlement was named Nordhoff in honor of an east coast journalist Charles Nordhoff who had publicized this special area. Not until 1917 did the town become known as Ojai.
