= Rancho Santa Ana =

Mexican land grant in Ventura County, California

Coordinates: 34.400°N 119.330°W

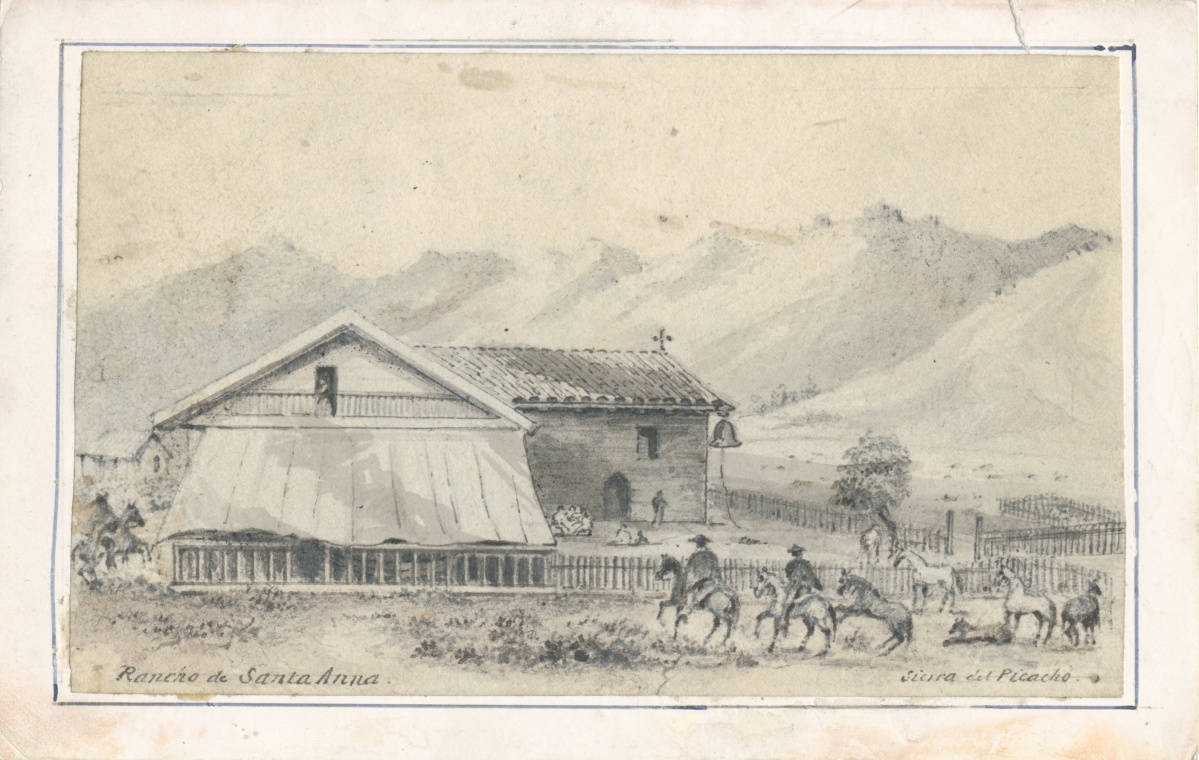
Drawing of Rancho de Santa Ana by Edward Vischer.

Rancho Santa Ana was a 21,522-acre (87.10 km^{2}) Mexican land grant in present day Ventura County, California given in 1837 by Governor Juan Alvarado to Crisogono Ayala and Cosme Vanegas. Rancho Santa Ana was located inland in the Ventura River Valley on the west side of the Ventura River across from Rancho Ojai which was granted in the same year. Rancho Santa Ana encompassed present day Lake Casitas and Oak View.

== History ==
The four square league Rancho Santa Ana was granted to Crisógono Ayala and his father-in-law Cosme Vanegas was part of the lands of Mission San Buenaventura. Cosme Damien Vanegas (1780–), was the son of Los Angeles Pobladores Jose Maria Vanegas (1753–) and Maria Bonifacia Maxima Aguilar(–1801). Jose Maria Vanegas was alcalde (mayor) of Los Angeles from about 1786 to 1788 and again in 1796. Jose Crisógono Dolores Ayala (1793–1866) married Bárbara Bernidina Vanegas (1800–).

With the cession of California to the United States following the Mexican–American War, the 1848 Treaty of Guadalupe Hidalgo provided that the land grants would be honored. As required by the Land Act of 1851, a claim for Rancho Santa Ana was filed with the Public Land Commission in 1852, and the grant was patented to Crisogono Ayala and Cosme Vanegas in 1870.

José de Arnaz (1820–1895), grantee of Rancho Ex-Mission San Buenaventura, bought a one sixth share of Rancho Santa Ana in 1854. In 1874, Arnaz sold the land to sea captain Richard Robinson, Judge Eugene Fawcett, Jr., and H.C. Dean, who subdivided the land and started the development of the Ventura River Valley.

== Historic sites of the Rancho ==
- Santa Ana Rancho Adobe. Adobe house, two-story, built in the late 1850s by José de Arnaz. (Note: 9 miles north of the City of Ventura, just east of Highway 33 on Old Creek Road)
