= Lake Lagunita =

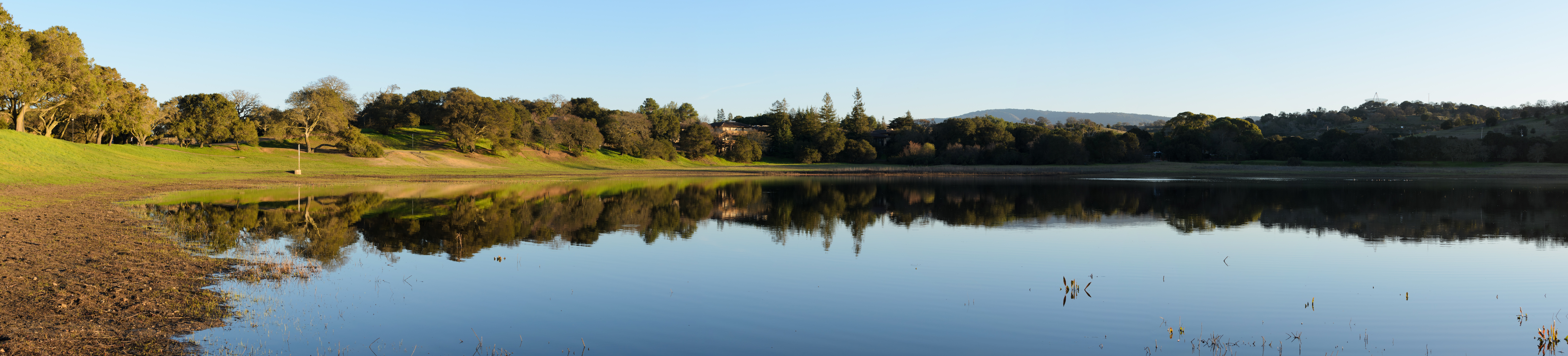
- Lake Lagunita in the winter

- Location within California
- Location: Stanford, California
- Coordinates: 37.4232°N 122.1760°W
- Type: Dry lake
- Basin countries: United States
- Surface elevation: 131 ft (40 m)

Lake Lagunita, informally referred to as Lake Lag, is an artificial dry lake in Stanford University, California, located on the western side of the Stanford campus near the Lagunita residences. It was created in c. 1870 to provide irrigation for Palo Alto Stock Farm.

== Sources ==
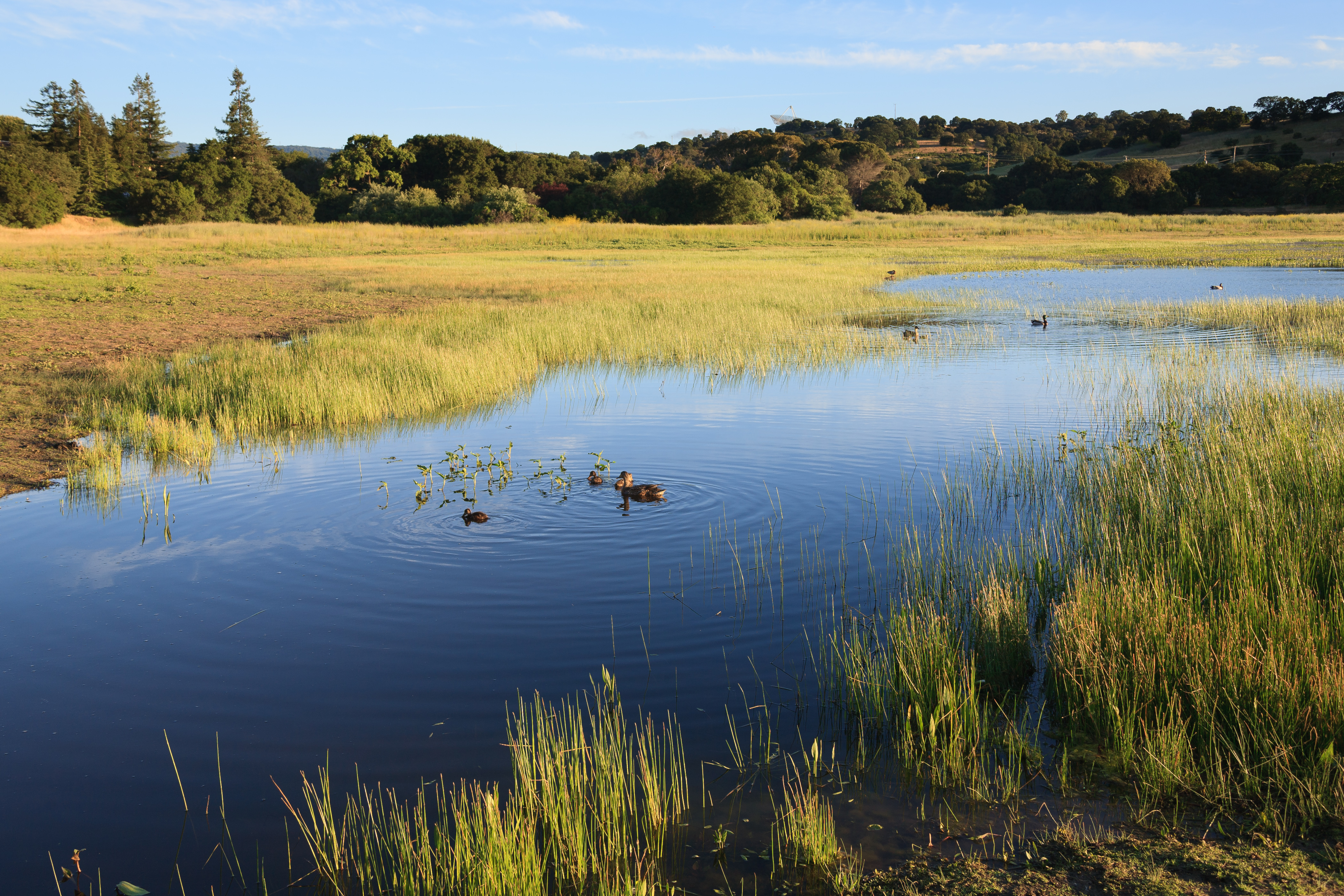
The lake serves as a basin in the winter and spring, filling to a maximum depth of approximately three feet. The majority of the remaining area is pocketed with smaller vernal pools and temporary wetlands.

During winters with normal rainfall, the lake used to be filled by diversion from San Francisquito Creek to a three-meter depth along with artificial water level maintenance, allowing recreational use by students. However, the lake has not been artificially filled since the late 1990s, due to problems either with the lake's damming walls or with conservation efforts. The diversion dam on San Francisquito Creek that had been used to fill the lake was removed in 2019.

As the lake is no longer permanently filled, it serves as a drainage basin and contains vernal pools throughout the winter and spring months. It is during this time that it serves as a vital breeding ground for endemic amphibians, rabbits, jack-rabbits, and ground squirrels. The lake was filled from the heavy rains of January 2023.

== Uses ==
The lake provides a site for recreation, and functions as a holding basin for flood control. It also offers habitat for animals.

Adjacent to the lake is a 0.9-mile (1.4 km) perimeter trail, which is open for jogging or walking.

Many dormitory residences, row houses, and several fraternities are located near the lake, including the Lagunita residences, Roble Hall, Enchanted Broccoli Forest (EBF), Narnia, Kappa Alpha Order, and Jerry.

== Wildlife ==
Amphibians:

- California tiger salamander (Ambystoma californiense): During the winter, the lake is the breeding ground for a population of California tiger salamanders, which are classified as vulnerable by the IUCN. However, the Lagunita population is believed to be at greater risk because individuals are frequently killed on or nearby Junipero Serra Boulevard during their migrations to and from the lake. As a result, a $100,000 system of migration tunnels was placed underground in 2001.
- Western toad (Bufo boreas)
- Pacific chorus frog (Pseudacris regilla)

Birds:

- Mallard (Anas platyrhynchos)
- Great blue heron (Ardea herodias)
- Great egret (Ardea alba)

== See also ==
- List of lakes in California
- List of lakes in the San Francisco Bay Area
