= Los Trancos Creek =

Los Trancos Creek Los Stancos Creek, Los Staneos Creek, Stancos Creek, Strancos Creek
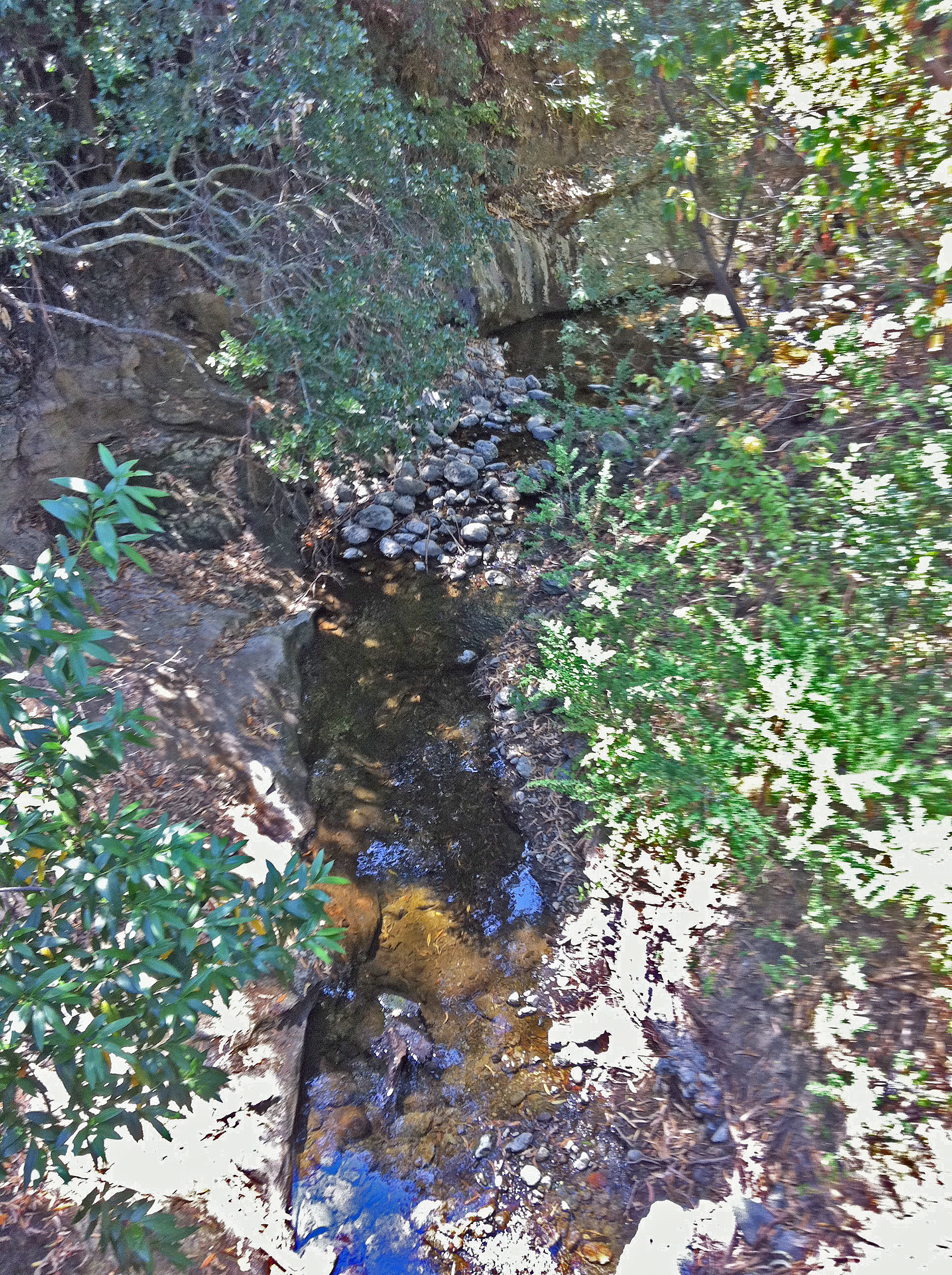
- Los Trancos Creek just upstream from Piers Lane Bridge with perennial pools at end July 2011.
- Etymology: Spanish language

Location
- Country: United States
- State: California
- Region: Northwestern Santa Clara County and southeastern San Mateo County
- City: Portola Valley, Menlo Park, Stanford University

Physical characteristics
- Source
  - location: Los Trancos Open Space Preserve on the northwest slope of Monte Bello Ridge
  - coordinates: 37°19′41″N 122°10′35″W
  - elevation: 2,080 ft (630 m)
- Mouth: San Francisquito Creek
  - location: West edge of Stanford University below Interstate 280
  - coordinates: 37°24′50″N 122°11′30″W
  - elevation: 164 ft (50 m)

Basin features
- Tributaries
  - left: Bovet Creek
  - right: Buckeye Creek (East Fork Los Trancos Creek), Felt Creek

Los Trancos Creek (meaning "barriers" or "cattle guards" from the Spanish "Las Trancas") is a creek that flows northerly from Monte Bello Ridge on the northeast slope of the Santa Cruz Mountains to its confluence with San Francisquito Creek at Stanford University in California, United States. The creek forms the boundary between northwestern Santa Clara County and southeastern San Mateo County.

== History ==
High winter flows in Los Trancos Creek are diverted by Stanford's Lagunitas Diversion Dam just downstream from Rossotti's to Felt Lake. The lake is actually a reservoir that lies west of Interstate 280 and bounded by Alpine Road and the Pearson Arastradero Preserve on Arastradero Road. Felt Lake was constructed in 1876 by gold miner and lumber dealer Job Johnston Felt, who bought 700 acres in northern Santa Clara County to farm. It was his dream to build two water companies, San Francisquito and Los Trancos. Felt built the original diversion from Los Trancos Creek to Felt Lake. By the mid-1880s, and facing opposition to his plans, the elderly Felt abandoned the water company idea and sold the farm to Timothy Paige, who quickly sold it to Leland Stanford Sr. in 1887. The university later added a larger dam to hold irrigation water for the growing campus.?

== Watershed ==
Los Trancos Creek drains an area of about 7 square miles (18 km^{2}) and consists of about 6.6 miles (10.6 km) of channel. Its headwaters are protected by the Los Trancos Open Space Preserve just northwest of Page Mill Road.

Los Trancos Creek has several minor tributaries. Named tributaries are Bovet Creek, Buckeye Creek, and Felt Creek. Bovet Creek begins in Coal Mine Ridge Open Space Preserve of Portola Valley Ranch, and is named after the local prominent ranch owner, Antoine Francis Bovet, who died in 1973. Bovet Creek flows down along Valley Oaks Street in Buckeye Creek is a small tributary that enters from the east with origins in Palo Alto Foohills Park, including Boronda Reservoir. Felt Creek is another small ephemeral tributary which begins in the Pearson-Arastradero Preserve, then passes north under Arastradero Road where it was dammed to create Felt Lake. The Felt Lake Diversion ditch begins at the intersection of Arastradero and Alpine Roads and diverts high winter Los Trancos Creek flows to join Felt Creek before the latter enters Felt Lake. Below the reservoir, Felt Creek rejoins Los Trancos Creek just north of Interstate 280. Of interest, Felt Creek may have historically joined Los Trancos Creek just north of Arastradero Road on the 1876 Thompson & West map of Santa Clara County.

The next watershed to the west is Corte Madera Creek, another tributary of San Francisquito Creek. The confluence of Los Trancos Creek with San Francisquito Creek occurs just below Piers Lane Road (between Interstate 280 and the Stanford Golf Course) in a small residential island of land belonging to Menlo Park within Stanford's lands.

== Ecology ==
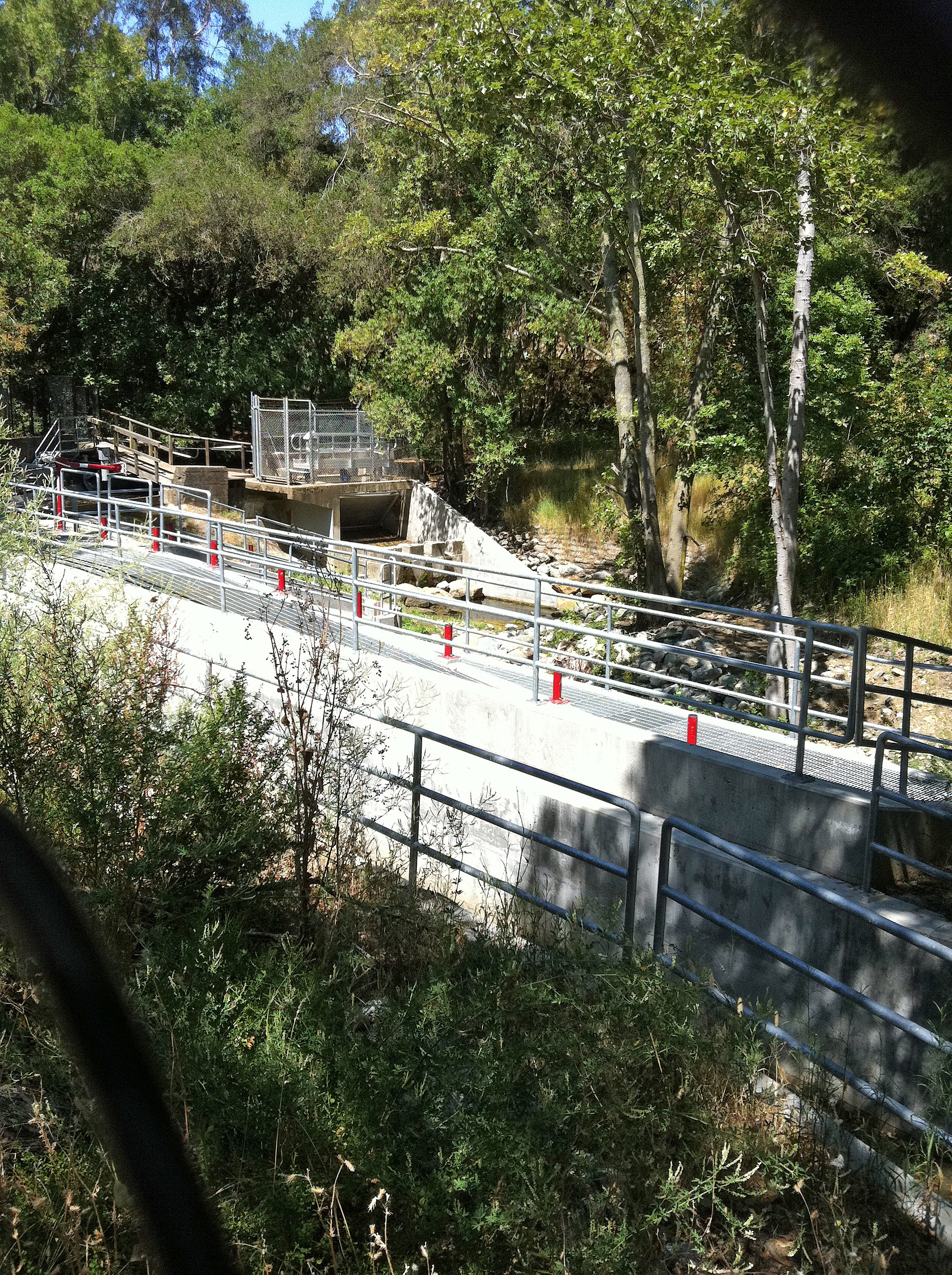
A Fish ladder on Los Trancos Creek constructed by Stanford University in 2009 enables steelhead trout to pass the Felt Lake Diversion Dam.

In 1929 Stanford installed a diversion dam on Los Trancos Creek to its Felt Lake water storage reservoir. The dam, located just below the intersection of Arastradero and Alpine Roads, blocked access of anadromous steelhead trout (Oncorhynchus mykiss) to over 3 miles (4.8 km) of pristine upstream spawning grounds. In 2009, Stanford University completed construction of a new fish screen and ladder as the previous fish ladder was an "Alaska Steep Pass" designed for much higher flows. The upper watershed is wholly protected within the Los Trancos Open Space Preserve just northwest of Page Mill Road and east of Skyline Boulevard. Spawning steelhead in Los Trancos Creek below the Felt Lake diversion dam vary from zero in drought years to several hundreds in wetter years and occurs from February to April. Steelhead spend two years in freshwater before heading to the Bay and field studies in the Stanford portion of Los Trancos Creek have found hundreds of young trout ranging from ~140 per mile to nearly 600 per mile.

From 2016 through 2020, a pair of bald eagles (Haliaeetus leucocephalus) has nested in a large eucalyptus tree near Felt Lake and the Pearson-Arastradero Preserve.

== Hiking ==
Excellent hiking from the Piers Lane parking area on Alpine Road crosses over San Franciscquito Creek and Los Trancos Creek just above their confluence and proceeds to the Stanford Dish. It is open from sunrise to sunset and no bicycles or dogs are allowed.

The Coal Mine Ridge of Portola Valley Ranch has many walking (closed to biking) trails.

The headwaters of Los Trancos Creek are easily accessed from Page Mill Road in the Los Trancos Open Space Preserve of the Midpeninsula Regional Open Space District and include the Lost Creek Trail, the San Andreas Fault Trail, the Page Mill Trail and Los Trancos Trail.
