= Edward Vischer =

German-born painter and photographer

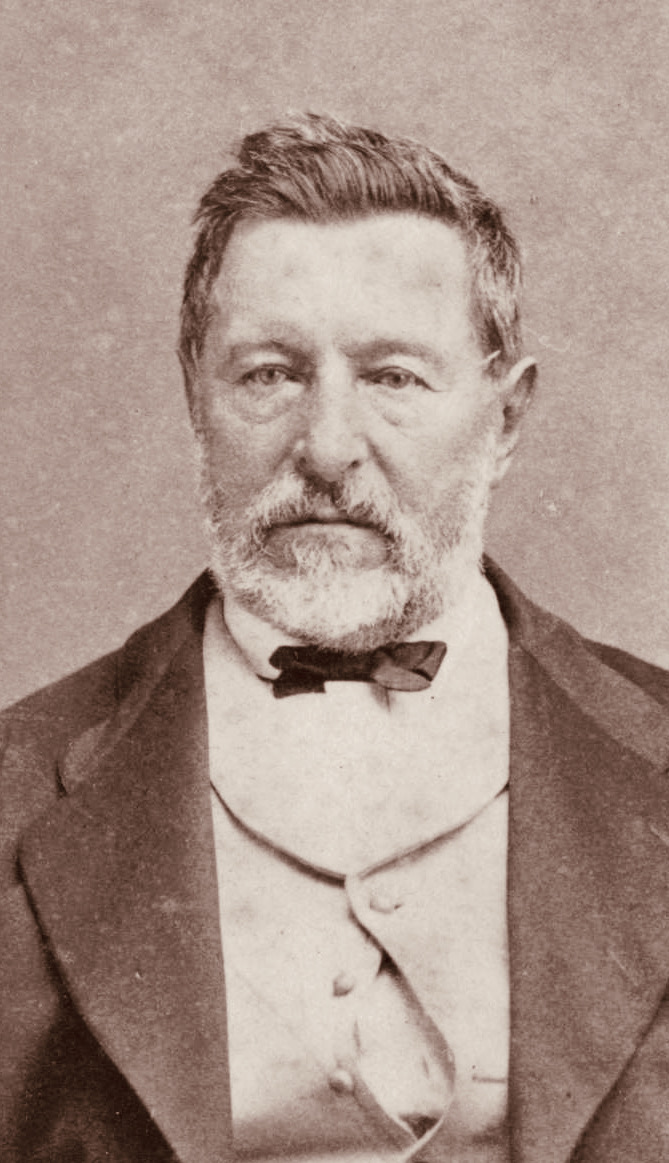
- Studio portrait of Edward Vischer. Taken at C.E. Watkins' Art Gallery, San Francisco, California.
- Born: 1809; Germany
- Died: December 24, 1878; San Francisco, California, US
- Occupation: photographer

Edward Vischer (1809–1878) was a German-born painter and photographer who migrated from Germany to Mexico at the age of nineteen. He is best known for his pencil sketches of California landscapes throughout the 1860s and 1870s.

== Career ==
In Mexico, he worked with the commercial house of Heinrich Virmond, traveling throughout the Pacific Coast region of the Americas. In 1835, he visited Peru on business, where he lived with artist Mauritius Rugendas and met Charles Darwin. In 1842, he became interested in California and agreed to travel there for Virmond.

Vischer is best known for his pencil sketches of California landscapes throughout the 1860s and 1870s. He sketched a wide variety of scenes and objects, but most commonly the California missions, trees, mountains, and rural scenes. His 1870 publication Pictorial of California gathered together nearly 200 drawings, forming the first comprehensive documentation of California scenery. He followed this in 1872 with an album of drawings of California missions; another volume of mission drawings was published in 1878, the year of his death.

== Death ==
Edward Vischer died on December 24, 1878, in San Francisco, California.

== Published works ==
A partial list of Vischer's works include:

- Sketches of the Washoe Mining Region (1862).
- Views of California: The Mammoth Tree Grove, Calaveras County, California, and Its Avenues (1862).
- Pictorial of California (1870)
- The Mission Era: California Under Spain and Mexico (1872)
- Drawings of the California Missions (1878)

== Gallery ==
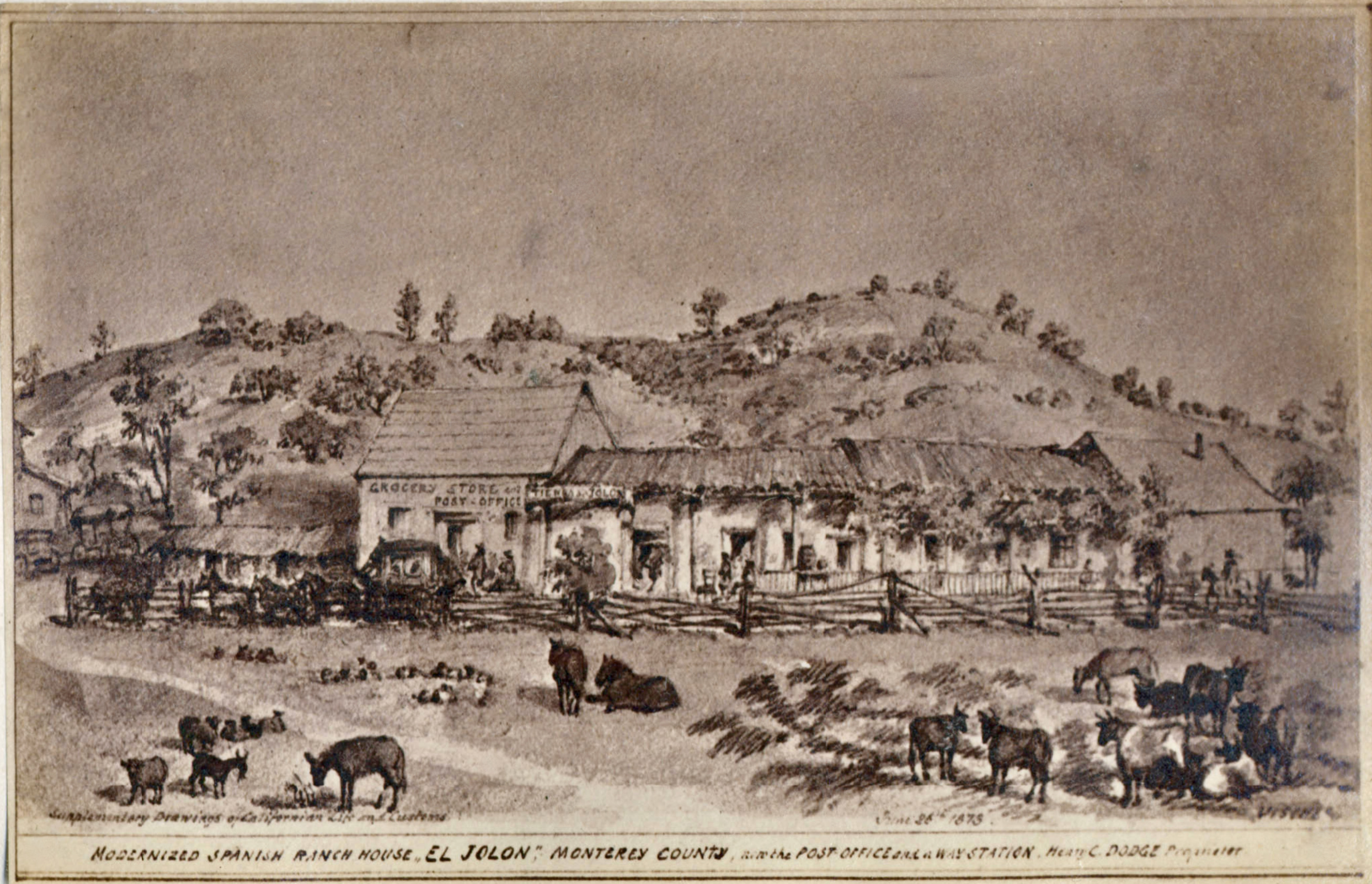
El Jolon, Monterey County

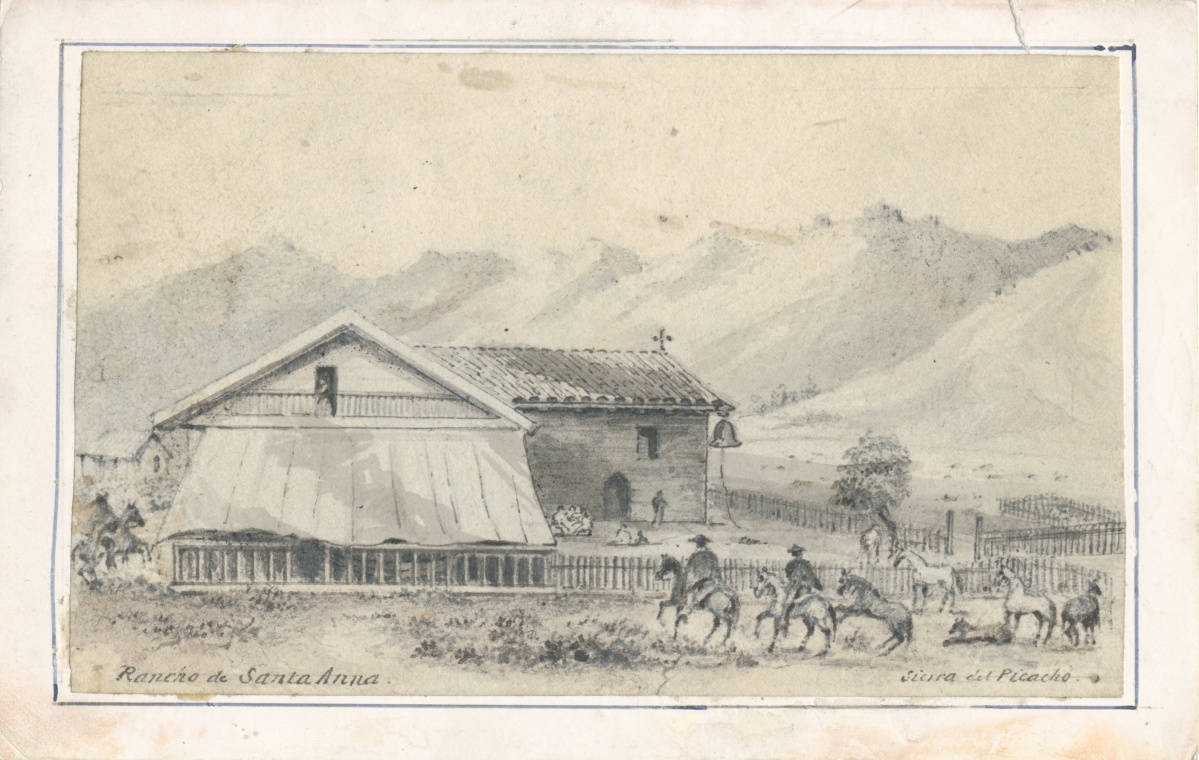
Rancho de Santa Ana by Edward Vischer

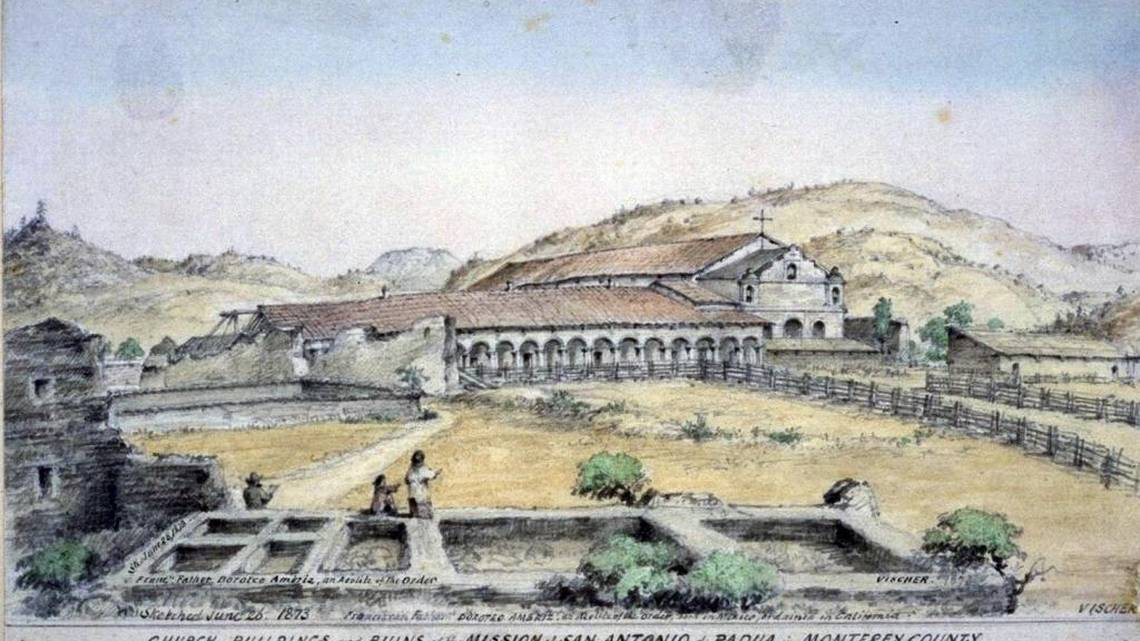
Mission San Antonio de Padua as drawn
