= George James Peirce =

American educator

George J. Peirce
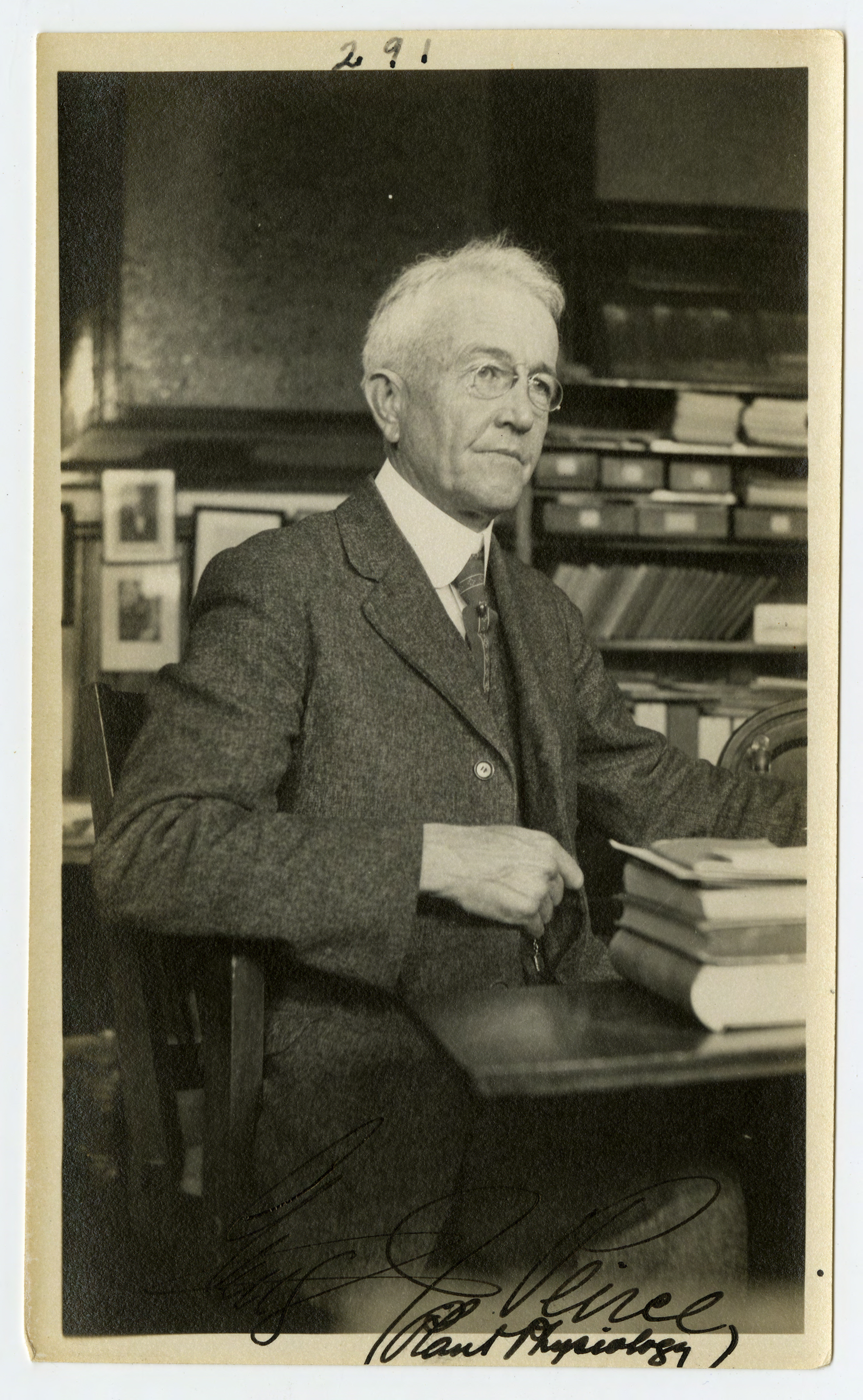
- George James Peirce, Embryo Project Encyclopedia
- Born: George James Peirce; March 13, 1868; Manila, Philippines
- Died: October 15, 1954 (aged 86); Palo Alto, California, US
- Occupation: Botanist
- Spouse: Anna H. Hobart
- Children: 3

George James Peirce (March 13, 1868 – October 15, 1954) was an American botanist known for his work on plant physiology. He was an active member of the Palo Alto, California community for over 50 years.

== Early life ==
Peirce was born on March 13, 1868, in Manila, Philippines, to American parents George Henry and Lydia Ellen Peirce (née Eaton).

== Career ==
After attending Harvard University he earned a PhD at Leipzig University. He served as assistant professor of botany at Indiana University from 1895 to 1897, then joined the faculty of Stanford University, where he spent the remainder of his career in teaching and administrative roles. He retired from Stanford in 1933, but continued his interest in his community and with Stanford.

He published three textbooks on plant physiology, was a fellow the American Academy of Arts and Sciences, and served as president of the Botanical Society of America in 1932.

Dr. Gilbert Morgan Smith, professor of botany at Stanford, said that "Dr. Peirce was an unusual teacher, he often held his classes out under the trees and was held in great affection by all his students."

Peirce built a home in Carmel-by-the-Sea, California ca. 1910 on Camino Real and 7th Avenue. David Starr Jordan, the first president of Stanford University, built his home on the same street in 1905.

== Death ==
Peirce died on October 15, 1954, of a heart attack at his home, 281 Embarcadero Road, Palo Alto, California, at the age of 86.
