= San Francisquito Creek =

San Francisquito Creek Arroyo de San Francisquito
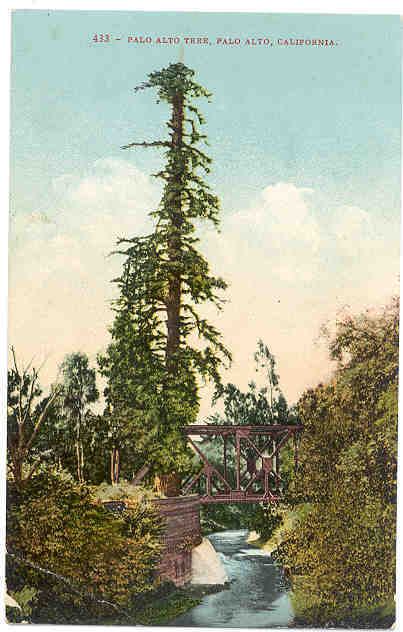
- El Palo Alto and the San Francisquito Creek c. 1910

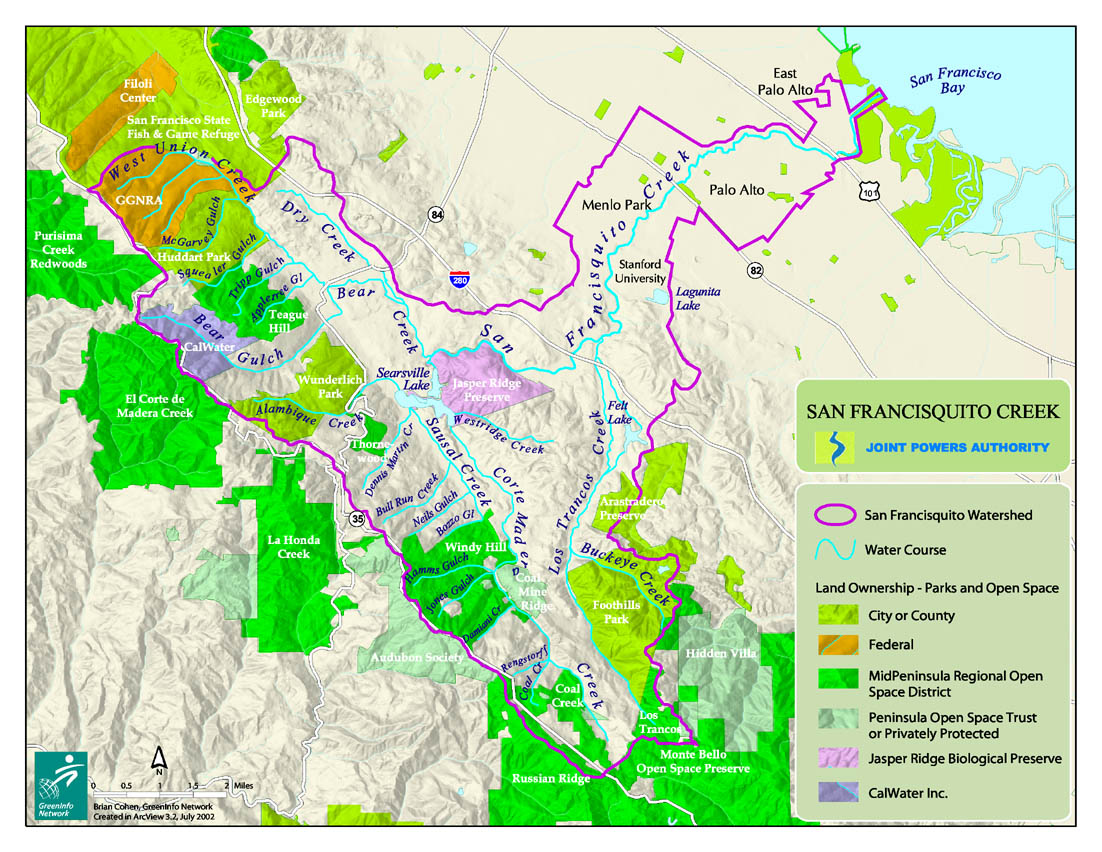
- San Francisquito Creek watershed with named tributaries

- Location of the mouth of San Francisquito Creek in California
- Etymology: Spanish language

Location
- Country: United States
- State: California
- Region: Northwestern Santa Clara County and southeastern San Mateo County
- City: Palo Alto, California

Physical characteristics
- Source: Confluence of Bear Creek and Corte Madera Creek just below Searsville Lake (actually a reservoir)
  - location: Jasper Ridge Biological Preserve
  - coordinates: 37°24′26″N 122°14′15″W
  - elevation: 351 ft (107 m)
- Mouth: Southwest San Francisco Bay
  - location: East Palo Alto, California
  - coordinates: 37°27′58″N 122°06′55″W
  - elevation: 0 ft (0 m)

Basin features
- Tributaries
  - left: Bear Creek
  - right: Corte Madera Creek, Los Trancos Creek

San Francisquito Creek (Spanish for "Little San Francisco"—the "little" referring to size of the settlement compared to Mission San Francisco de Asís) is a creek whose mainstem flows 12.9-mile-long (20.8 km) eastwards to southwest San Francisco Bay in California, United States. Historically it was called the Arroyo de San Francisco by Juan Bautista de Anza in 1776. San Francisquito Creek courses through the towns of Portola Valley and Woodside, as well as the cities of Menlo Park, Palo Alto, and East Palo Alto. The creek and its Los Trancos Creek tributary define the boundary between San Mateo and Santa Clara counties.

== History ==
The original inhabitants of the area were the Ohlone people, called by the Spaniards "Costanoans", or Coast-dwellers (from Spanish costeño meaning 'coast dweller'). These local residents lived off the land, gathering nuts, berries and fish from both the ocean and the bay. Because of the abundance of food there was no need for them to practice agriculture. Evidences of their civilization are still being unearthed on the Filoli estate in Woodside, and along San Francisquito Creek.

In 1769, the Spanish exploration party led by Don Gaspar de Portolà camped by the creek for five nights, November 6–11, after their momentous discovery of San Francisco Bay. The Franciscan missionary Juan Crespí, a member of the expedition, noted in his diary that, "The commander decided that we should stop in this valley while the explorers went out again to acquire certain information...They were given four days to be gone". When the scouts returned, the expedition leaders met and decided to turn around and return to Monterey Bay (the original goal), which they had passed but failed to recognize as the place described by earlier maritime explorers.

In 1774 Father Francisco Palou, on Captain Rivera's expedition, erected a cross near the giant creekside redwood they called "El Palo Alto", to mark the site of a proposed mission (later changed to Mission Santa Clara). The colonizing of the Peninsula began after the 1776 expedition of Juan Bautista De Anza left Monterey on the first overland expedition to San Francisco Bay, and passed across the creek on its way to establishing Mission Dolores and the Presidio of San Francisco in 1776. Although de Anza discovered Padre Palou's 1774 wooden cross, the creek's summer flow was deemed too low to support a mission.

== Watershed ==
The headwaters of the San Francisquito watershed are in the Santa Cruz Mountains above Menlo Park, around 667 meters (2,188 ft) above the Bay. The upper watershed consists of at least 22 named creeks. Including the upper reaches, the total watershed drains an area of 45 square miles (120 km^{2}).

The creek mainstem originates at the confluence of Bear Creek and Corte Madera Creek just below Searsville Lake in the Jasper Ridge Biological Preserve on lands purchased by Stanford University in 1892. The lake is formed by Searsville Dam, which was built in 1892, one year after the founding of the university itself. The 65-foot-tall (20 m) and 275-foot-wide (84 m) Searsville Dam consists of a series of interlocking concrete boulders that resemble a massively steep staircase. After leasing the lake for recreational use for 50 years, the Stanford Board of Trustees closed public access to Searsville Lake in 1977. The reservoir has lost over 90% of its original water storage capacity as roughly 1.5×10^{6} cubic yards (1.1×10^{6} m^{3}) of sediment has filled it in. Searsville Dam does not provide potable water, flood control, or hydropower. Although removal of the dam would double available spawning habitat on this important steelhead trout stream, Stanford's Jasper Ridge Advisory Committee in 2007 recommended that the dam not be removed and the lake dredged to maintain open water. Stanford University uses water from the lake to irrigate its golf course and other athletic facilities on its campus. Anti-dam proponents point to a growing trend in habitat restoration nationally with over 500 dams removed in recent years.

The first major tributary to San Francisquito Creek is Los Trancos Creek, which joins from the left (heading downstream) just north of I-280.

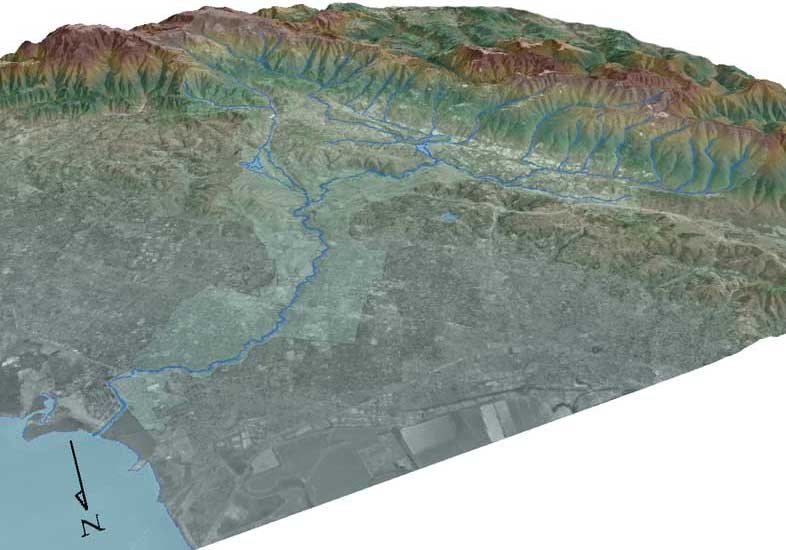
3-D Map of San Francisquito Creek Watershed

The creek runs for a length described by different authorities as from 13 to 22 kilometers (8.1 to 13.7 mi), but the mainstem as measured utilizing The National Map from the confluence of Bear Creek and Corte Madera Creek runs 12.9 miles (20.8 km) to San Francisco Bay. After exiting the foothills near Junipero Serra Boulevard and Alpine Road, runs in an incised channel in a broad alluvial fan, before draining into the Bay south of the Dumbarton Bridge and north of the Palo Alto Flood Basin. Its watershed is about 110 square kilometers (42 sq mi) in extent, including areas of San Mateo and Santa Clara counties. In one stretch it forms the boundary between the city of Palo Alto and the cities of East Palo Alto and Menlo Park, and thus between San Mateo and Santa Clara counties, reflecting the fact that it was originally used as the boundary between the lands of the Spanish Missions at San Francisco and Santa Clara. The tree from which Palo Alto takes its name, El Palo Alto, stands on the banks of the creek.

In 1857, the United States Coast Survey (USCS) identified 1,142 acres (462 ha) of tidal marsh at the mouth of the creek. There were also two large [63-and-118-acre (25 and 48 ha)] willow groves adjacent to the tidal marsh associated with high groundwater tables and seasonal flooding. In the late 1920s levees were constructed to re-route the creek through a new engineered channel from its former mouth, to a sharp north turn for about half a mile, then to the northeast, before exiting to the Bay. By 2004, filled areas such as the Palo Alto golf course and the Palo Alto Airport have reduced the tidal marsh to 352 acres (1.42 km^{2}).

== Ecology ==
=== Salmonids ===
San Francisquito Creek hosts the most viable remaining anadromous steelhead (Oncorhynchus mykiss irideus) population in southern San Francisco Bay streams. Because the San Francisquito Creek mainstem (and its Los Trancos Creek tributary) forms the boundary of Santa Clara County and San Mateo County, the respective county water districts were unable to agree historically on paying to channelize and concretize the creek, leaving it in a highly natural state. There is a steelhead trout specimen in the California Academy of Sciences that was collected by Edward Z. Hughes in the 1890s. The first President of Stanford University, David Starr Jordan, included a rendering of a "sea-run rainbow trout from San Francisquito Creek" in the Pacific Monthly in 1906. Bear Creek and Los Trancos Creek and their respective tributaries support an observable spawning steelhead population that is threatened by the effects of urbanization. Above the watershed's several dams native resident rainbow trout, a form of landlocked steelhead trout, persist as well. These rainbow trout possess the historical (pre-dam) anadromous steelhead trout genetics and were never introgressed by hatchery-origin fish. However, above dam trout generally suffer from inbreeding depression.

Several lines of evidence support the historical presence of coho salmon (Oncorhynchus kisutch) in San Francisquito Creek. Archaeological remains of unspecified salmonids ("possibly coho") were reported by Gobalet in the creek. Leidy concluded that coho salmon were likely present and cited that the most suitable habitat for coho salmon was in perennial, well shaded reaches of mainstem San Francisquito Creek, and several small, perennial tributaries including Los Trancos, Corte Madera, Bear, and West Union creeks. In addition, three independent oral history sources indicate that coho salmon were abundant in the creek through the first half of the twentieth century. According to local historian Dorothy Regnery's notes from her 1966 interview with Edgar H. Batchelder, who was 2 years old when his father became caretaker of Searsville Dam in 1897, "When the dam was 'wasting', or overflowing in the winter, salmon would swim upstream as far as the base of the dam. Using a pitchfork Mr. Batchelder would spear them to supplement the family's menu." His "favorite place to fish for trout was in the Dennis Martin Creek". A second source described catching "steelhead" and silver (coho) salmon in San Francisquito Creek and the Guadalupe River watershed in the 1930s and 1940s. He said that the Guadalupe River also had runs of chinook salmon (Oncorhynchus tshawytscha) that were very large in wet years." Thirdly, Dennis L. Bark, a senior fellow at the Hoover Institution, recalls playing on San Francisquito Creek around 1947: "Salmon swam up it, and in winter it was a dangerous place." The historical range of coho salmon overlapped geographically with San Francisquito Creek. Coho salmon were historically present in other San Francisco Bay streams south of San Francisco, as evidence by museum specimens from San Mateo Creek and photographic evidence of coho runs in Alameda Creek. The southern limit of coho salmon in coastal California streams was recently confirmed to extend through Santa Cruz County based on both archaeological evidence and historically collected specimens. Recent physical evidence utilizing ancient DNA sequencing of salmonid remains proved that the southern limit of coastal Chinook salmon included the southernmost tributaries of South San Francisco Bay.

==== Dams impeding salmonid runs ====
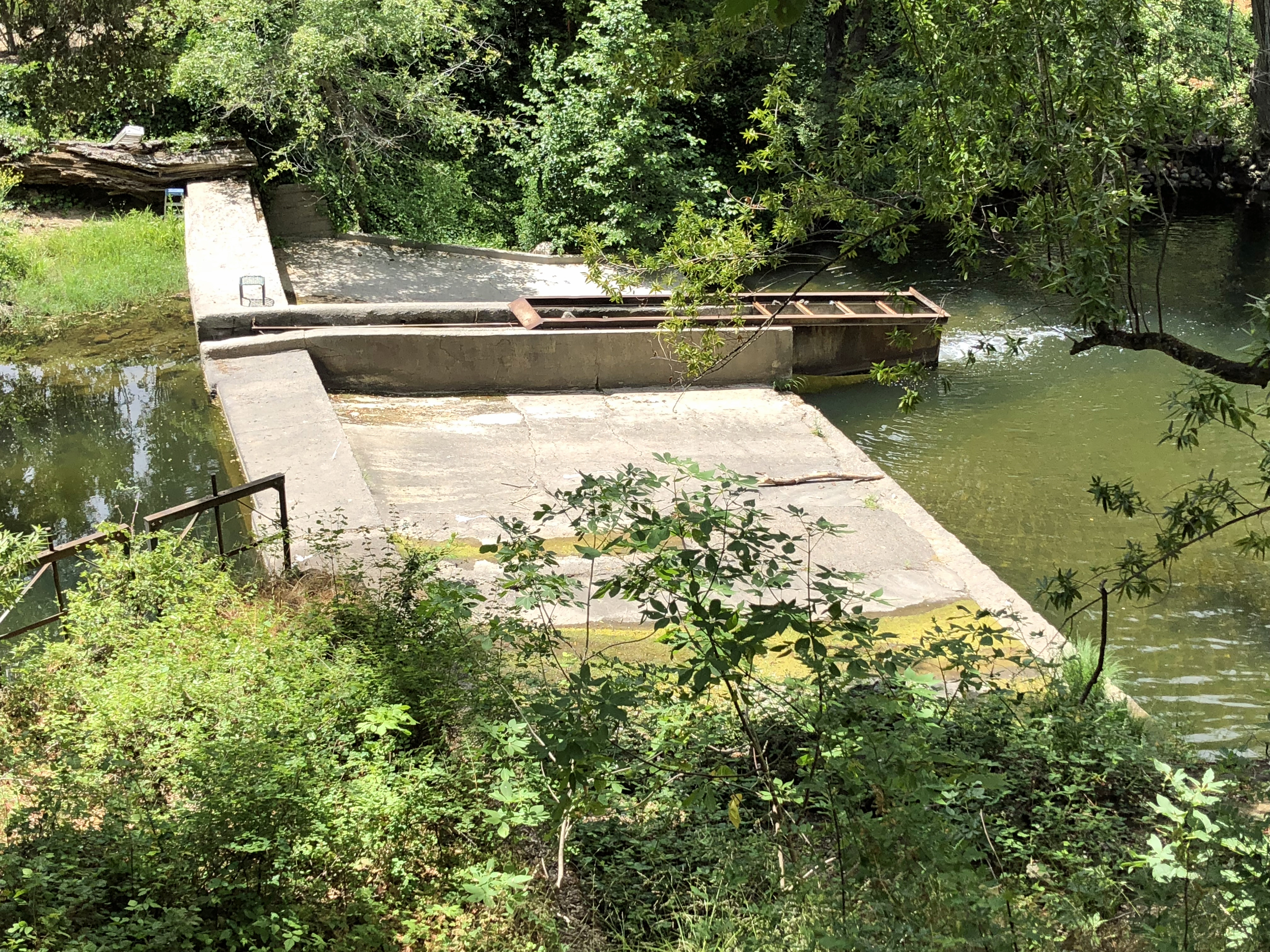
Stanford removed the Lagunita Diversion Dam and Fish Ladder on San Francisquito Creek, near Happy Hollow Lane in Menlo Park, in late 2018, improving access for salmonid spawning runs up Los Trancos Creek and also up Corte Madera Creek to Searsville Dam

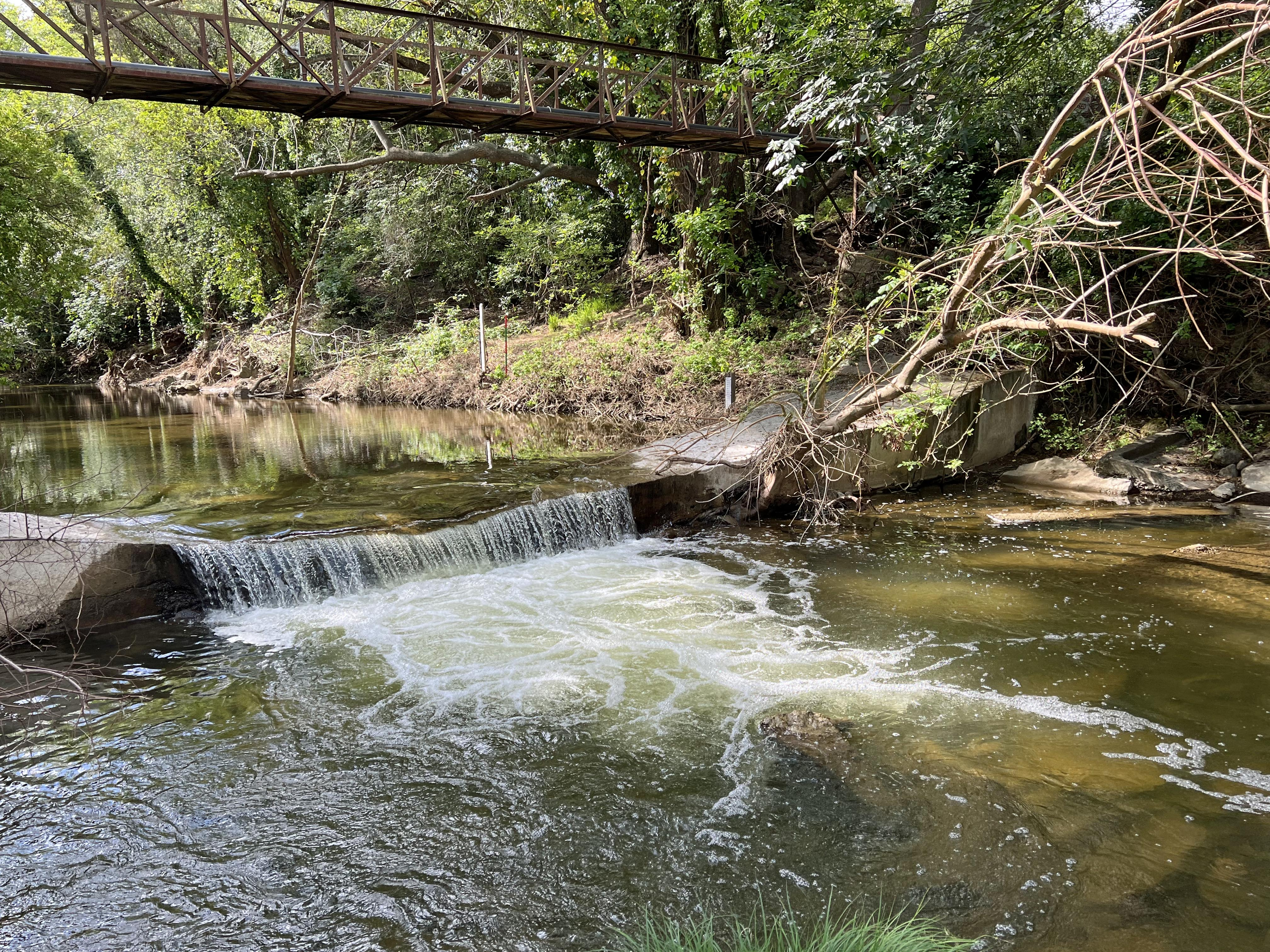
USGS Stream Gage Weir may be a partial barrier to trout and salmon spawning runs up the San Francisquito Creek mainstem

Historically, several dams operated by Stanford presented impassable to nearly impassable barriers to trout, and possibly, salmon spawning runs in the San Francisquito Creek watershed. Several of these dams were constructed to divert stream flows to Stanford's reservoirs, the Lagunita Diversion Dam diverted flows to Lake Lagunita, Searsville Reservoir Dam which diverts minor flows for the Stanford Golf Course, and the Los Trancos Creek Diversion Dam which diverts water to Felt Reservoir. A genetics study of San Francisquito Creek steelhead in 1996 found that the fish are native and not of hatchery stock. In 2006, an Aquatic Habitat Assessment and Limiting Factors Analysis commissioned by the Santa Clara Valley Water District concluded that the key factor limiting smolt production within the study area (San Francisquito Creek mainstem and Los Trancos Creek) and potentially throughout the watershed, is a lack of suitable winter refuge in deep pools and large woody debris. Secondly, outgoing salmonid migration is inhibited by seasonal drying and passage impediments. The Jasper Ridge Road Crossing also presented a significant barrier to fish passage. Stanford has removed two of these barriers, the Lagunitas Diversion Dam was removed in 2018 and the Jasper Ridge Road Crossing, which is now a bridge instead of a weir.

Stanford installed Los Trancos Creek Diversion Dam in 1929, to divert stream flows to its Felt Lake water storage reservoir. The dam, located just below the intersection of Arastradero and Alpine Roads, blocks access of upmigrating steelhead trout to over 3 miles (4.8 km) of pristine upstream spawning grounds. In 2009, Stanford University completed construction of a new fish screen and ladder as the previous fish ladder was an "Alaska Steep Pass" designed for much higher flows. Anadromous steelhead trout now access the upper Los Trancos Creek watershed above Rossotti's Alpine Inn Beer Garden.

The Lagunita Diversion dam was the most significant barrier to fish passage, because it was located on the mainstem San Francisquito Creek, blocking upstream salmonid migration to all San Francisquito Creek tributaries in lower rainfall years. It was located just north of the east end of Happy Hollow Lane near Alpine Road and near the Stanford Weekend Acres neighborhood in unincorporated Menlo Park. This dam was originally constructed in 1899–1900 to divert winter flows to fill Stanford's Lake Lagunita. It is located 1/3 mile (0.54 km) downstream of the mouth of Los Trancos Creek but stopped diverting water to fill the artificial lake when the San Francisquito Creek Pump Station (2/3 mile (1.1 km) further downstream) took over this task in 1998. A fish ladder was constructed on the Lake Lagunita Diversion Dam in 1954, however despite re-modification it remained impassable in low rainfall years. In 2014 Our Children's Earth Foundation sued Stanford for allegedly violating the Endangered Species Act, saying the dams obstruct steelhead trout from swimming upstream to freshwater habitats necessary in the early stages of their life cycle. They also registered concern about the Jasper Ridge Road Crossing as another barrier to fish passage. The Jasper Ridge Road Crossing was a concrete weir (low dam) built along a dirt road that crosses San Francisquito Creek shortly downstream from the confluence of Corte Madera and Bear Creeks. The Jasper Ridge Road Crossing blocked the passage of steelhead upstream and downstream during lower flow conditions that begin in the spring and prevent smolt outmigration in late spring, as well as immigration of spawning adults in dry winters. In 2015 Stanford denied that the court had ordered them to remove the Lagunitas Diversion Dam and maintained that it had been planning to remove that dam since its 2010 Habitat Conservation Plan and had initiated the engineering and hydrology work to prepare for removal. In December 2017 Stanford received a $1.2 million ecosystem and watershed restoration grant from the California Department of Fish and Wildlife which covered 30% of the costs of dam removal and riparian restoration. By late 2018 Stanford removed the 119-year-old Lagunita Diversion Dam and restored 480 feet (150 m) of the creek, improving fish passage with pools, shallows and native plants, and moved the creek eastwards away from the residential area. In addition, Stanford replaced the Jasper Ridge Road Crossing weir with a bridge, opening 6.6 miles (10.6 km) of unimpeded access to the Bear Creek mainstem, and its tributaries such as West Union Creek, to salmonid spawning runs.

The one remaining complete barrier to salmonid spawning runs on Stanford lands is Searsville Dam. Searsville Dam is located upstream of the San Francisquito Creek mainstem (which is formed by the confluence of Bear Creek and Corte Madera Creek) and blocks its largest tributary, Corte Madera Creek. Elimination of Searsville dam could restore 20 miles (32 km) of anadromous steelhead habitat in the Corte Madera Creek mainstem and its multiple tributaries. In 2014 a systematic study of 1,400 plus dams in California identified Searsville Dam as a high-priority candidate to improve environmental flows for native fish conservation. In 2015, Stanford University announced plans to eliminate the Searsville Dam as a fish passage barrier by either boring a hole through the base of the dam or allowing the Searsville Reservoir to continue filling with silt and re-route Corte Madera Creek around the dam. Partial barriers to salmonid spawning runs on the San Francisquito Creek mainstem include the USGS stream gage weir and the Stanford's San Francisquito Creek Pump Station two weirs, all located between Junipero Boulevard and Stowe Lane along Alpine Road.

=== Other fauna and flora ===
Other threatened species include two riparian fauna: the threatened California red-legged frog (Rana draytonii) and the western pond turtle (Actinemys marmorata).

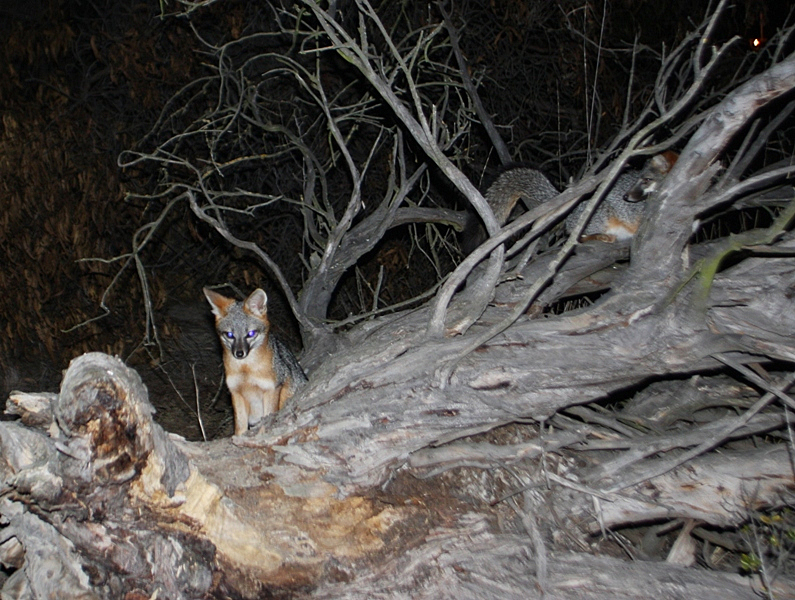
Pair of gray foxes (Urocyon cinereoargenteus), the only tree-climbing canid in the Americas, den and forage for rodents, grasshoppers and berries near the mouth of Matadero Creek in the Palo Alto Baylands

Recently, gray foxes (Urocyon cinereoargenteus) have been documented near the mouth of San Francisquito Creek (see photo) and on the Palo Alto Golf Course. Populations of gray fox have increased in the South Bay since the U.S. Fish and Wildlife Service has culled non-native red foxes (Vulpes vulpes) because the latter prey on the endangered California clapper rail (Rallus longirostris obsoletus). Genetically, gray fox are the most basal of all canids.

The flora of the upper watershed consists of scattered oak and madrone woodlands that are intermingled with grassland habitat, in some areas forming a savanna. A grove of upland coast redwood (Sequoia sempervirens) forest occurs along San Francisquito Creek just below Searsville Lake. Native tree species that occur in the riparian corridor include valley oak, coast live oak, willows and California buckeyes. Common native riparian shrubs include coffeeberry (Rhamnus californicus), ocean spray (Holodiscus discolor), and creeping snowberry (Symphoricarpos mollis). Within the Jasper Ridge Biological Preserve there are isolated second-generation stands of coast redwood. Other common woody species along the creek banks include the yellow-flowering box elder, big-leaved maple, willows of several species, white alder, California bay and California hazelnut.

== Conservation ==
In normal winters the creek runs sluggishly in a deep arroyo; in summer it is usually dry. However, it is capable of flooding, and the risk has become more severe as increased urbanisation along its course has increased the area of impermeable surfaces. In the 1998 El Niño storms, the creek burst its banks. The creek's levees were also damaged.

The body responsible for the conservation and management of the Mid-Peninsula watersheds, of which the creek is one, is the Santa Clara Valley Water District. However, because of the significance of the creek in a densely populated area where environmental concerns and recent flooding are both salient in the public mind, a Joint Powers Authority (JPA) has been formed to address community concerns about the management of the creek. The JPA is currently undertaking or scoping various projects for the improvement of the creek, for example the stabilisation and revegetation of its banks. The members of the JPA are the city councils of Palo Alto, Menlo Park and East Palo Alto, the Santa Clara Valley Water District, and the San Mateo County Flood Control District.

== See also ==
- List of watercourses in the San Francisco Bay Area
