= Dish =

Dish, dishes or DISH may refer to:

== Culinary ==
- Dish (food), something prepared to be eaten
- Dishware, plates and bowls for eating from
- Dishes, items that are the subject of dishwashing

== Communications ==
- Dish antenna, a type of antenna
- Dish Network, a satellite television provider in North America
- Dish TV, a satellite television provider in India
- Satellite dish, an antenna for receiving satellite signals
- Stanford Dish, a U.S. Government-owned radio-telescope at Stanford University

== Arts, entertainment, and media ==
- DISH (band), a Japanese band
- Dish (American band), an American alternative rock band
- "Dish", a 2016 single by Chancellor
- "The Dishes", a 1980 episode of the TV series King Rollo

== Other uses ==
- Dish, Texas, a town in Denton County, Texas, United States
- Diffuse idiopathic skeletal hyperostosis, a form of arthritis
- Bicycle wheel § Dish
- Petri dish, lab equipment mainly used in microbiology

== See also ==
- Let's Dish!, a meal preparation company in Minnesota
- Disch, surname
- Dyche, surname
- Diš (cuneiform), a sign in cuneiform writing
- Dishdish, a village in Iran
- Dishy (disambiguation)
- The Dish (disambiguation)
