= Kalateh-ye Qanbar =

Village in Razavi Khorasan province, Iran

Kalateh-ye Qanbar Persian: كلاته قنبر
- Village
- Location within Iran
- Coordinates: 35°59′16″N 59°01′18″E
- Country: Iran
- Province: Razavi Khorasan
- County: Zeberkhan
- District: Eshaqabad
- Rural District: Heshmatiyeh

Population (2016)
  - Total: 242
- Time zone: UTC+3:30 (IRST)

Kalateh-ye Qanbar (Persian: كلاته قنبر) (Note: Also romanized as Kalāteh-ye Qanbar) is a village in Heshmatiyeh Rural District of Eshaqabad District in Zeberkhan County, Razavi Khorasan province, Iran.

== Demographics ==
=== Population ===
At the time of the 2006 National Census, the village's population was 176 in 42 households, when it was in Eshaqabad Rural District of the former Zeberkhan District in Nishapur County. The following census in 2011 counted 201 people in 50 households. The 2016 census measured the population of the village as 242 people in 67 households.

In 2020, the district was separated from the county in the establishment of Zeberkhan County. The rural district was transferred to the new Eshaqabad District, and Kalateh-ye Qanbar was transferred to Heshmatiyeh Rural District created in the same district.
