= Ebrahimabad, Zeberkhan =

Village in Razavi Khorasan province, Iran

Ebrahimabad Persian: ابراهيم اباد
- Village
- Location within Iran
- Coordinates: 36°04′03″N 58°58′09″E
- Country: Iran
- Province: Razavi Khorasan
- County: Zeberkhan
- District: Eshaqabad
- Rural District: Heshmatiyeh

Population (2016)
  - Total: 74
- Time zone: UTC+3:30 (IRST)

Ebrahimabad (Persian: ابراهيم اباد) (Note: Also romanized as Ebrāhīmābād; also known as Ebrāhīmābād-e Hāshemī) is a village in Heshmatiyeh Rural District of Eshaqabad District in Zeberkhan County, Razavi Khorasan province, Iran.

== Demographics ==
=== Population ===
At the time of the 2006 National Census, the village's population was 67 in 19 households, when it was in Eshaqabad Rural District of the former Zeberkhan District in Nishapur County. The following census in 2011 counted 64 people in 19 households. The 2016 census measured the population of the village as 74 people in 24 households.

In 2020, the district was separated from the county in the establishment of Zeberkhan County. The rural district was transferred to the new Eshaqabad District, and Ebrahimabad was transferred to Heshmatiyeh Rural District created in the same district.
