= Esmatabad, Razavi Khorasan =

Village in Razavi Khorasan province, Iran

Esmatabad Persian: عصمتاباد
- Village
- Location within Iran
- Coordinates: 36°00′50″N 59°04′27″E
- Country: Iran
- Province: Razavi Khorasan
- County: Zeberkhan
- District: Eshaqabad
- Rural District: Heshmatiyeh

Population (2016)
  - Total: 502
- Time zone: UTC+3:30 (IRST)

Esmatabad (Persian: عصمتاباد) (Note: Also romanized as ‘Eşmatābād) is a village in Heshmatiyeh Rural District of Eshaqabad District in Zeberkhan County, Razavi Khorasan province, Iran.

== Demographics ==
=== Population ===
At the time of the 2006 National Census, the village's population was 587 in 141 households, when it was in Eshaqabad Rural District of the former Zeberkhan District in Nishapur County. The following census in 2011 counted 595 people in 184 households. The 2016 census measured the population of the village as 502 people in 152 households.

In 2020, the district was separated from the county in the establishment of Zeberkhan County. The rural district was transferred to the new Eshaqabad District, and Esmatabad was transferred to Heshmatiyeh Rural District created in the same district.
