= Hoseynabad, Zeberkhan =

Village in Razavi Khorasan province, Iran

Hoseynabad Persian: حسين اباد
- Village
- Location within Iran
- Coordinates: 36°00′59″N 59°03′28″E
- Country: Iran
- Province: Razavi Khorasan
- County: Zeberkhan
- District: Eshaqabad
- Rural District: Heshmatiyeh

Population (2016)
  - Total: 368
- Time zone: UTC+3:30 (IRST)

Hoseynabad (Persian: حسين اباد) (Note: Also romanized as Ḩoseynābād) is a village in Heshmatiyeh Rural District of Eshaqabad District in Zeberkhan County, Razavi Khorasan province, Iran.

== Demographics ==
=== Population ===
At the time of the 2006 National Census, the village's population was 373 in 96 households, when it was in Eshaqabad Rural District of the former Zeberkhan District in Nishapur County. The following census in 2011 counted 362 people in 100 households. The 2016 census measured the population of the village as 368 people in 111 households.

In 2020, the district was separated from the county in the establishment of Zeberkhan County. The rural district was transferred to the new Eshaqabad District, and Hoseynabad was transferred to Heshmatiyeh Rural District created in the same district.
