= Ahmadabad, Zeberkhan =

Village in Razavi Khorasan province, Iran

Ahmadabad Persian: احمداباد
- Village
- Location within Iran
- Coordinates: 35°59′30″N 59°02′57″E
- Country: Iran
- Province: Razavi Khorasan
- County: Zeberkhan
- District: Eshaqabad
- Rural District: Heshmatiyeh

Population (2016)
  - Total: 327
- Time zone: UTC+3:30 (IRST)

Ahmadabad (Persian: احمداباد) (Note: Also romanized as Aḩmadābād) is a village in Heshmatiyeh Rural District of Eshaqabad District in Zeberkhan County, Razavi Khorasan province, Iran.

== Demographics ==
=== Population ===
At the time of the 2006 National Census, the village's population was 260 in 70 households, when it was in Eshaqabad Rural District of the former Zeberkhan District in Nishapur County. The following census in 2011 counted 290 people in 84 households. The 2016 census measured the population of the village as 327 people in 96 households.

In 2020, the district was separated from the county in the establishment of Zeberkhan County. The rural district was transferred to the new Eshaqabad District, and Ahmadabad was transferred to Heshmatiyeh Rural District created in the same district.
