= Heshmatiyeh, Zeberkhan =

Village in Razavi Khorasan province, Iran

Heshmatiyeh Persian: حشمتيه
- Village
- Location within Iran
- Coordinates: 36°01′39″N 59°06′01″E
- Country: Iran
- Province: Razavi Khorasan
- County: Zeberkhan
- District: Eshaqabad
- Rural District: Heshmatiyeh

Population (2016)
  - Total: 540
- Time zone: UTC+3:30 (IRST)

Heshmatiyeh (Persian: حشمتيه) (Note: Also romanized as Ḩeshmatīyeh) is a village in, and the capital of, Heshmatiyeh Rural District in Eshaqabad District of Zeberkhan County, Razavi Khorasan province, Iran.

== Demographics ==
=== Population ===
At the time of the 2006 National Census, the village's population was 589 in 162 households, when it was in Eshaqabad Rural District of the former Zeberkhan District in Nishapur County. The following census in 2011 counted 646 people in 207 households. The 2016 census measured the population of the village as 540 people in 171 households.

In 2020, the district was separated from the county in the establishment of Zeberkhan County. The rural district was transferred to the new Eshaqabad District, and Heshmatiyeh was transferred to Heshmatiyeh Rural District created in the same district.
