= Fakhrabad, Zeberkhan =

Village in Razavi Khorasan province, Iran

Fakhrabad Persian: فخراباد
- Village
- Location within Iran
- Coordinates: 36°00′15″N 59°05′14″E
- Country: Iran
- Province: Razavi Khorasan
- County: Zeberkhan
- District: Eshaqabad
- Rural District: Heshmatiyeh

Population (2016)
  - Total: 401
- Time zone: UTC+3:30 (IRST)

Fakhrabad (Persian: فخراباد) (Note: Also romanized as Fakhrābād) is a village in Heshmatiyeh Rural District of Eshaqabad District in Zeberkhan County, Razavi Khorasan province, Iran.

== Demographics ==
=== Population ===
At the time of the 2006 National Census, the village's population was 409 in 92 households, when it was in Eshaqabad Rural District of the former Zeberkhan District in Nishapur County. The following census in 2011 counted 360 people in 111 households. The 2016 census measured the population of the village as 401 people in 118 households.

In 2020, the district was separated from the county in the establishment of Zeberkhan County. The rural district was transferred to the new Eshaqabad District, and Fakhrabad was transferred to Heshmatiyeh Rural District created in the same district.
