= Dishy =

Dishy may refer to:

- Bob Dishy (born 1934) U.S. actor
- Rishi Sunak (born 1980), sometimes referred to by the nickname "Dishy Rishi", prime minister of the United Kingdom, 2022–2024
- Dishy McFlatface, the Starlink terminal dish antenna

== See also ==
- Mister Dishey, a character from the TV show Pucca; see List of Pucca characters
- Dishi (simplified Chinese: 帝师; traditional Chinese: 帝師; pinyin: Dìshī; lit. 'Teacher of the Emperor'), Imperial Preceptor
- Dyshi, 2007 song
- Dyche (surname)
- Dish (disambiguation)
- Disher
- Dished
- DiShIn
