= Nowbahar, Zeberkhan =

Village in Razavi Khorasan province, Iran

Nowbahar Persian: نوبهار
- Village
- Location within Iran
- Country: Iran
- Province: Razavi Khorasan
- County: Zeberkhan
- District: Eshaqabad
- Rural District: Heshmatiyeh

Population (2016)
  - Total: 215
- Time zone: UTC+3:30 (IRST)

Nowbahar (Persian: نوبهار) (Note: Also romanized as Nowbāhār and Nowbahār) is a village in Heshmatiyeh Rural District of Eshaqabad District in Zeberkhan County, Razavi Khorasan province, Iran.

== Demographics ==
=== Population ===
At the time of the 2006 National Census, the village's population was 59 in 13 households, when it was in Eshaqabad Rural District of the former Zeberkhan District in Nishapur County. The following census in 2011 counted 130 people in 43 households. The 2016 census measured the population of the village as 215 people in 68 households.

In 2020, the district was separated from the county in the establishment of Zeberkhan County. The rural district was transferred to the new Eshaqabad District, and Nowbahar was transferred to Heshmatiyeh Rural District created in the same district.
