= Hesar, Eshaqabad =

Village in Razavi Khorasan province, Iran

Hesar Persian: حصار
- Village
- Location within Iran
- Coordinates: 35°59′09″N 59°05′00″E
- Country: Iran
- Province: Razavi Khorasan
- County: Zeberkhan
- District: Eshaqabad
- Rural District: Heshmatiyeh

Population (2016)
  - Total: 307
- Time zone: UTC+3:30 (IRST)

Hesar (Persian: حصار) (Note: Also romanized as Ḩeşār; also known as Ḩeşār Jahānābād) is a village in Heshmatiyeh Rural District of Eshaqabad District in Zeberkhan County, Razavi Khorasan province, Iran.

== Demographics ==
=== Population ===
At the time of the 2006 National Census, the village's population was 325 in 68 households, when it was in Eshaqabad Rural District of the former Zeberkhan District in Nishapur County. The following census in 2011 counted 310 people in 82 households. The 2016 census measured the population of the village as 307 people in 78 households.

In 2020, the district was separated from the county in the establishment of Zeberkhan County. The rural district was transferred to the new Eshaqabad District, and Hesar was transferred to Heshmatiyeh Rural District created in the same district.
