= Aziziyeh =

Village in Razavi Khorasan province, Iran

Aziziyeh Persian: عزيزيه
- Village
- Location within Iran
- Coordinates: 35°59′35″N 59°02′05″E
- Country: Iran
- Province: Razavi Khorasan
- County: Zeberkhan
- District: Eshaqabad
- Rural District: Heshmatiyeh

Population (2016)
  - Total: 54
- Time zone: UTC+3:30 (IRST)

Aziziyeh (Persian: عزيزيه) (Note: Also romanized as ‘Azīzīyeh) is a village in Heshmatiyeh Rural District of Eshaqabad District in Zeberkhan County, Razavi Khorasan province, Iran.

== Demographics ==
=== Population ===
At the time of the 2006 National Census, the village's population was 53 in 15 households, when it was in Eshaqabad Rural District of the former Zeberkhan District in Nishapur County. The following census in 2011 counted 46 people in 14 households. The 2016 census measured the population of the village as 54 people in 17 households.

In 2020, the district was separated from the county in the establishment of Zeberkhan County. The rural district was transferred to the new Eshaqabad District, and Aziziyeh was transferred to Heshmatiyeh Rural District created in the same district.
