= Kalateh-ye Hajji Jahan Beyk =

Village in Razavi Khorasan province, Iran

Kalateh-ye Hajji Jahan Beyk Persian: كلاته حاجي جهان بيك
- Village
- Location within Iran
- Coordinates: 36°00′04″N 59°01′12″E
- Country: Iran
- Province: Razavi Khorasan
- County: Zeberkhan
- District: Eshaqabad
- Rural District: Eshaqabad

Population (2016)
  - Total: 193
- Time zone: UTC+3:30 (IRST)

Kalateh-ye Hajji Jahan Beyk (Persian: كلاته حاجي جهان بيك) (Note: Also romanized as Kalāteh-ye Ḩājjī Jahān Beyk) is a village in Eshaqabad Rural District of Eshaqabad District in Zeberkhan County, Razavi Khorasan province, Iran.

== Demographics ==
=== Population ===
At the time of the 2006 National Census, the village's population was 199 in 57 households, when it was in the former Zeberkhan District of Nishapur County. The following census in 2011 counted 183 people in 54 households. The 2016 census measured the population of the village as 193 people in 63 households.

In 2020, the district was separated from the county in the establishment of Zeberkhan County, and the rural district was transferred to the new Eshaqabad District.
