= Yusefabad, Zeberkhan =

Village in Razavi Khorasan province, Iran

Yusefabad Persian: يوسف اباد
- Village
- Location within Iran
- Coordinates: 36°03′30″N 58°59′58″E
- Country: Iran
- Province: Razavi Khorasan
- County: Zeberkhan
- District: Eshaqabad
- Rural District: Eshaqabad

Population (2016)
  - Total: 772
- Time zone: UTC+3:30 (IRST)

Yusefabad (Persian: يوسف اباد) (Note: Also romanized as Yūsefābād and Yūsefābad; also known as Yūsaofābād) is a village in Eshaqabad Rural District of Eshaqabad District in Zeberkhan County, Razavi Khorasan province, Iran.

== Demographics ==
=== Population ===
At the time of the 2006 National Census, the village's population was 648 in 183 households, when it was in the former Zeberkhan District of Nishapur County. The following census in 2011 counted 682 people in 207 households. The 2016 census measured the population of the village as 772 people in 233 households.

In 2020, the district was separated from the county in the establishment of Zeberkhan County, and the rural district was transferred to the new Eshaqabad District.
