= Arastradero Preserve =

Nature preserve in California

Coordinates: 37°23′13″N 122°10′29″W

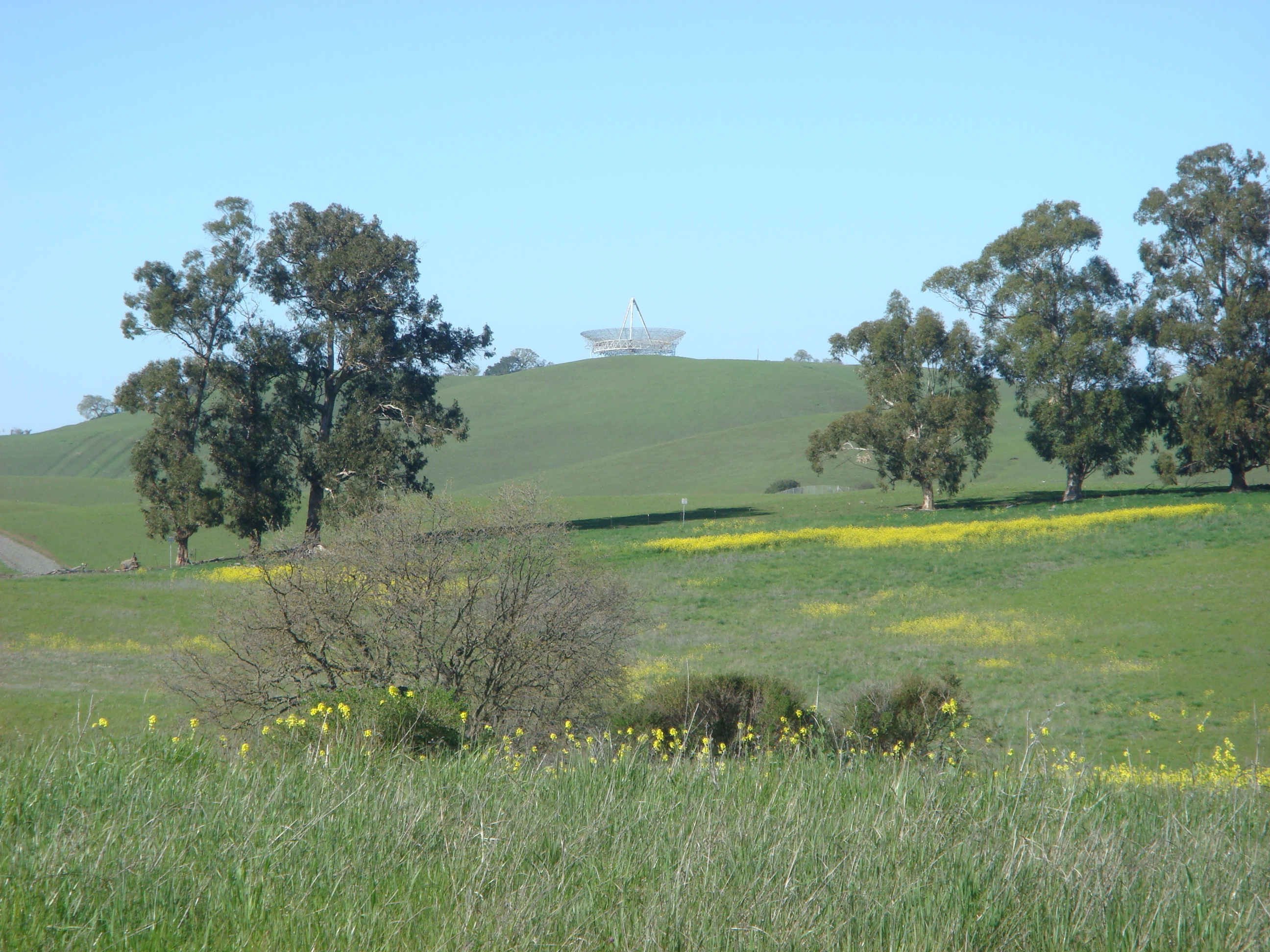
View from Arastradero Preserve, the Stanford Dish is in the background

Arastradero Preserve, officially known as Enid W. Pearson–Arastradero Preserve, is a 622 acres (252 hectares) nature preserve that protects most of the Arastradero Creek watershed, including its ephemeral Mayfly Creek tributary. It also includes the upper reach of the Felt Creek tributary to Stanford's Felt Reservoir. The preserve is owned and operated by the City of Palo Alto, California. The main parking lot hosts an interpretive center and is located at 1530 Arastradero Road (37°23'13" N, 122°10'29" W).

== Description ==
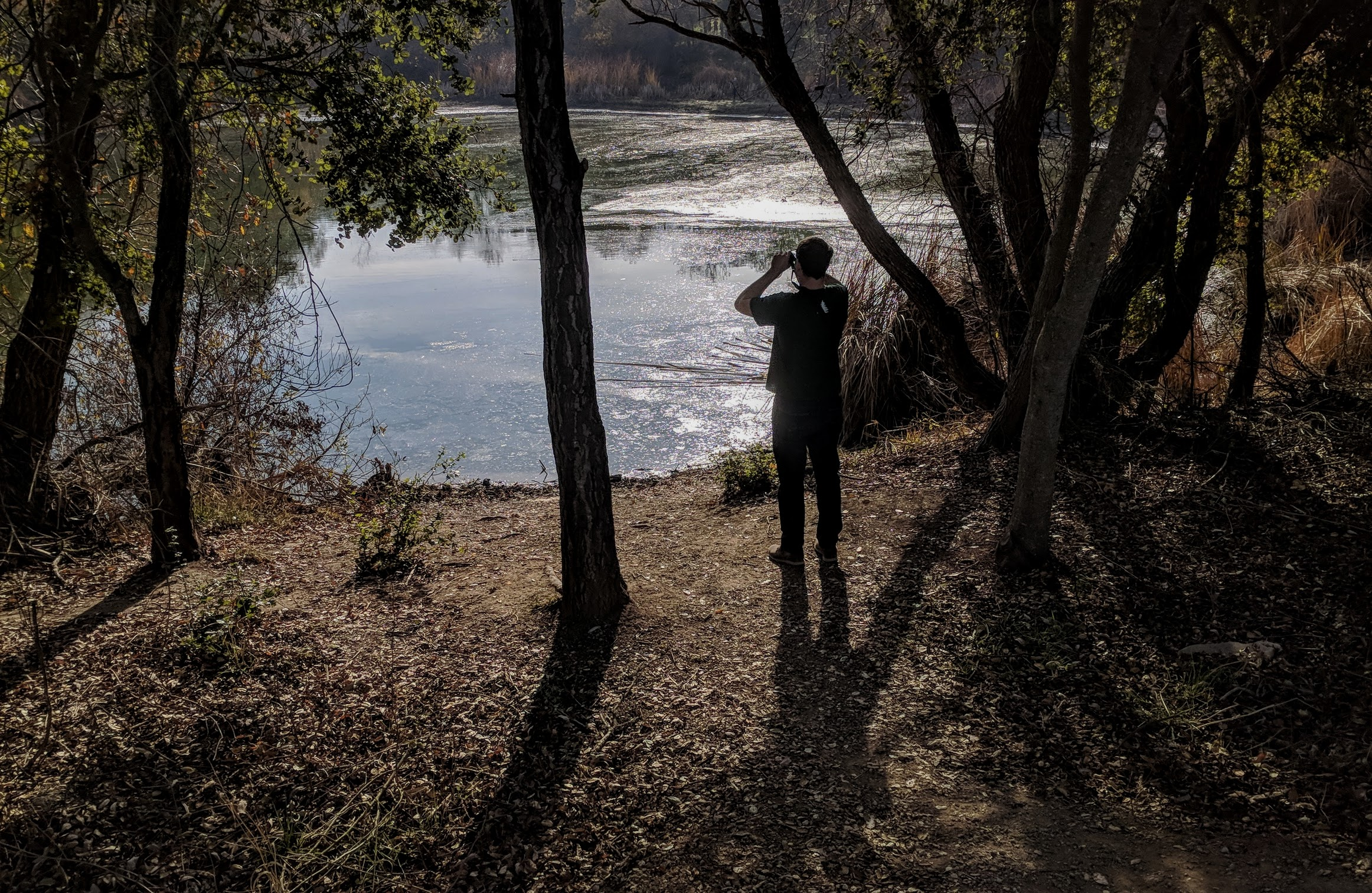
Watching water birds on Arastradero Lake

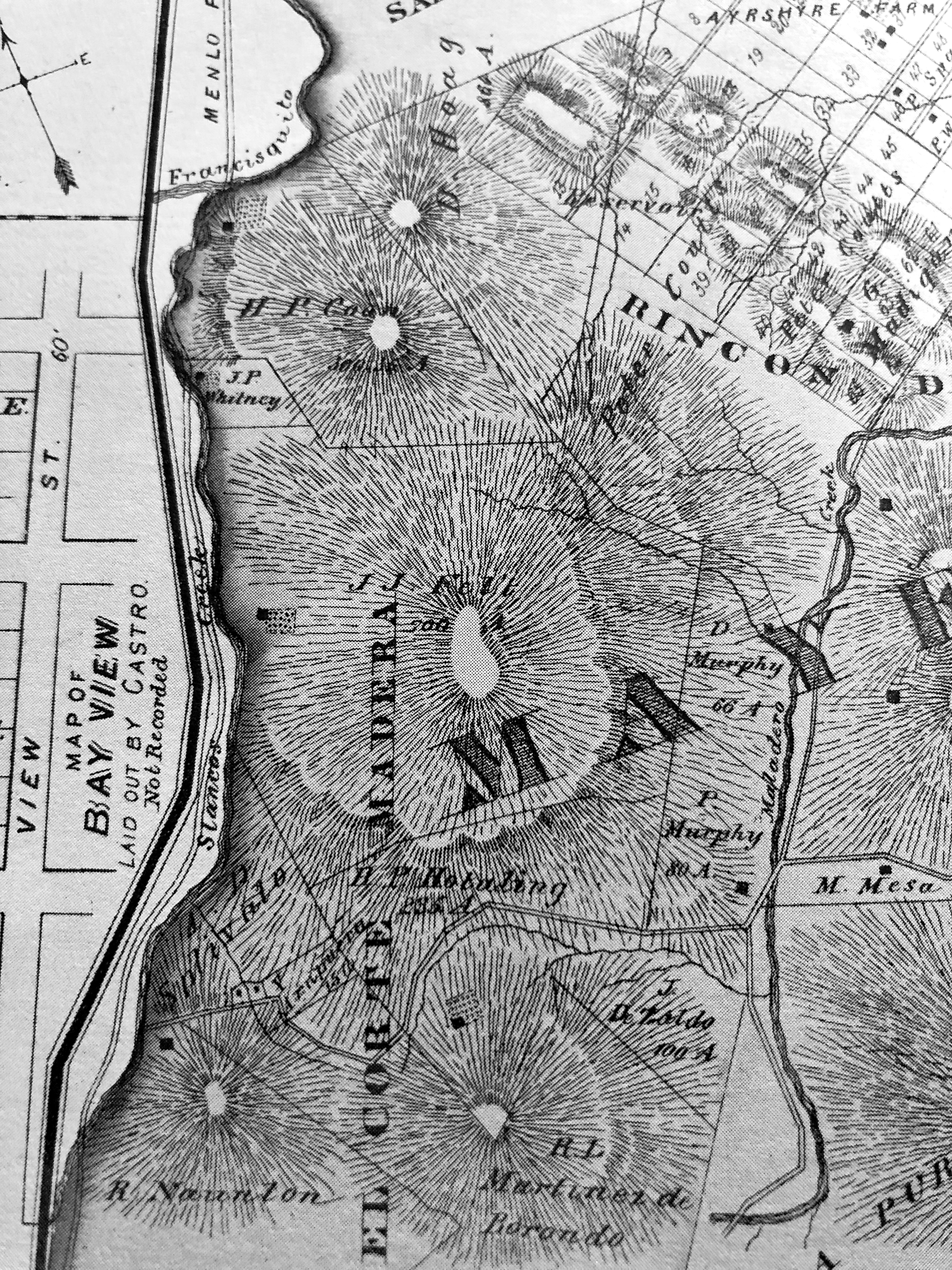
1876 Historical Map Shows Matadero Creek and Los Trancos (Stancos) Creek as well as unnamed Arastradero Creek and Felt Creek near Arastradero Road

Arastradero Preserve consists of rolling savanna grassland hills and evergreen forests; the preserve varies in elevation from 275 feet (84 m) in the northeast to 775 feet (236 m) in the southwest. There are four gates (labeled A, B, C, and D) into the preserve, though public parking is available only at Gate A on the North side. Gate D connects to Foothills Park as part of the Bay-to-Ridge Trail. The park is also accessible from a pedestrian footpath that leads to the residential area on the street Paseo del Roble.

The east portion of the preserve protects Arastradero Creek, which flows into Matadero Creek at the junction of Arastradero Road and Page Mill Road. Near the East side about a quarter mile south of the entrance is Arastradero Lake, and further south up into the preserve is Sobey Pond. The lake is also about 0.2 miles from the Paseo del Roble entrance. The southwest portion of the preserve protects seasonal Felt Creek, which runs beneath Arastradero Road and is diverted to Felt Lake. In wet years, Felt Lake releases flows which reach Los Trancos Creek, a San Francisquito Creek tributary.

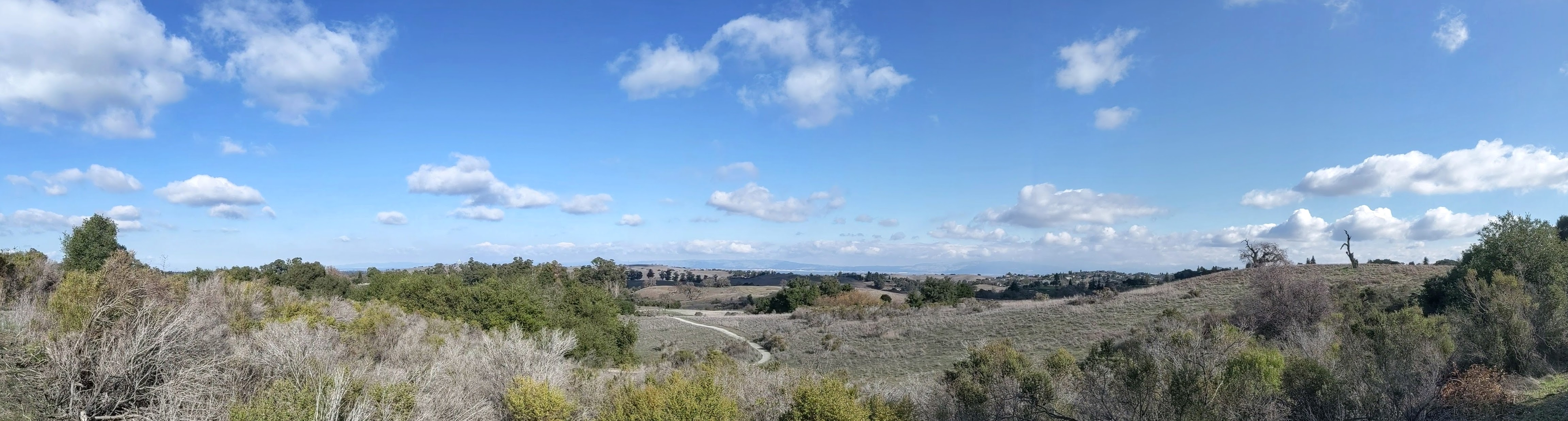
Panoramic view of Arastradero Preserve from high on the Meadowlark Trail, looking north and east

== Ecology ==
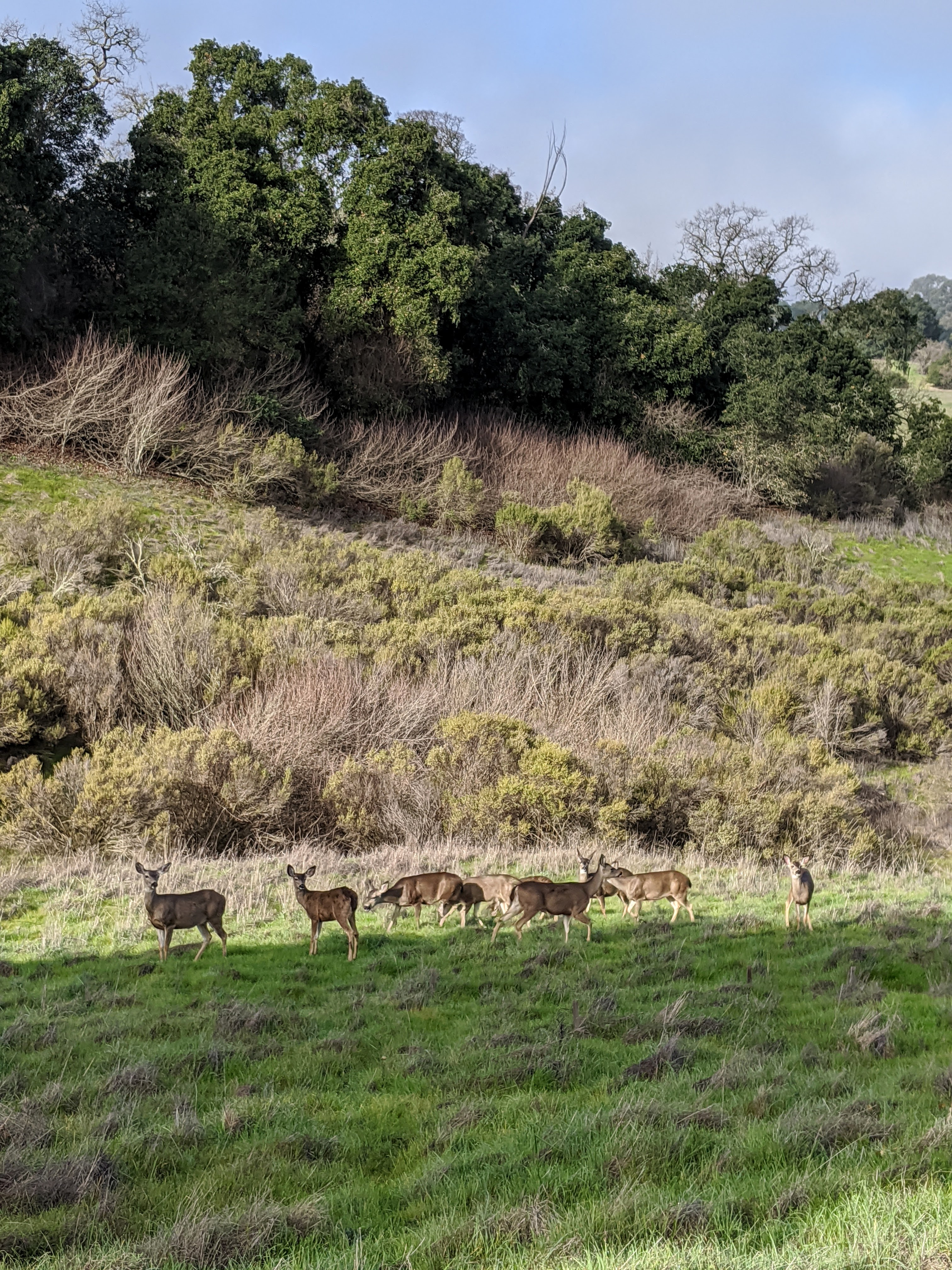
Deer as seen from the preserve's Wild Rye Trail

The preserve contains an abundance of wildlife, including deer, bobcats, coyotes, snakes, and many species of birds. The preserve and the surrounding area are habitats for the California puma (Puma concolor is also locally known as mountain lion). There are regular sightings of puma and coyotes in the areas, and people hiking with dogs or small children should be cautious.

From 2016 through 2020, a pair of bald eagles (Haliaeetus leucocephalus) has nested in a large eucalyptus tree near Felt Lake and the preserve.

== Trails ==
The Pearson–Arastradero Preserve has 10.25 miles (16.50 km) of trails for hiking, biking and horseback riding. While many of the trails are open year-round, some trails are designated as "seasonal" and are closed at the trailhead temporarily after heavy rain. The trails at Arastradero Preserve include Acorn, Arastradeo Creek, Bay Laurel, Bowl Loop, Juan Bautista de Anza, Meadowlark, Ohlone, Paseo del Roble, Portola Pastures, Redtail Loop, Wild Rye, Woodland Star, and Woodrat.

== Restoration and stewardship activities ==
Grassroots Ecology, a local environmental nonprofit, has run a collaborative stewardship program on the preserve in cooperation with the City of Palo Alto since 1997. Volunteers and Grassroots Ecology staff work to improve the Preserve by eliminating invasive weeds such as non-native thistles, planting native species such as blue wild rye and engaging local youth and community members.

== Surroundings and history ==
Portions of Arastradero Preserve border Foothills Park (on the South side), the Palo Alto Golf Course (on the East side), open land owned by Stanford University (to the North), and one of the campuses of Palo Alto University (to the West). From the hills on the North Side, one can see Felt Lake which is otherwise difficult to see from public lands except Vista Hill in Foothills Park. Because most of the golf course in on a flat mesa at a higher elevation than the preserve, the golf course is largely invisible from the preserve.

There remains a small piece of private property adjacent to Arastradero Road surrounded on all sides by the preserve which currently has no structures. There had been a private home deep within the preserve until the late 1990s which has now been torn down.

In 2006 a small visitor center was erected near the parking lot entrance which contains a miniature scale model of the park and exhibits explaining the ecology, flora, and fauna of the region.
