= Arastradero Creek =

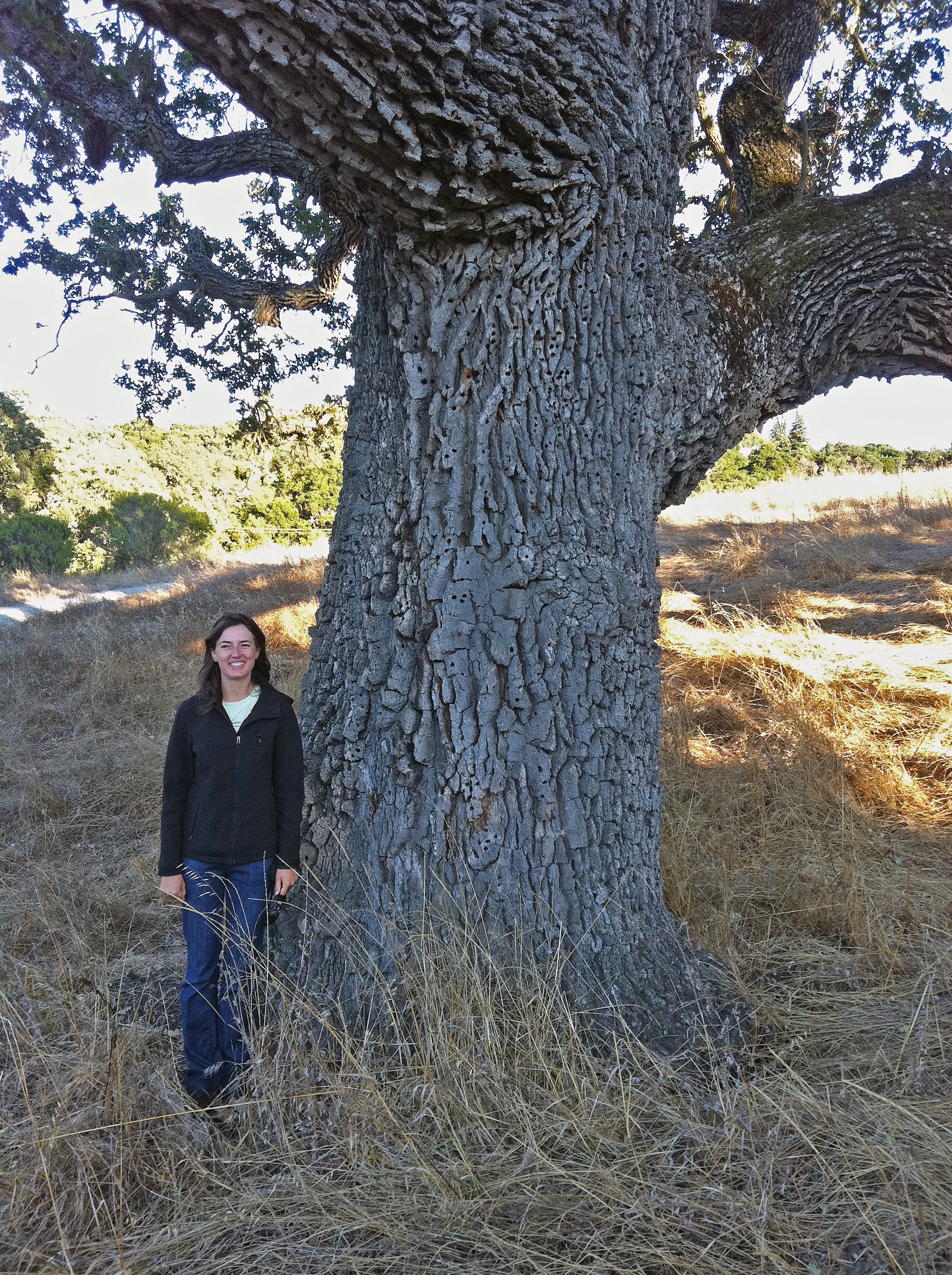
- Joan Dudney, former Acterra Steward for Arastradero Preserve, stands by an ancient valley oak (Quercus lobata) just southwest of Arastradero Lake. This tree is over 300 years old and is an acorn granary for acorn woodpeckers (Melanerpes formicivorus).

- Location of the mouth of Arastradero Creek in California

Location
- Country: United States
- State: California
- Region: Santa Clara County
- Cities: Palo Alto, California, Los Altos Hills, California

Physical characteristics
- Source: Palo Alto Foothills of the Santa Cruz Mountains
  - location: Palo Alto
  - coordinates: 37°22′04″N 122°10′29″W
  - elevation: 820 ft (250 m)
- Mouth: Confluence with Matadero Creek
  - location: Los Altos Hills
  - coordinates: 37°23′03″N 122°09′58″W
  - elevation: 262 ft (80 m)

Basin features
- Tributaries
  - left: Mayfly Creek

Arastradero Creek is a mainly seasonal 2.4-mile-long (3.9 km) generally north by northeastward-flowing stream originating in the Palo Alto foothills of the Santa Cruz Mountains in Santa Clara County, California, United States. It is almost wholly protected by the Pearson–Arastradero Preserve, before joining Matadero Creek where its waters descend to San Francisco Bay.

== History ==
"Arrastre" is Spanish for the act of dragging, used for an ore mill, where heavy weights were dragged over ore, and "Arrastradero" means a place where dragging is done. In Spanish times, timber was dragged along Arastradero Road to help in the building of the Santa Clara Mission. It is also a synonym for the Altar of the Street Cleaner.

== Watershed and course ==
The Juan Bautista de Anza Trail ascends along the creek from Gate A of the Pearson–Arastradero Preserve, which is accessed from the preserve's interpretive center at 1530 Arastradero Road, 1/4 mile west of Page Mill Road. The willow-lined creek first reaches Sobey Pond, then further downstream it reaches Arastradero Lake, an artificial reservoir formed by an earthen dam that served as a former ranch stock pond. After Arastradero Lake, the Arastradero Creek Trail ascends along the creek to Sobey Pond and then continues upwards almost to the creek's source on the northern edge of Palo Alto's Foothills Park.

When the creek reaches Arastradero Road it is joined from the left by an ephemeral creek (locally named Mayfly Creek), and then turns abruptly east and flows along the road into Los Altos Hills to its confluence with Matadero Creek, at the intersection of Arastradero Road with Page Mill Road.

== Habitat and conservation ==
The Arastradero Preserve is unusual in its intensive ecological restoration program where Grassroots Ecology, a Palo Alto-based environmental group, acts as a steward for the preserve and engages community volunteers in programs that combine habitat restoration with environmental education and accommodate a wide range of volunteers from high schools to local corporations. Their projects focus primarily on removing yellow star thistle (Centaurea solstitialis), Medusahead grass (Taeniatherum caput-medusae), poison hemlock (Conium maculatum), Italian thistle (Carduus pycnocephalus), wild mustard and teasel and replacing these invasives with native species. In 2006, Acterra conducted a large-scale creek daylighting project and continues to work on creek stabilization, sediment harvesting and planting riparian species. Reforestation projects focus on native oaks, including planting and caging young native oaks, and removal of high fire-danger eucalyptus. To encourage and support a greater diversity of fauna, Grassroots Ecology volunteers install nesting boxes, bird perches, raptor poles, bat houses, bee blocks and brush piles. The Santa Clara Valley Audubon Society maintains and places bird houses and co-leads bird hikes with Acterra. Currently Acterra is conducting a preserve-wide weed and biodiversity hotspot map to guide future management strategies. There is an installation of native flora at the preserve's interpretive center.

In 2005, the City of Palo Alto received a grant from the California Coastal Conservancy to daylight the Mayfly Creek tributary to Arastradero Creek. This tributary was buried in a culvert under a horse ranch that had been purchased from the Bressler family with help from the Peninsula Open Space Trust. According to Grassroots Ecology Senior Ecologist, Claire Elliott, sinuous, ephemeral Mayfly Creek was named for the mayfly (family Ephemeroptera), as it was the first insect to re-colonize the daylighted creek. The creek's course was re-established and planted with thousands of native plant species along the banks. Grassroots Ecology continues to restore the area by creating check dams to slow water flow, while removing invasive flora and replacing them with natives. Thanks to hundreds of volunteers, the once degraded habitat now reflects a more sustainable, native ecosystem.

== Recreation ==
The Pearson–Arastradero Preserve has 10.3 miles (17 km) of trails for hiking, biking and horseback riding, but some trails are designated as "seasonal" and are closed because of vulnerability to erosion in heavy rain. Arastradero Lake is a twenty-minute hike from the parking lot and is open all year to fishing, although boats, flotation devices, and swimming are not permitted. The California Department of Fish and Game provides cautions when hiking in mountain lion (Puma concolor) territories.

Birds in the preserve
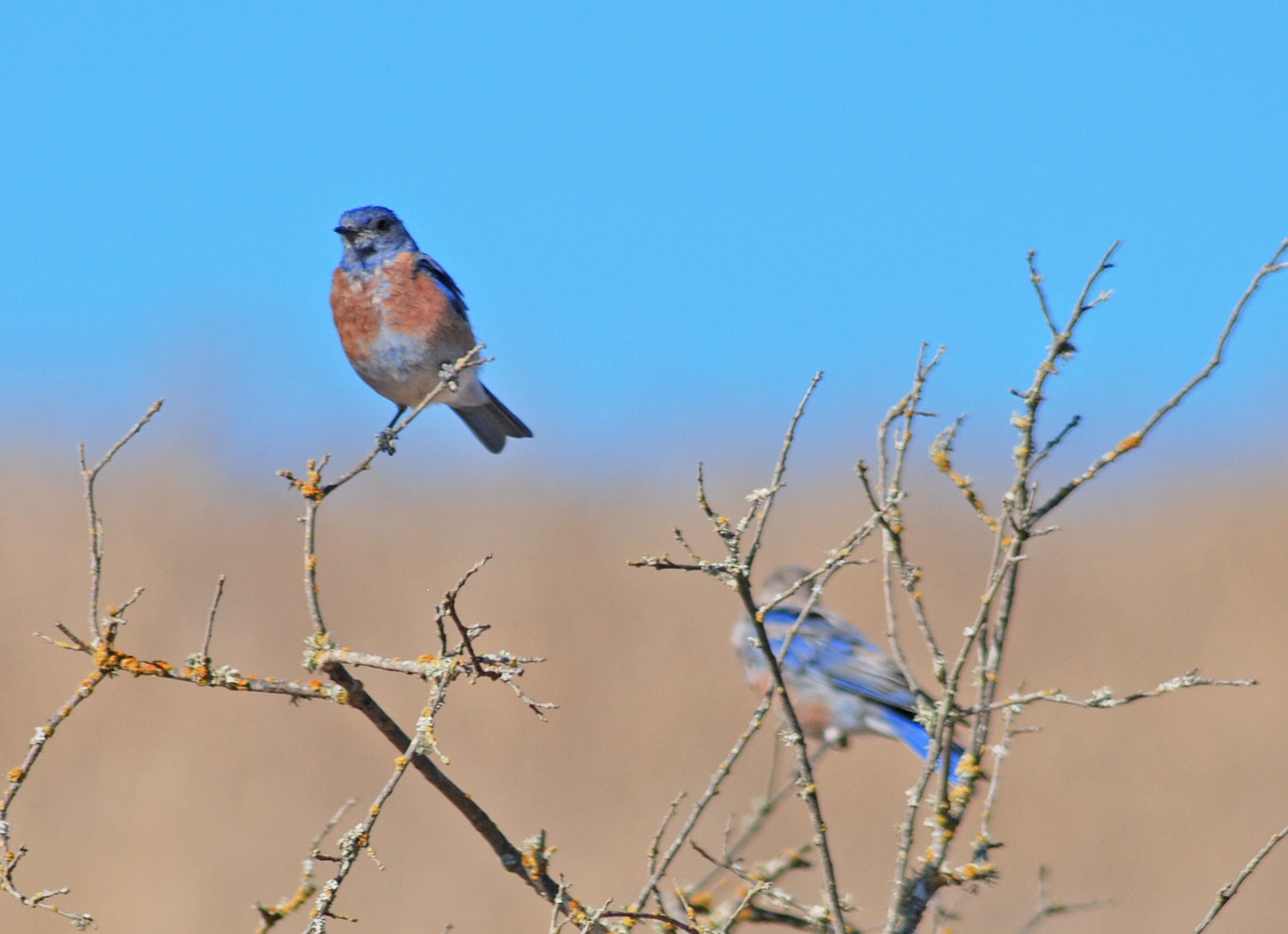
Western bluebirds (Sialia mexicana) populations have rebounded with placement of nesting boxes throughout the preserve.

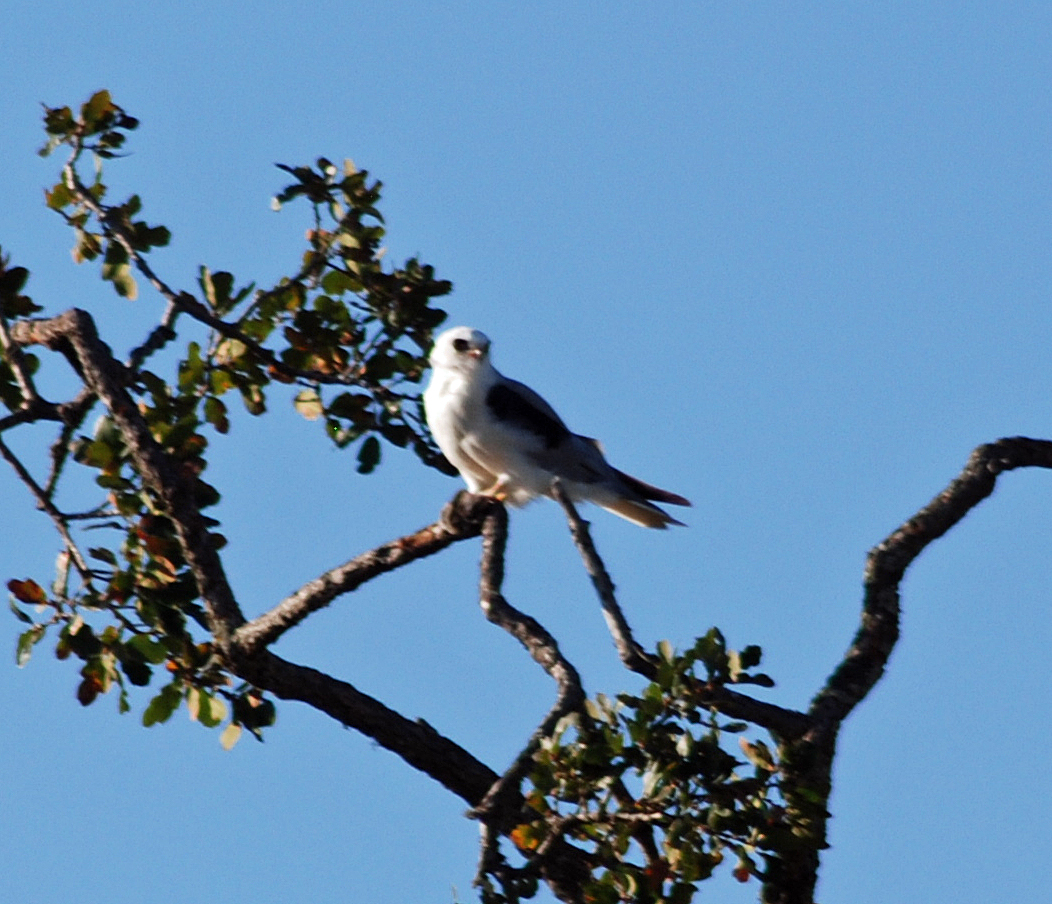
White-tailed kite (Elanus leucurus) atop oak at Arastradero Preserve

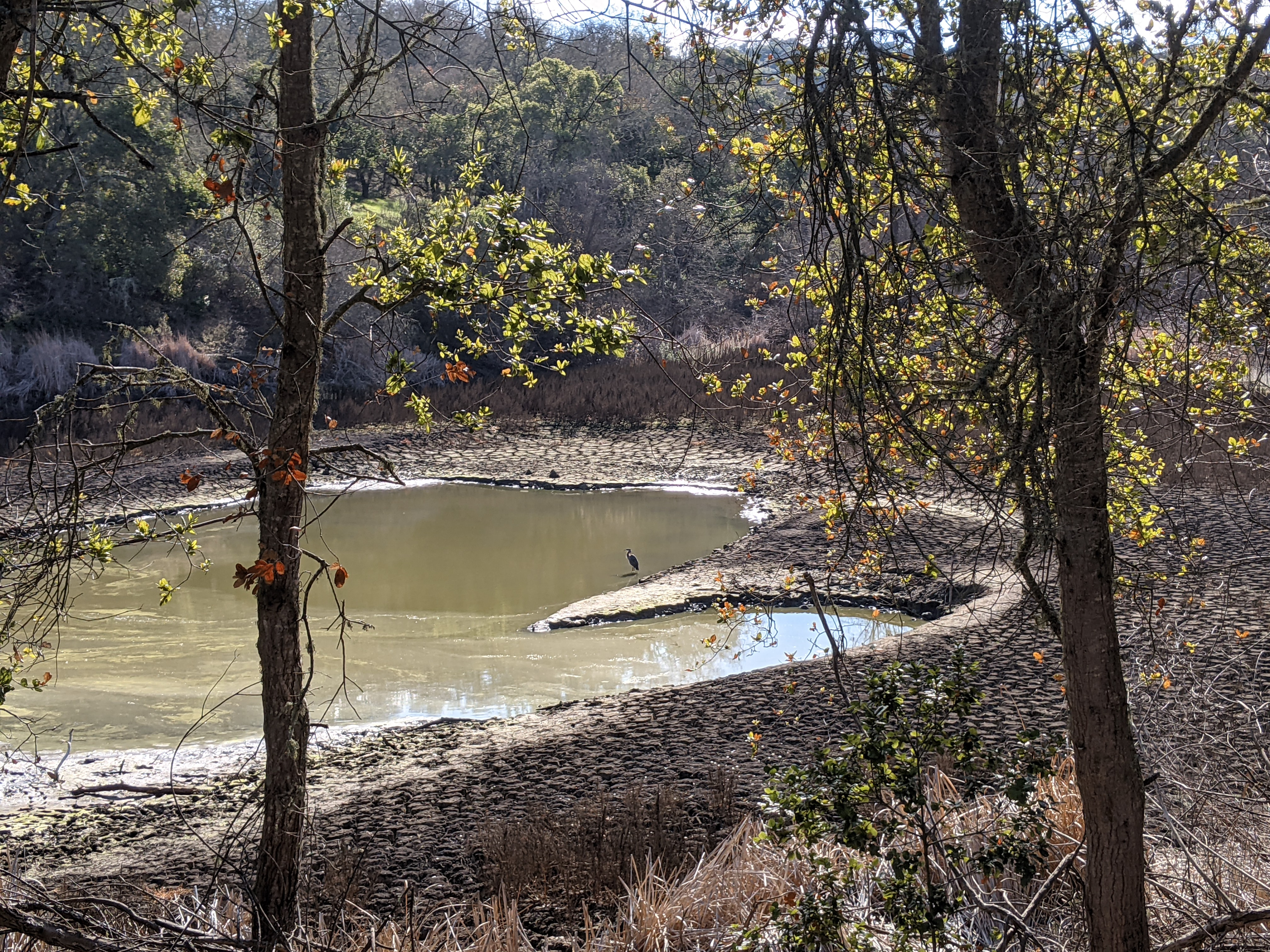
Great blue heron at Arastradero Lake during a long drought

== See also ==
- List of watercourses in the San Francisco Bay Area
