= Dishdish =

Village in Razavi Khorasan province, Iran

Dishdish Persian: ديشديش
- Village
- Location within Iran
- Coordinates: 36°00′37″N 59°03′03″E
- Country: Iran
- Province: Razavi Khorasan
- County: Zeberkhan
- District: Eshaqabad
- Rural District: Heshmatiyeh

Population (2016)
  - Total: 561
- Time zone: UTC+3:30 (IRST)

Dishdish (Persian: ديشديش) (Note: Also romanized as Dīsh Dīsh and Dīshdīsh) is a village in Heshmatiyeh Rural District of Eshaqabad District in Zeberkhan County, Razavi Khorasan province, Iran.

== Demographics ==
=== Population ===
At the time of the 2006 National Census, the village's population was 519 in 140 households, when it was in Eshaqabad Rural District of the former Zeberkhan District in Nishapur County. The following census in 2011 counted 540 people in 165 households. The 2016 census measured the population of the village as 561 people in 182 households.

In 2020, the district was separated from the county in the establishment of Zeberkhan County. The rural district was transferred to the new Eshaqabad District, and Dishdish was transferred to Heshmatiyeh Rural District created in the same district.
