= Ahovan =

Village in Razavi Khorasan province, Iran

Ahovan Persian: اهوان
- Village
- Location within Iran
- Coordinates: 36°05′26″N 58°58′22″E
- Country: Iran
- Province: Razavi Khorasan
- County: Zeberkhan
- District: Eshaqabad
- Rural District: Eshaqabad

Population (2016)
  - Total: 707
- Time zone: UTC+3:30 (IRST)

Ahovan (Persian: اهوان) (Note: Also romanized as Āhovān) is a village in Eshaqabad Rural District of Eshaqabad District in Zeberkhan County, Razavi Khorasan province, Iran.

== Demographics ==
=== Population ===
At the time of the 2006 National Census, the village's population was 391 in 118 households, when it was in the former Zeberkhan District of Nishapur County. The following census in 2011 counted 431 people in 134 households. The 2016 census measured the population of the village as 707 people in 219 households.

In 2020, the district was separated from the county in the establishment of Zeberkhan County, and the rural district was transferred to the new Eshaqabad District.
