= Dastjerd-e Aqa Bozorg =

Village in Razavi Khorasan province, Iran

Dastjerd-e Aqa Bozorg Persian: دستجرداقابزرگ
- Village
- Location within Iran
- Coordinates: 36°04′33″N 58°58′33″E
- Country: Iran
- Province: Razavi Khorasan
- County: Zeberkhan
- District: Eshaqabad
- Rural District: Eshaqabad

Population (2016)
  - Total: 1,096
- Time zone: UTC+3:30 (IRST)

Dastjerd-e Aqa Bozorg (Persian: دستجرداقابزرگ) (Note: Also romanized as Dastjerd-e Āqā Bozorg and Dastjerd-e Aqā Bozorg; also known as Dashtjerd-e Āqā Bozorg and Dastgerd) is a village in Eshaqabad Rural District of Eshaqabad District in Zeberkhan County, Razavi Khorasan province, Iran.

== Demographics ==
=== Population ===
At the time of the 2006 National Census, the village's population was 1,061 in 266 households, when it was in the former Zeberkhan District of Nishapur County. The following census in 2011 counted 1,031 people in 318 households. The 2016 census measured the population of the village as 1,096 people in 352 households.

In 2020, the district was separated from the county in the establishment of Zeberkhan County, and the rural district was transferred to the new Eshaqabad District.
