= Fathabad, Zeberkhan =

Village in Razavi Khorasan province, Iran

Fathabad Persian: فتح اباد
- Village
- Location within Iran
- Coordinates: 36°04′42″N 58°57′22″E
- Country: Iran
- Province: Razavi Khorasan
- County: Zeberkhan
- District: Eshaqabad
- Rural District: Eshaqabad

Population (2016)
  - Total: Below reporting threshold
- Time zone: UTC+3:30 (IRST)

Fathabad (Persian: فتح اباد) (Note: Also romanized as Fatḩābād) is a village in Eshaqabad Rural District of Eshaqabad District in Zeberkhan County, Razavi Khorasan province, Iran.

== Demographics ==
=== Population ===
At the time of the 2006 National Census, the village's population was 16 in five households, when it was in the former Zeberkhan District of Nishapur County. The following censuses in 2011 and 2016 counted a population below the reporting threshold.

In 2020, the district was separated from the county in the establishment of Zeberkhan County, and the rural district was transferred to the new Eshaqabad District.
