= Eshaqabad, Zeberkhan =

City in Razavi Khorasan province, Iran

Eshaqabad Persian: اسحق اباد
- City
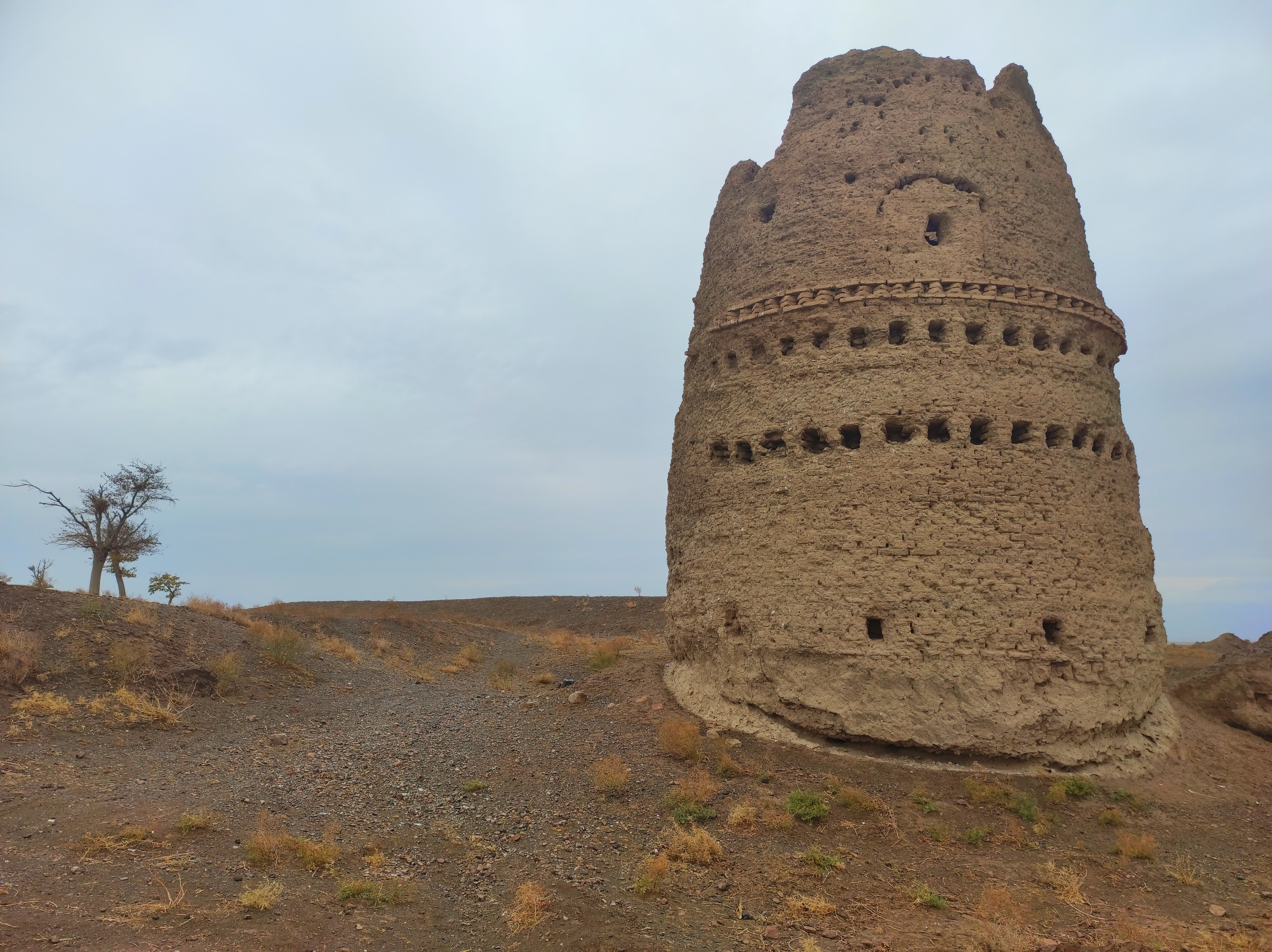
- An historic tower in Eshaqabad

- Location within Iran
- Coordinates: 36°01′45″N 59°00′28″E
- Country: Iran
- Province: Razavi Khorasan
- County: Zeberkhan
- District: Eshaqabad
- Established as a city: 2021

Population (2016)
  - Total: 4,288
- Time zone: UTC+3:30 (IRST)

Eshaqabad (Persian: اسحق اباد) (Note: Also romanized as Es’hāq Ābād and Esḩāqābād) is a city in, and the capital of, Eshaqabad District in Zeberkhan County, Razavi Khorasan province, Iran. It also serves as the administrative center for Eshaqabad Rural District.

== Demographics ==
=== Population ===
At the time of the 2006 National Census, Eshaqabad's population was 3,810 in 988 households, when it was a village in Eshaqabad Rural District of the former Zeberkhan District in Nishapur County. The following census in 2011 counted 4,149 people in 1,224 households. The 2016 census measured the population of the village as 4,288 people in 1,312 households, the most populous in its rural district.

In 2020, the district was separated from the county in the establishment of Zeberkhan County, and the rural district was transferred to the new Eshaqabad District. Eshaqabad was converted to a city in 2021.
