= The Dish (disambiguation) =

The Dish may refer to:

- The Dish, a 2000 Australian historical comedy-drama film
- The Dish (landmark), a radio antenna in the hills above Stanford University in California, or its surrounding area
- The Dish (TV series), a satirical American television show
- The Dish, a gossip website created by Jonathan Cheban
- The Daily Dish (later The Weekly Dish), a political blog started by Andrew Sullivan
