= Heshmatiyeh Rural District =

Rural district in Razavi Khorasan province, Iran

Heshmatiyeh Rural District Persian: دهستان حشمتیه
- Rural District
- Location within Iran
- Coordinates: 35°57′N 59°03′E
- Country: Iran
- Province: Razavi Khorasan
- County: Zeberkhan
- District: Eshaqabad
- Established: 2020
- Capital: Heshmatiyeh
- Time zone: UTC+3:30 (IRST)

Heshmatiyeh Rural District (Persian: دهستان حشمتیه) is in Eshaqabad District of Zeberkhan County, Razavi Khorasan province, Iran. Its capital is the village of Heshmatiyeh, whose population at the time of the 2016 National Census was 540 in 171 households.

== History ==
In 2020, Zeberkhan District was separated from Nishapur County in the establishment of Zeberkhan County, and Heshmatiyeh Rural District was created in the new Eshaqabad District.

== Other villages in the rural district ==
- Ahmadabad
- Aziziyeh
- Dishdish
- Ebrahimabad
- Esmatabad
- Fakhrabad
- Hesar
- Hoseynabad
- Jahanabad
- Kalateh-ye Qanbar
- Nowbahar
