= Disch =

Disch is a surname of German origins. Notable people with the name include:

- Billy Disch (1872–1953), American baseball player and coach
- George Disch (1879–1950) was a pitcher in Major League Baseball
- Rolf Disch (born 1944), German architect, solar energy pioneer and environmental activist
- Thomas M. Disch (1940–2008), American science fiction author and poet
- William Disch (1840–1912), member of the Wisconsin State Assembly

== See also ==
- Disch Promontory, located in Antarctica
- Disch Field, baseball field located in Austin, Texas (Now called Disch-Falk Field)
