= Let's Dish! =

Minnesotan meal preparation company

- Industry: Food
- Headquarters: Minneapolis, United States
- Services: Pre-packaged meals
- Website: http://www.letsdish.com/

Let's Dish! is a Minneapolis-based meal-preparation company founded on October 22, 2003. The company's business model allows customers to pick up pre-packaged and pre-assembled meals.

== History ==
The company was founded by Darcy Olson and Ruth Lindquist. Since 2005, Let's Dish! has nine stores.
