= Foothills Nature Preserve =

Park in Palo Alto, California, United States

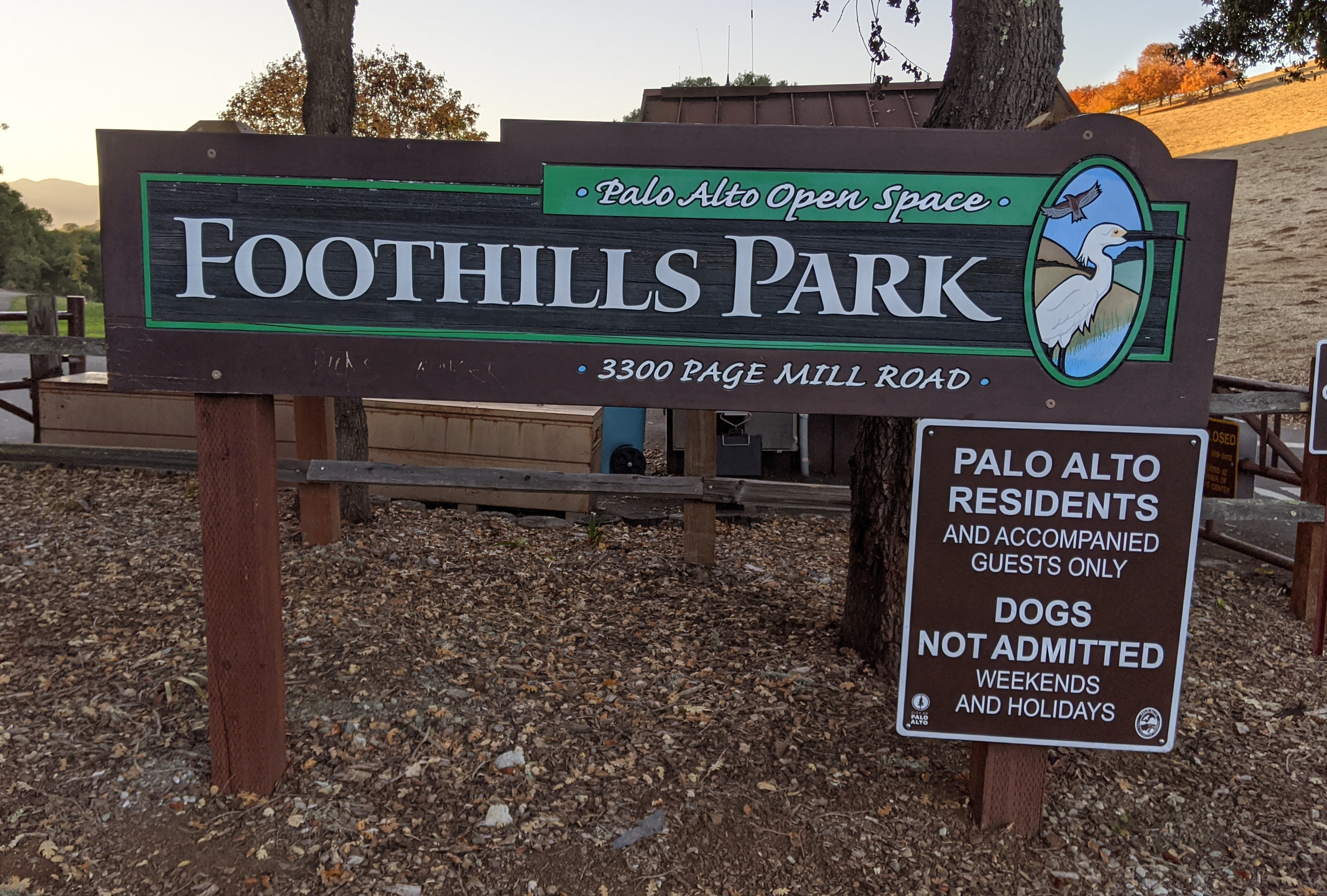
- The entrance to Foothills Nature Preserve from Page Mill Road
- Interactive map of Foothills Nature Preserve
- Coordinates: 37.354°N 122.185°W
- Area: 1,400-acre (570 ha)
- Created: 1965
- Operator: Palo Alto

Foothills Nature Preserve (formerly named Foothills Park) is a 1,400-acre (570 ha) park and nature preserve in the Santa Cruz Mountains of California, United States, within the city of Palo Alto. From 1969 until 2020, only residents or city employees of Palo Alto and their guests had lawful access to it, a restriction that has sparked "decades-long" controversy and a 2020 ACLU lawsuit. The park was opened to the general public on December 17, 2020.

== Geography ==
The park is located in Palo Alto in the eastern foothills of the Santa Cruz Mountains, bordered on most of its eastern boundary by Page Mill Road. To the north and the lowlands is the Arastradero Preserve also owned by Palo Alto and to the south is Los Trancos Open Space Preserve owned by the Midpeninsula Regional Open Space District. The small Foothills Open Space Preserve also owned by the district is adjacent for part of the east side. Los Trancos Creek is the southwestern boundary of the park and is joined south of the park by Buckeye Creek which flows through the park. The damming of a tributary of Buckeye Creek created Boronda Lake.

The park contains nearly one tenth of all land in Palo Alto. About 90 acres (36 ha) of the park are developed with amenities including a large grassy field, picnic sites, a walk-in, tent-only campground, and a nature interpretive center. Boronda lake is used for fishing, rowing, and canoeing. The park also has 15 miles (24 km) of trails.

The Bay-to-Ridge Trail, which when complete will link the Palo Alto Baylands Nature Preserve to the Bay Area Ridge Trail, runs through the park connecting Arastradero Preserve and Los Trancos Open Space. Non-Palo Alto residents could use the part of trail through the park when established in 2007 even though the rest of the park was restricted at that time.

== History ==
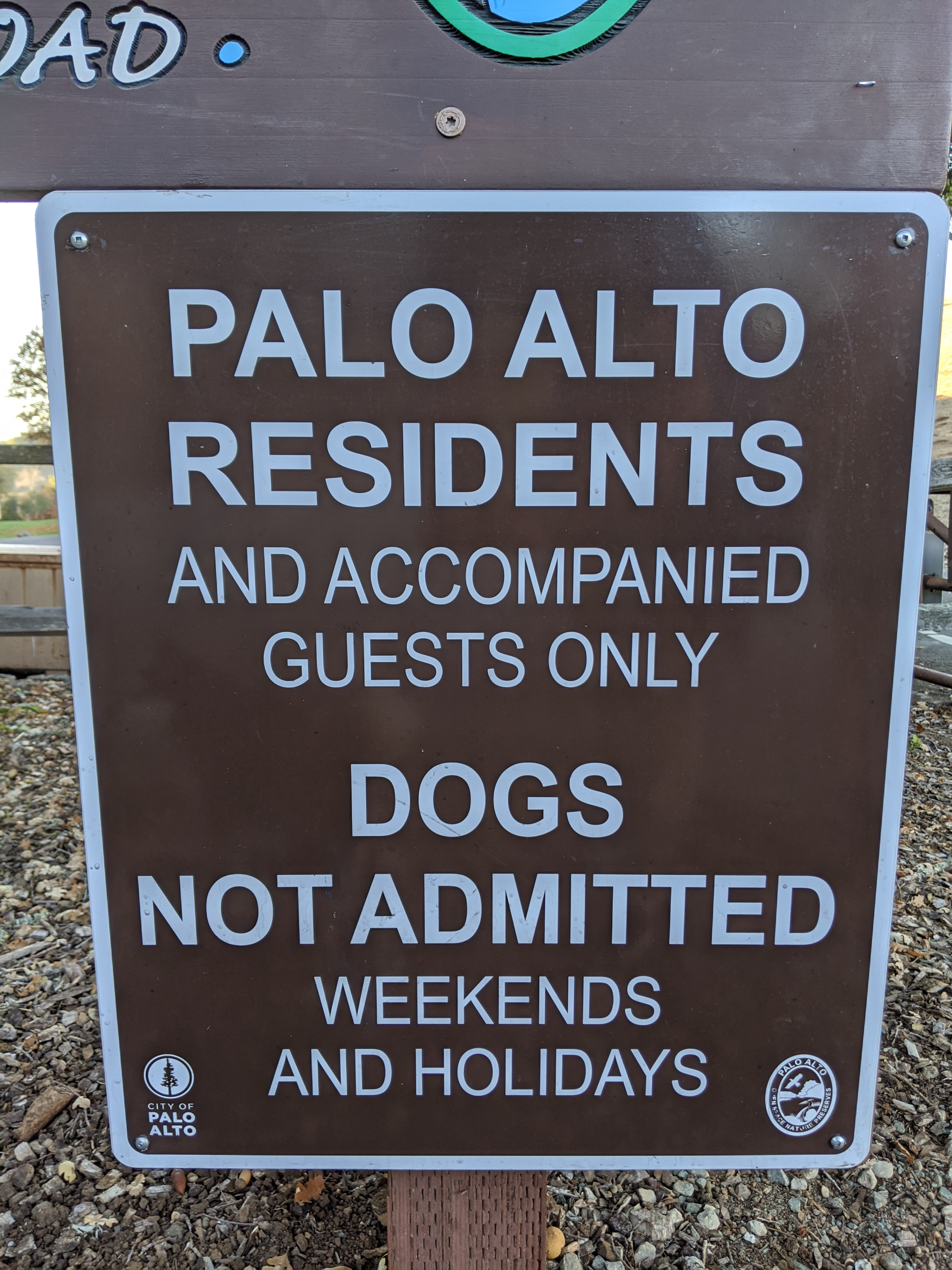
Sign previously on the entry gate

Most of the land for the park was bought from Russel V. Lee, a founder of the Palo Alto Medical Clinic (now Palo Alto Medical Foundation), who offered, in 1958, 1,294 acres of his land at $1,000 an acre ($1.3 million total) to the city to preserve as open space. The total cost was high so Palo Alto put it to a citywide vote in 1959 which passed with 62% of the voters supporting buying the land. The council also asked the neighboring communities of Portola Valley and Los Altos Hills to share in the cost, but they declined. Santa Clara County offered to cover about 40% of the cost ($500,000) in 1964, on the condition that the park be opened to all, but Palo Alto declined. The park opened on June 19, 1965, and the restriction limiting access to Palo Alto residents and their guests was put into place in 1969. In 2005, the county provided $2 million in grant funding to go towards the purchase of 13 additional acres of adjacent land, in exchange for which Palo Alto allowed anyone (nonresidents included) to freely pass through that area and enter Foothills Park, on trails from Arastradero Preserve. It was a misdemeanor for a nonresident to enter the park, unless they were traveling through on specific trails on foot. Enforcement was limited due to budget constraints; the gate was unstaffed on non-holiday weekdays and some weekends in the winter. The city also limited the total number of visitors at one time to 1,000 (approximately 370 vehicles).

Activists painted "DESEGREGATE" outside the front gate in July 2020, in protest of the policy that limited access to residents of Palo Alto and their guests. The policy did not discriminate by race, but they believed it "is closely tied to racist practices of the past". In August 2020, the City Council voted to run a one-year pilot study that would open the nature preserve for limited permits to non-residents on a "revenue-neutral" basis, which in practice means a minimal ($6) entry charge "to recover a portion of the expenses associated with the existing cost of staffing the entry gate". Upon completion of the pilot study, the issue of whether or not to open the preserve to the general public will be placed on the ballot so that the residents of Palo Alto can vote on the issue.

In September 2020, the ACLU filed a lawsuit on behalf of the local NAACP, calling the restriction "unconstitutional". The lawsuit contends that the policy "infringes on the plaintiffs’ fundamental rights of freedom of movement, freedom of speech and freedom of assembly".

Due to the lawsuit, on November 3, 2020 the city council agreed to rescind the policy by a 5–2 vote. On November 16, the decision was finalized to open the park on December 17, 2020. Entrance fees are charged on weekends starting February 27, 2021. Annual passes have a discount for city residents and employees. On February 22, 2021, the City Council authorized the City Manager to set the visitor limit between 300 and 650 people at a time, a decrease from the initial plan of 750 increasing to 1000 after 90 days. On January 25, 2021, federal district judge Edward Davila issued a permanent injunction order prohibiting Palo Alto from bringing back the residents-only requirement.

On February 22, 2021, the Palo Alto City Council voted to change the name of the park from "Foothills Park" to "Foothills Nature Preserve".

== Gallery ==
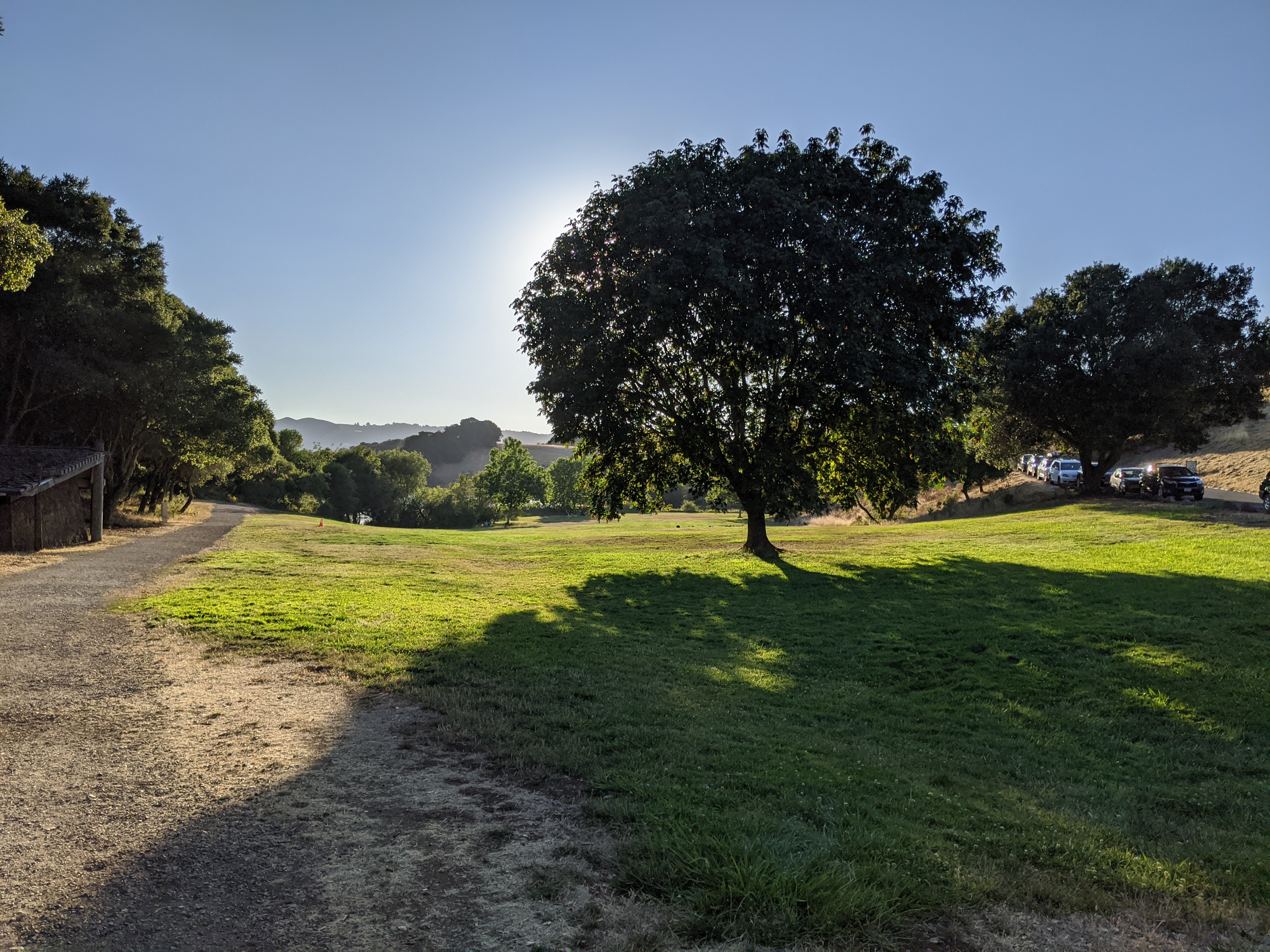
The view from the main entrance

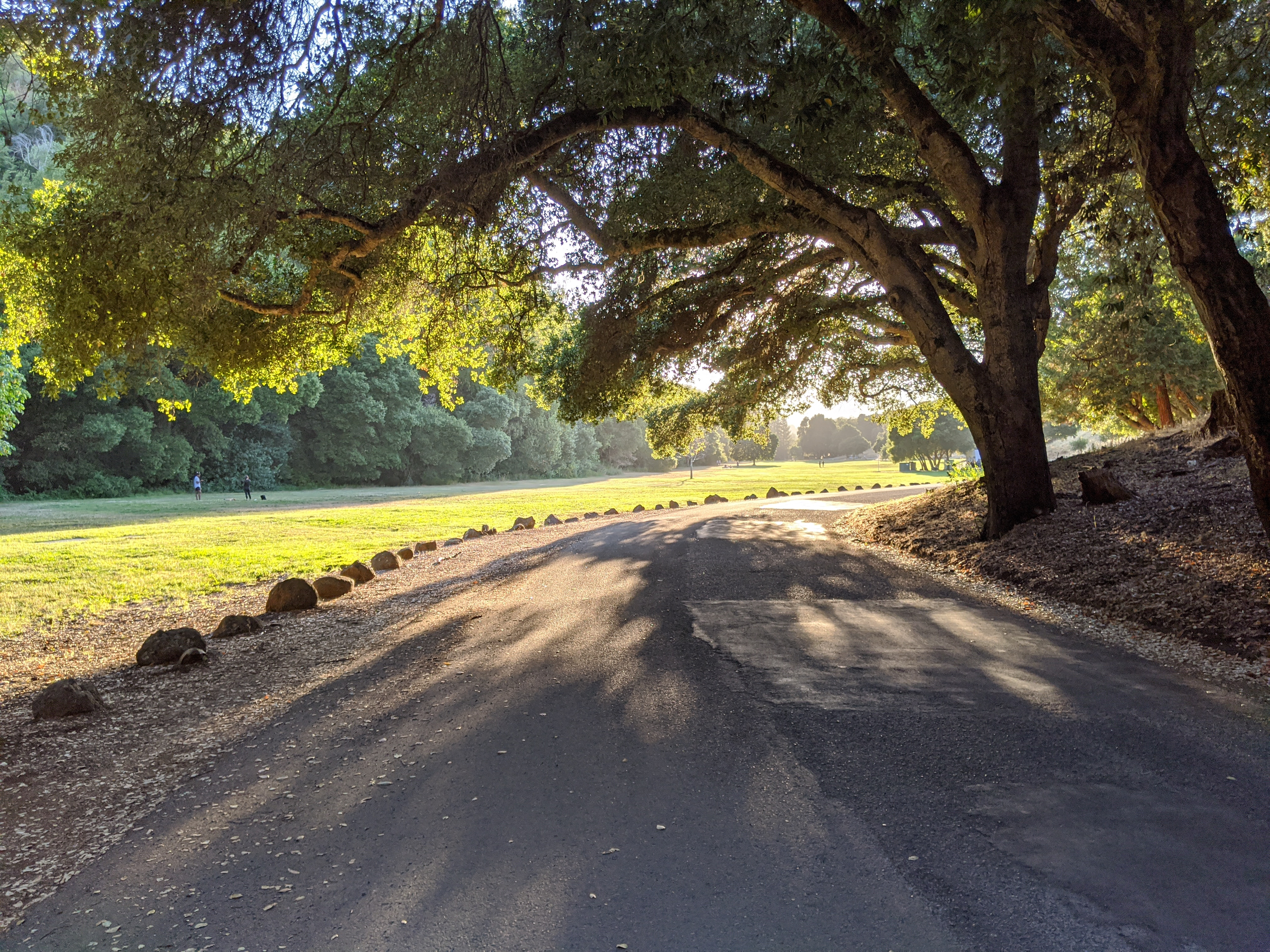
Las Trampas Valley

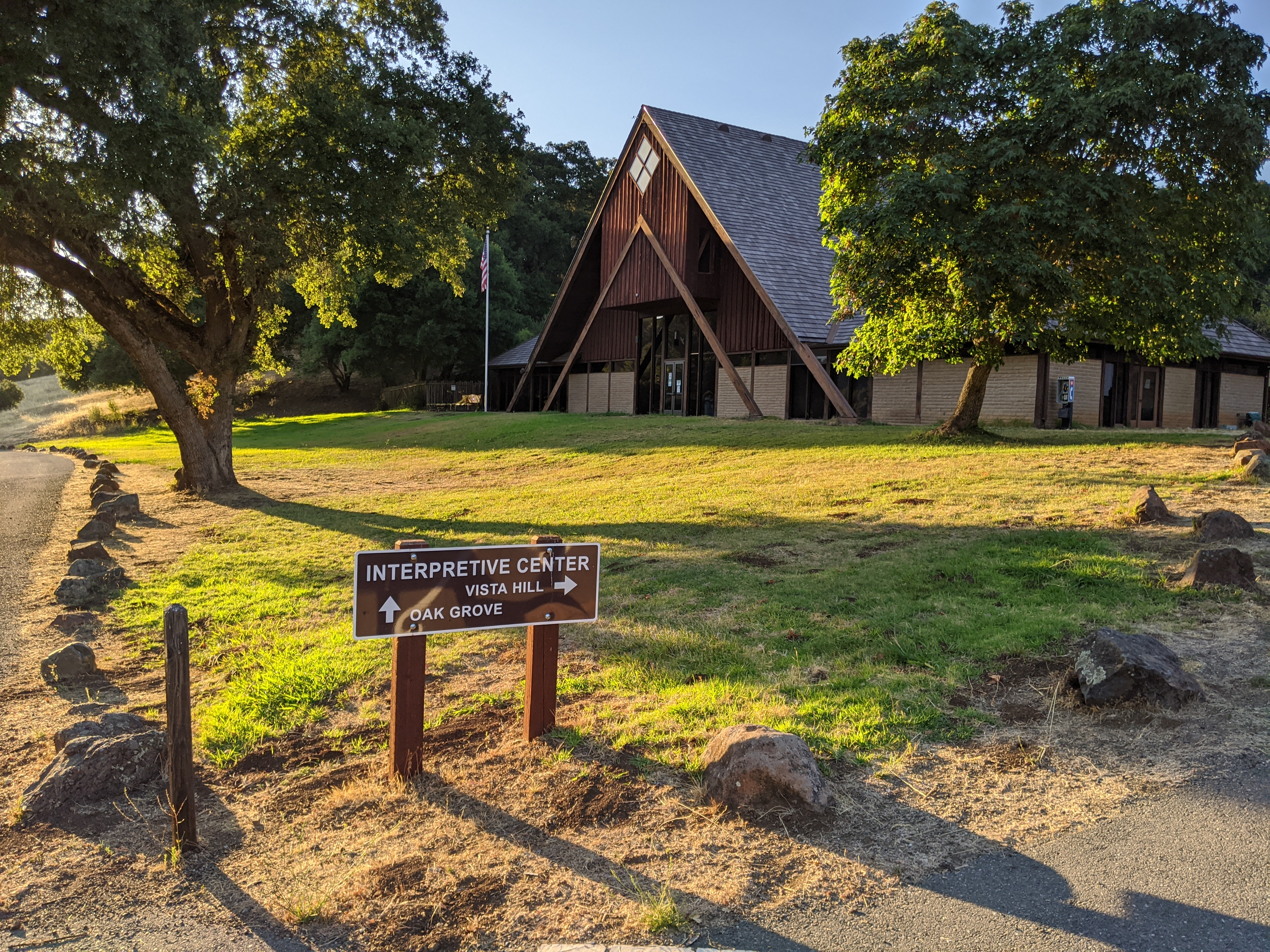
The interpretive center

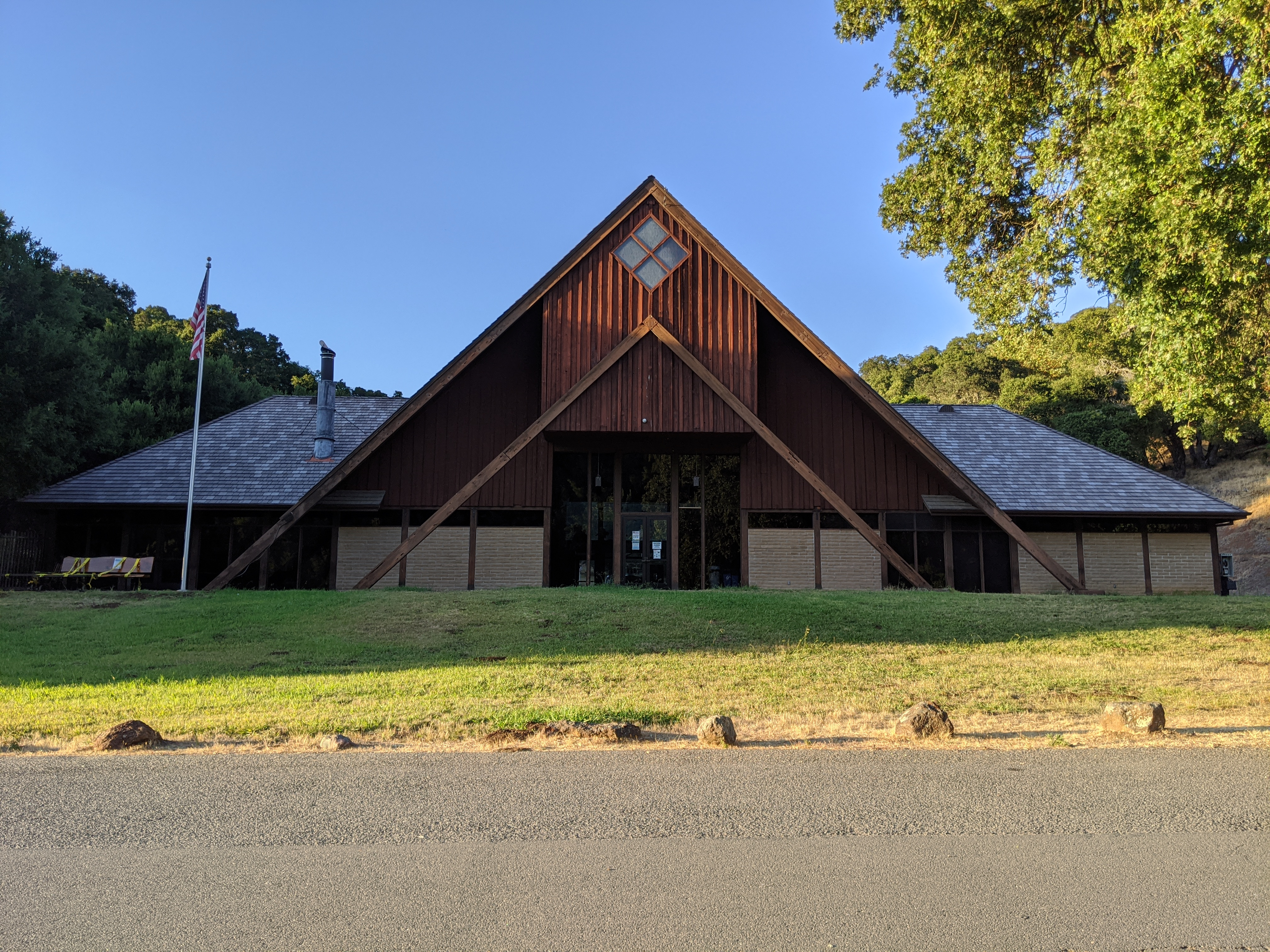
The interpretive center

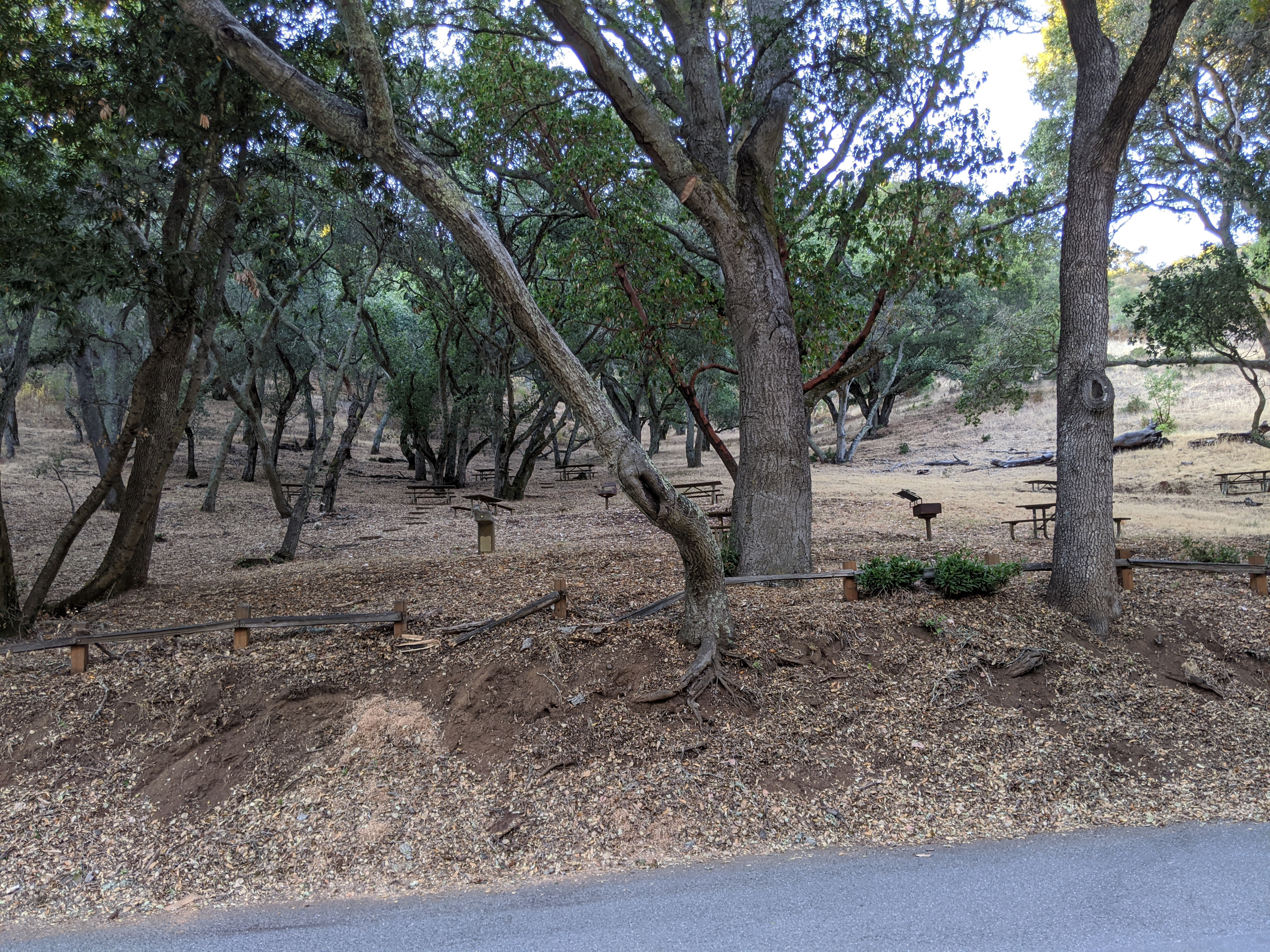
There are over fifty picnic tables in the park (Note: There are eighteen picnic tables in the Oak Grove picnic area, which requires advance reservations. There are ten picnic tables in this image, and twenty seven immediately visible in Orchard Glen, for a total of 55.)

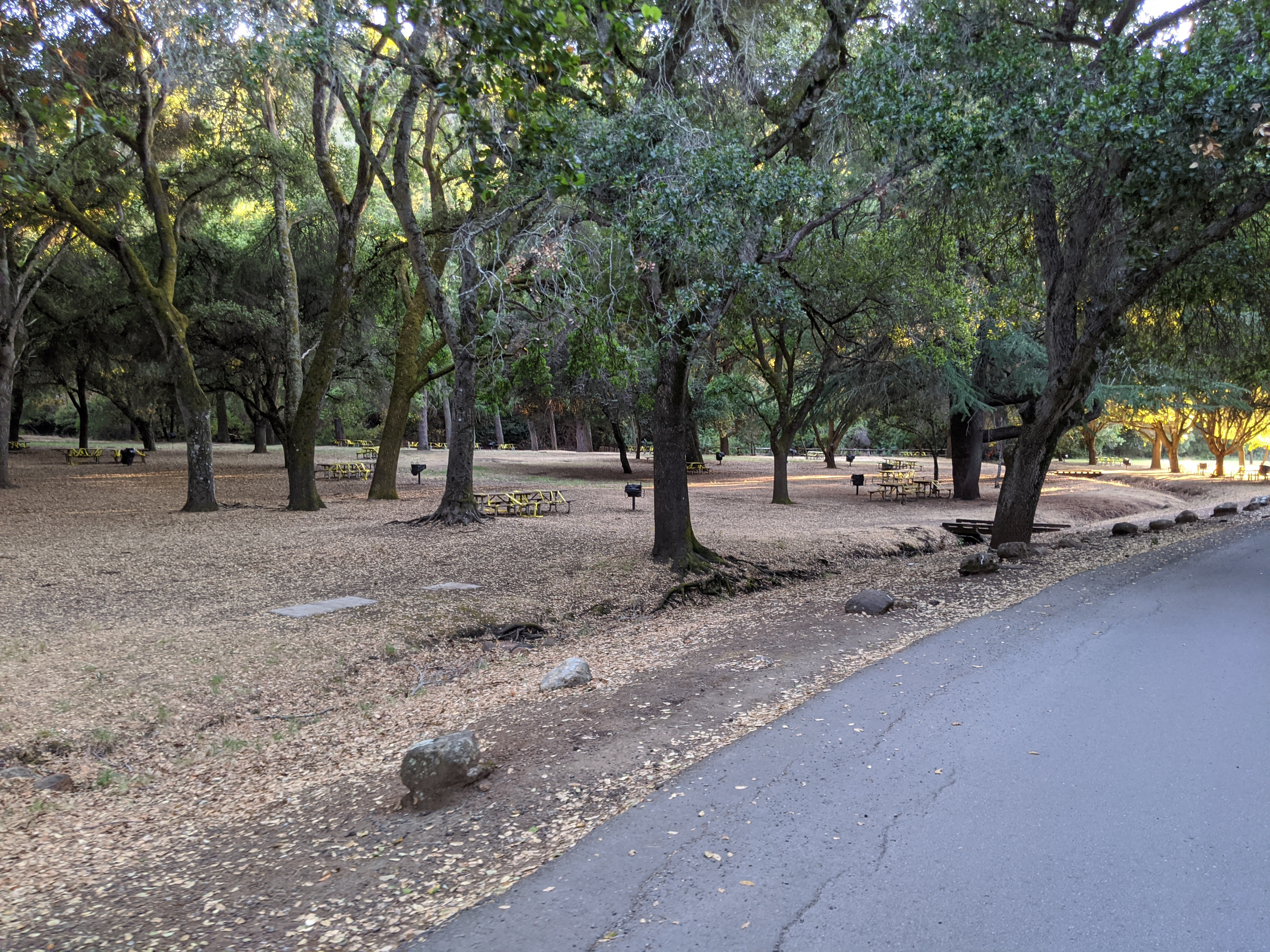
Orchard Glen (Note: The caution tape is because of COVID-19)
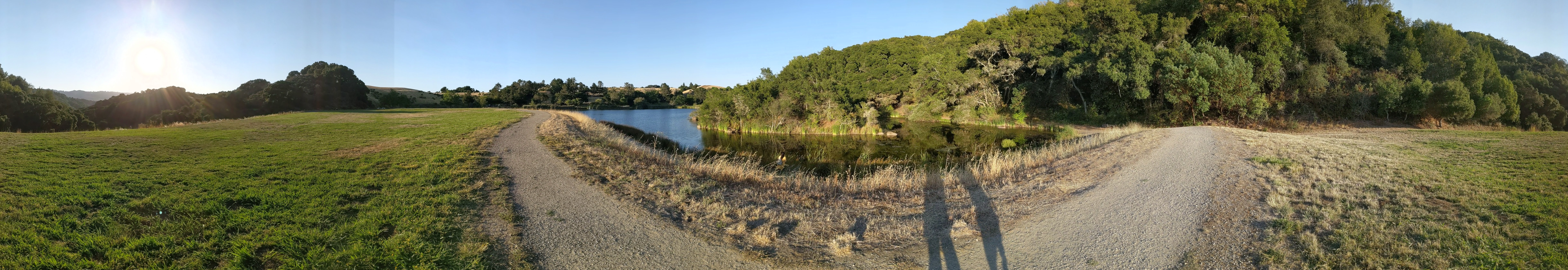
Panorama on the berm of Boronda Lake
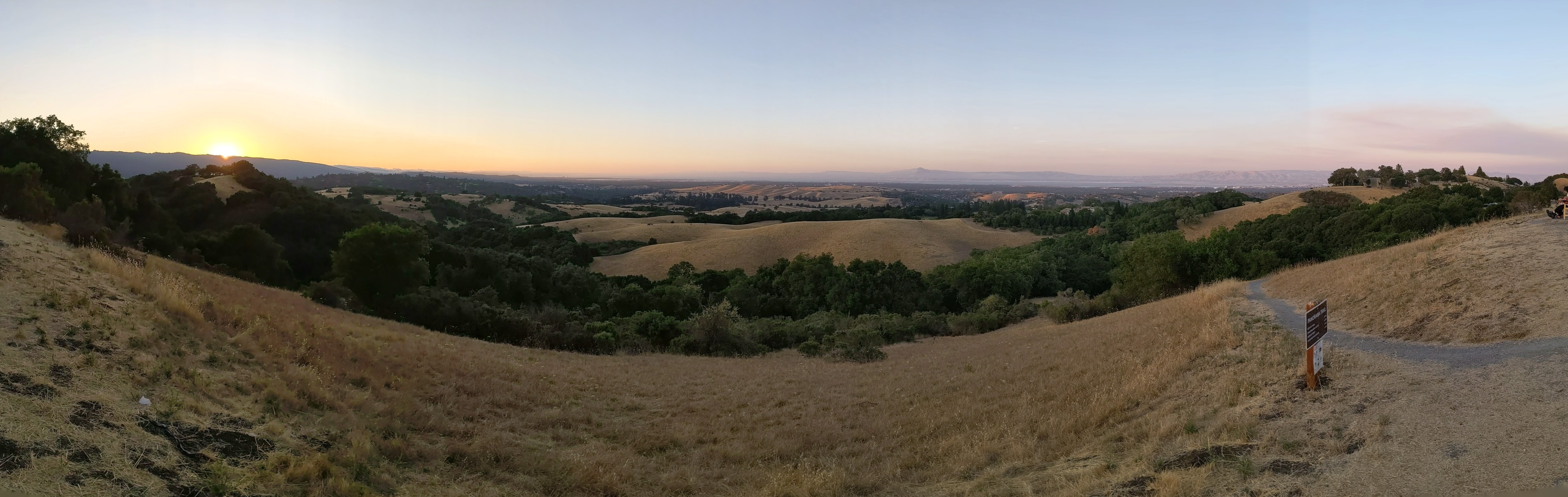
Panorama from the Vista Point
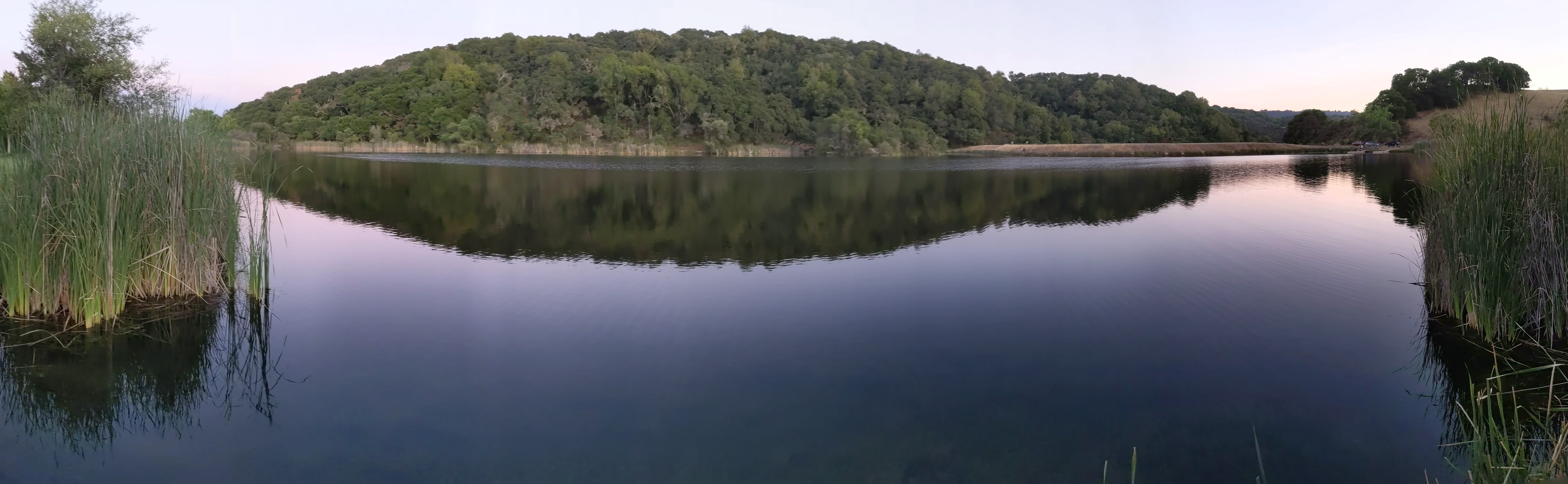
Panorama of Boronda Lake
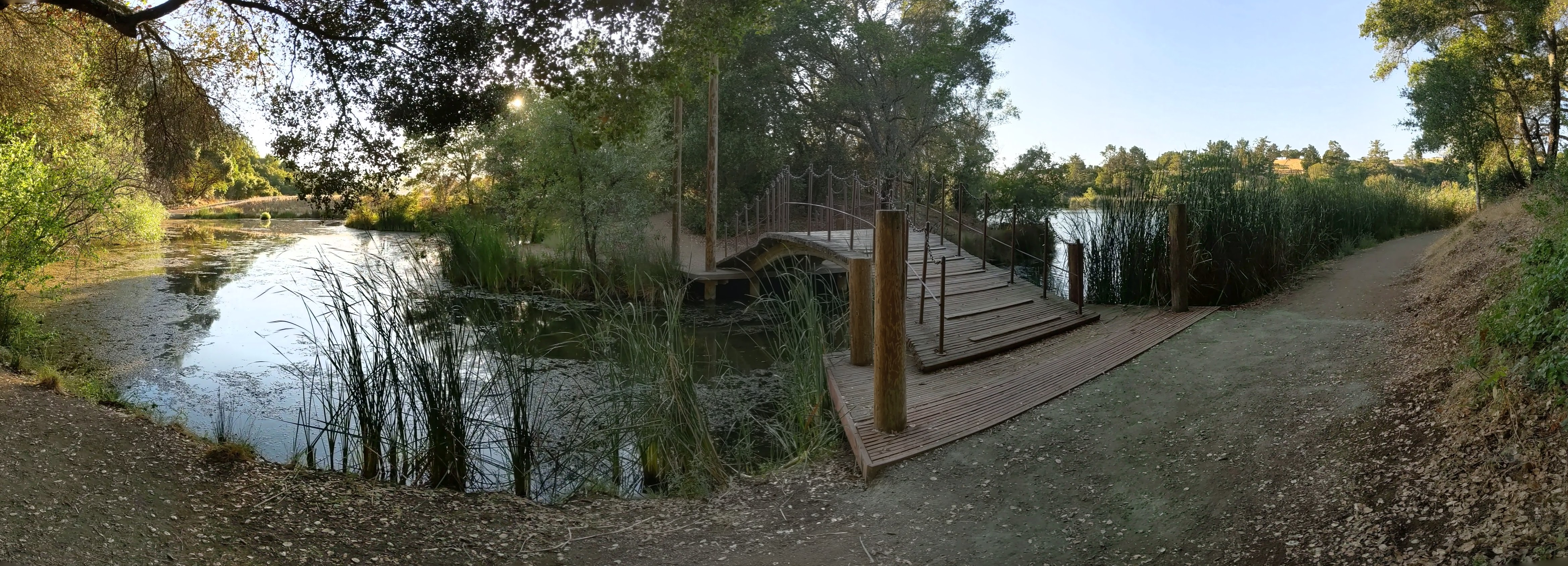
The bridge to Monkey Island on Boronda Lake

== Camping ==
Towle Campground at Foothills Park has eight tent only campsites, they are open May 1st through October 31st, each site has a picnic table, barbeque, food locker and water. The campground has two campfire circles and portable toilet facilities shared between the sites, with full use facilities a mile down the road.
