= Dyche =

Dyche is a surname. Notable people with the surname include:

- Lewis Lindsay Dyche (1857–1915), American naturalist
- Max Dyche (born 2003), English footballer
- Mick Dyche (1951–2018), English guitarist
- Schubert R. Dyche (1893–1982), American football and basketball coach
- Sean Dyche (born 1971), English footballer and manager
- Thomas Dyche (died 1733), English lexicographer
