= Stanford Dish (Stanford Radio Telescope) =

Radio telescope in California

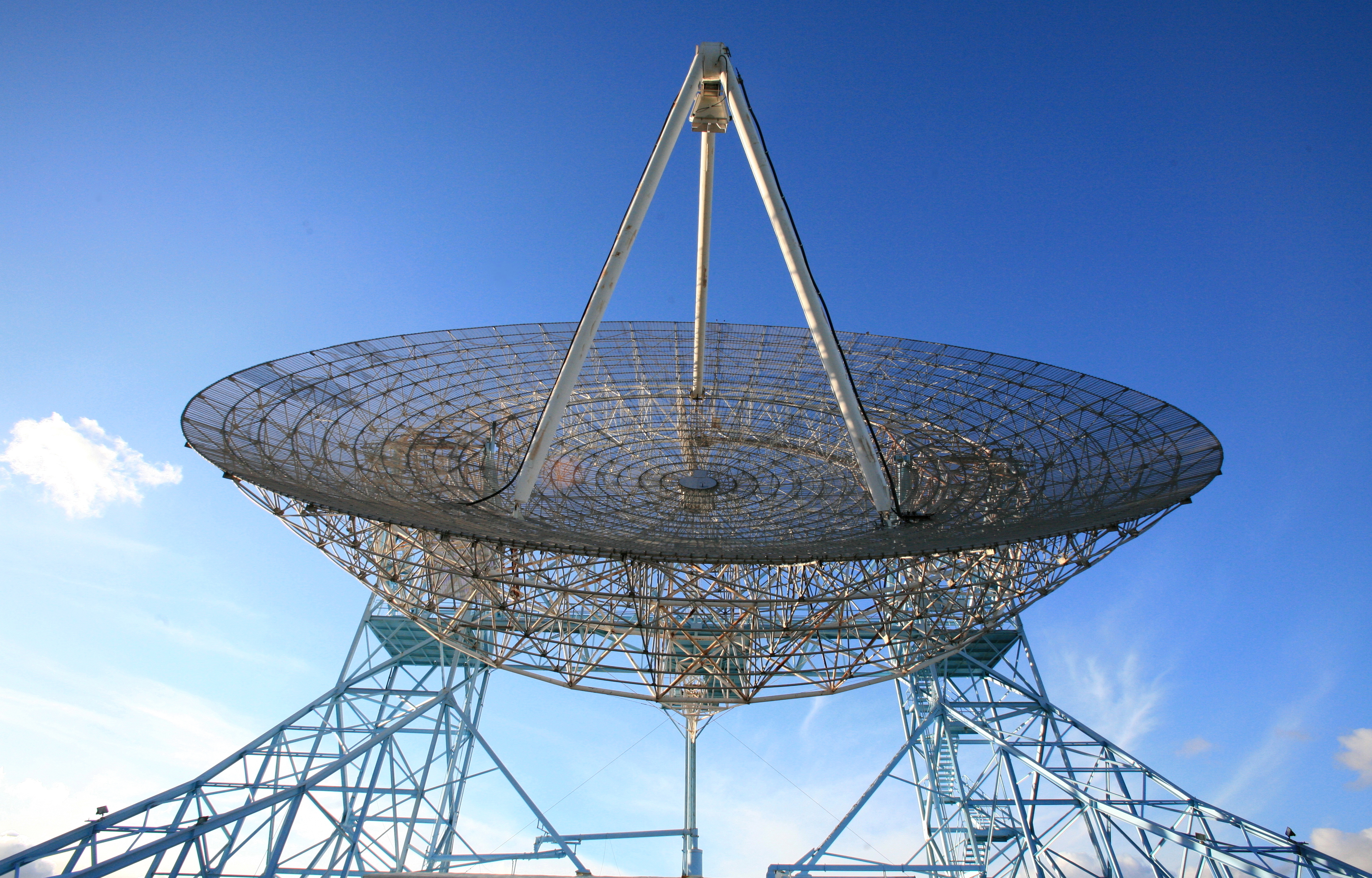
- Alternative names: The Dish
- Location: California, Pacific States Region
- Coordinates: 37°24′30″N 122°10′44″W
- Diameter: 150 ft (46 m)
- Website: dish.stanford.edu
- Location within the United States
- Related media on Commons

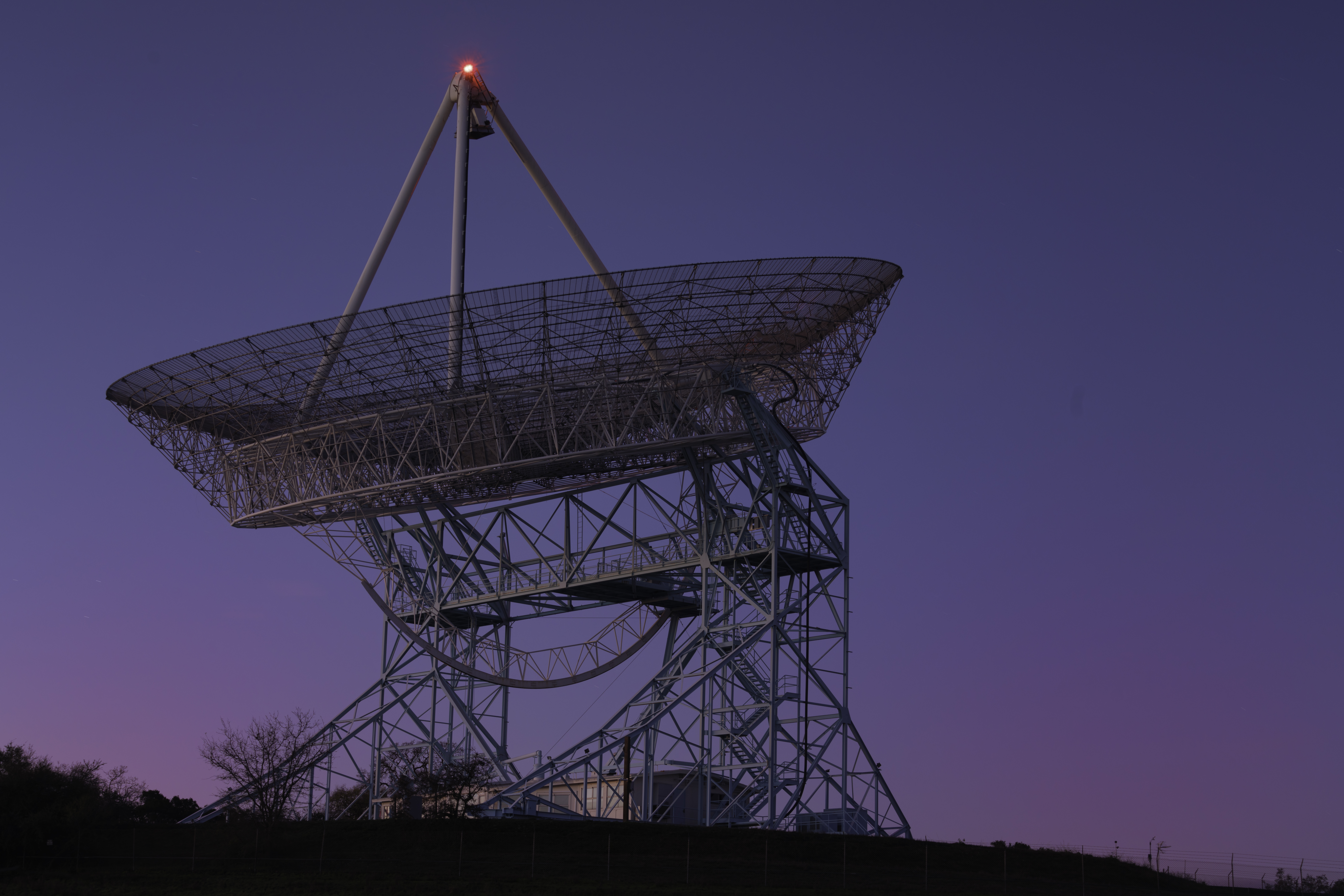
The Stanford Dish in the early morning hours

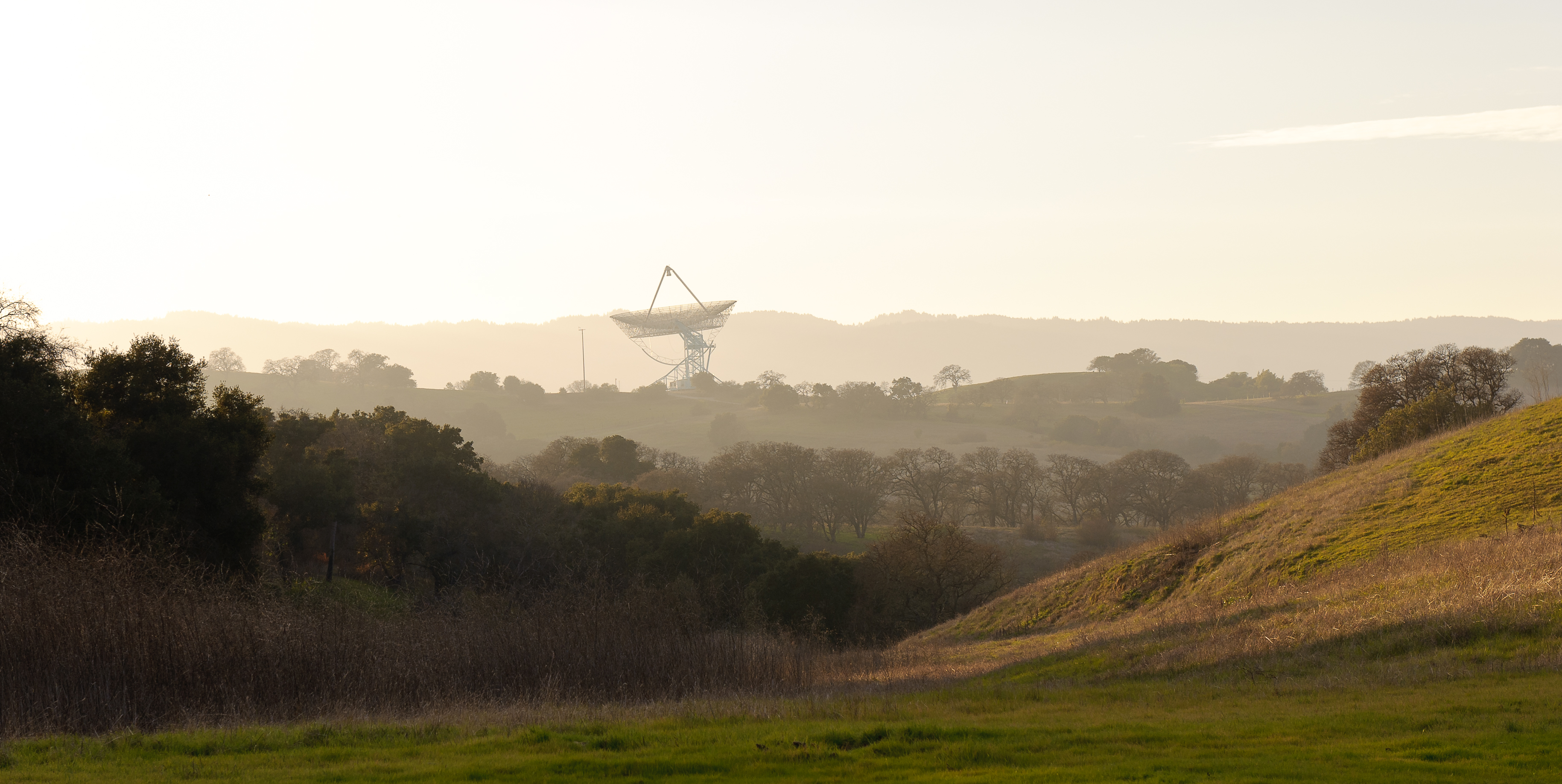
The Dish in the Stanford foothills

The Stanford Dish, known locally as the Dish, is a steerable radio antenna in the Stanford, California foothills. "The Dish" is also used locally to refer to the surrounding hiking area.

The 150-foot-diameter (46 m) Dish was built in 1961 by the Stanford Research Institute (now SRI International). The cost to construct the antenna was $4.5 million, funded by the United States Air Force. In the 1960s, the Dish was used to provide information on Soviet radar installations by detecting radio signals bounced off the moon.

Subsequently, the Dish was used to communicate with satellites and spacecraft. With its unique bistatic range radio communications, whereby the transmitter and receiver are separate units, the powerful radar antenna was suitable for communicating with spacecraft in regions where conventional radio signals may be disrupted.

At one point, the Dish transmitted signals to each of the Voyager craft that NASA dispatched into the outer reaches of the Solar System. In 1982 it was used to rescue the amateur radio satellite UoSAT-1.

== Later uses ==
As of 2018, the Dish is still actively used for academic and research purposes. It is owned by the U.S. Government and operated by SRI International. It is used for commanding and calibrating spacecraft and for radio astronomy measurements.

== Recreational route ==
The area around the Dish offers a popular 3.5 mile recreational trail, visited by an average of 1,500–1,800 people daily. The trail around the dish is known for its rolling hills and beautiful views, which on a clear day extend to San Jose, San Francisco, and the East Bay. The Stanford Running Club hosts an annual Dish Race and fun run that forms a 3.25 mile loop around the Dish trail.

While hikers, walkers, and runners are welcome, bicycles and dogs are not allowed on the trail. It is open during daylight hours:

	Jan	Feb	Mar	Apr	May	Jun	Jul	Aug	Sep	Oct	Nov	Dec
opens (AM)	6:30	6:30	6:00	6:00	6:00	6:00	6:00	6:00	6:30	6:30	6:30	6:30
closes (PM)	5:00	5:30	6:30	7:30	7:30	7:30	7:30	7:30	7:00	6:00	5:00	5:00

As of June 2018, 360 cows were grazing on the grounds of the Stanford Dish. Stanford leases the land to farmers who own the cows.

== See also ==
- Millstone Hill – a similar SRI-built antenna in Massachusetts
- Sugar Grove Station – site of a never-completed 1960s SRI project for a 600-foot steerable antenna in West Virginia
