= Eshaqabad Rural District =

Rural district in Razavi Khorasan province, Iran

Eshaqabad Rural District Persian: دهستان اسحق آباد
- Rural District
- Location within Iran
- Coordinates: 36°02′N 58°59′E
- Country: Iran
- Province: Razavi Khorasan
- County: Zeberkhan
- District: Eshaqabad
- Established: 1987
- Capital: Eshaqabad

Population (2016)
  - Total: 11,234
- Time zone: UTC+3:30 (IRST)

Eshaqabad Rural District (Persian: دهستان اسحق آباد) is in Eshaqabad District of Zeberkhan County, Razavi Khorasan province, Iran. It is administered from the city of Eshaqabad.

== Demographics ==
=== Population ===
At the time of the 2006 National Census, the rural district's population (as a part of the former Zeberkhan District in Nishapur County) was 10,110 in 2,618 households. There were 10,623 inhabitants in 3,178 households at the following census of 2011. The 2016 census measured the population of the rural district as 11,234 in 3,437 households. The most populous of its 67 villages was Eshaqabad (now a city), with 417 people.

In 2020, the district was separated from the county in the establishment of Zeberkhan County, and the rural district was transferred to the new Eshaqabad District.

=== Other villages in the rural district ===
- Ahovan
- Dastjerd-e Aqa Bozorg
- Fathabad
- Kalateh-ye Hajji Jahan Beyk
- Yusefabad
