= Eshaqabad District =

District in Razavi Khorasan province, Iran

Eshaqabad District Persian: بخش اسحاق‌آباد
- District
- Location within Iran
- Coordinates: 35°58′N 59°03′E
- Country: Iran
- Province: Razavi Khorasan
- County: Zeberkhan
- Established: 2020
- Capital: Eshaqabad
- Time zone: UTC+3:30 (IRST)

Eshaqabad District (Persian: بخش اسحاق‌آباد) is in Zeberkhan County, Razavi Khorasan province, Iran. Its capital is the city of Eshaqabad, whose population at the time of the 2016 National Census was 4,288 in 1,312 households.

== History ==
In 2020, Zeberkhan District was separated from Nishapur County in the establishment of Zeberkhan County, which was divided into two districts of two rural districts each, with Qadamgah as its capital. The village of Eshaqabad was converted to a city in 2021.

== Demographics ==
=== Administrative divisions ===
Eshaqabad District
Administrative Divisions
Eshaqabad RD
Heshmatiyeh RD
Eshaqabad (city) (Note: Became a city after the 2016 census)
RD = Rural District
