= Kashmar =

City in Razavi Khorasan province, Iran

Kashmar کاشمر (Persian)
- City
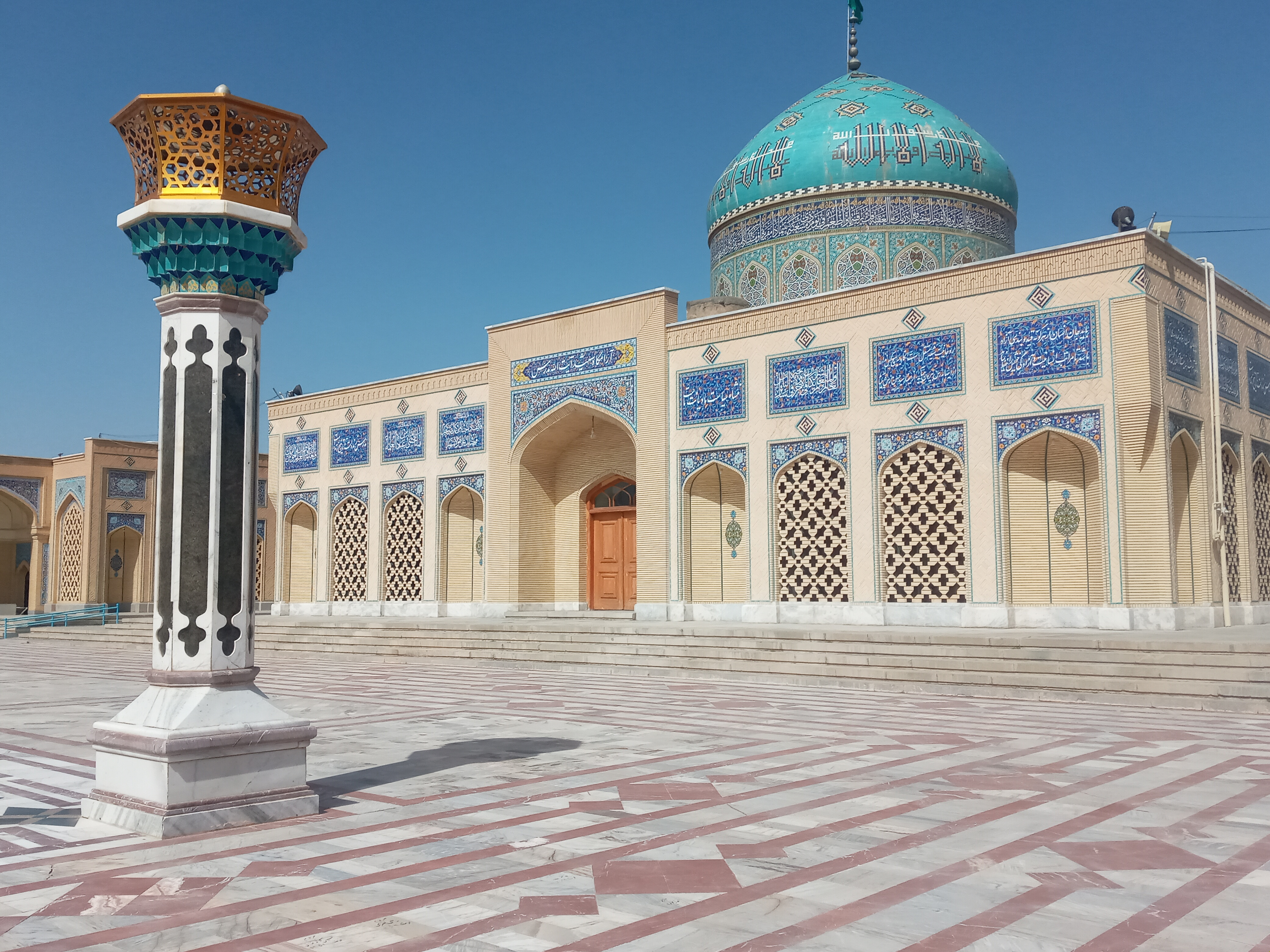
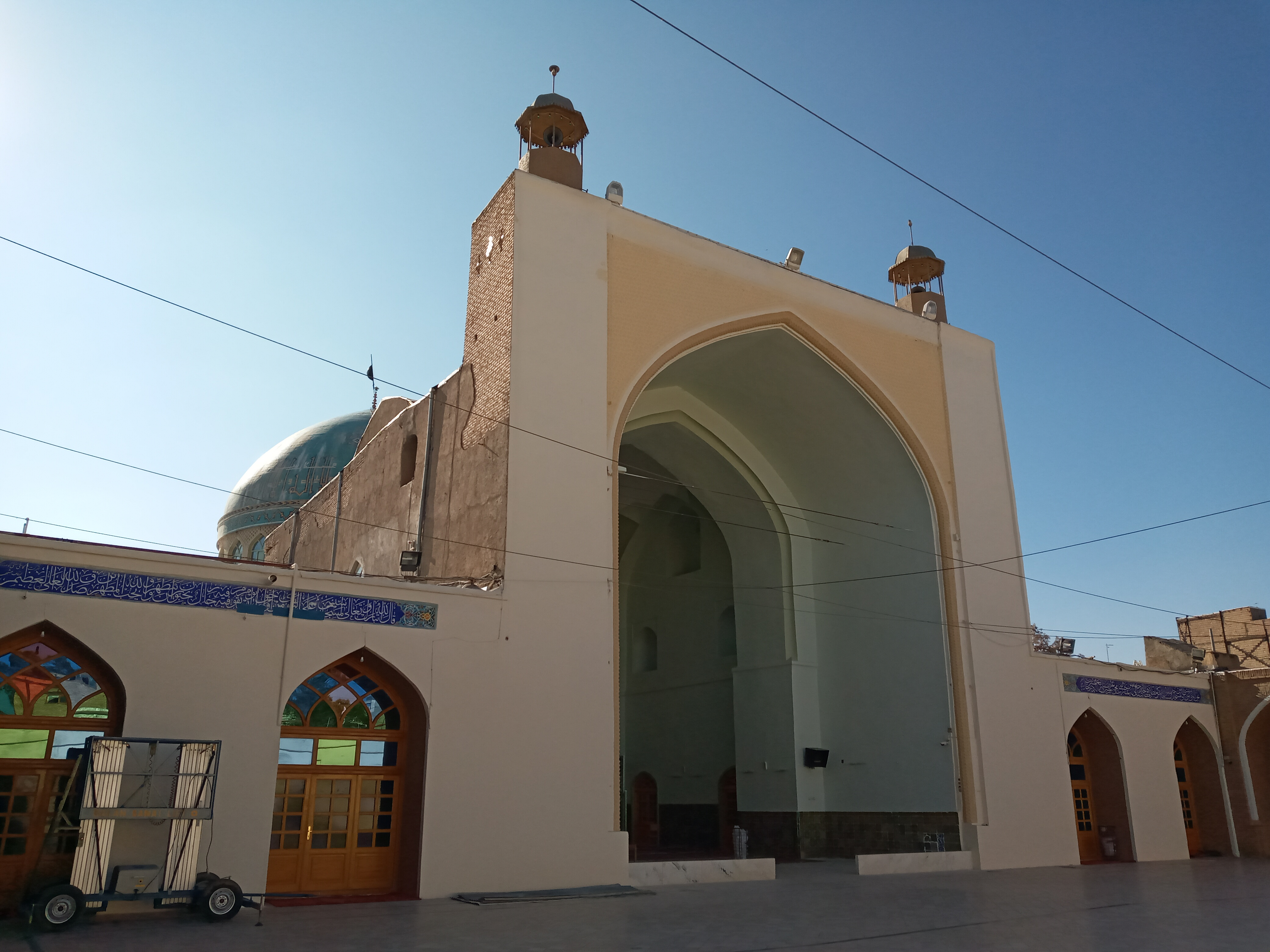
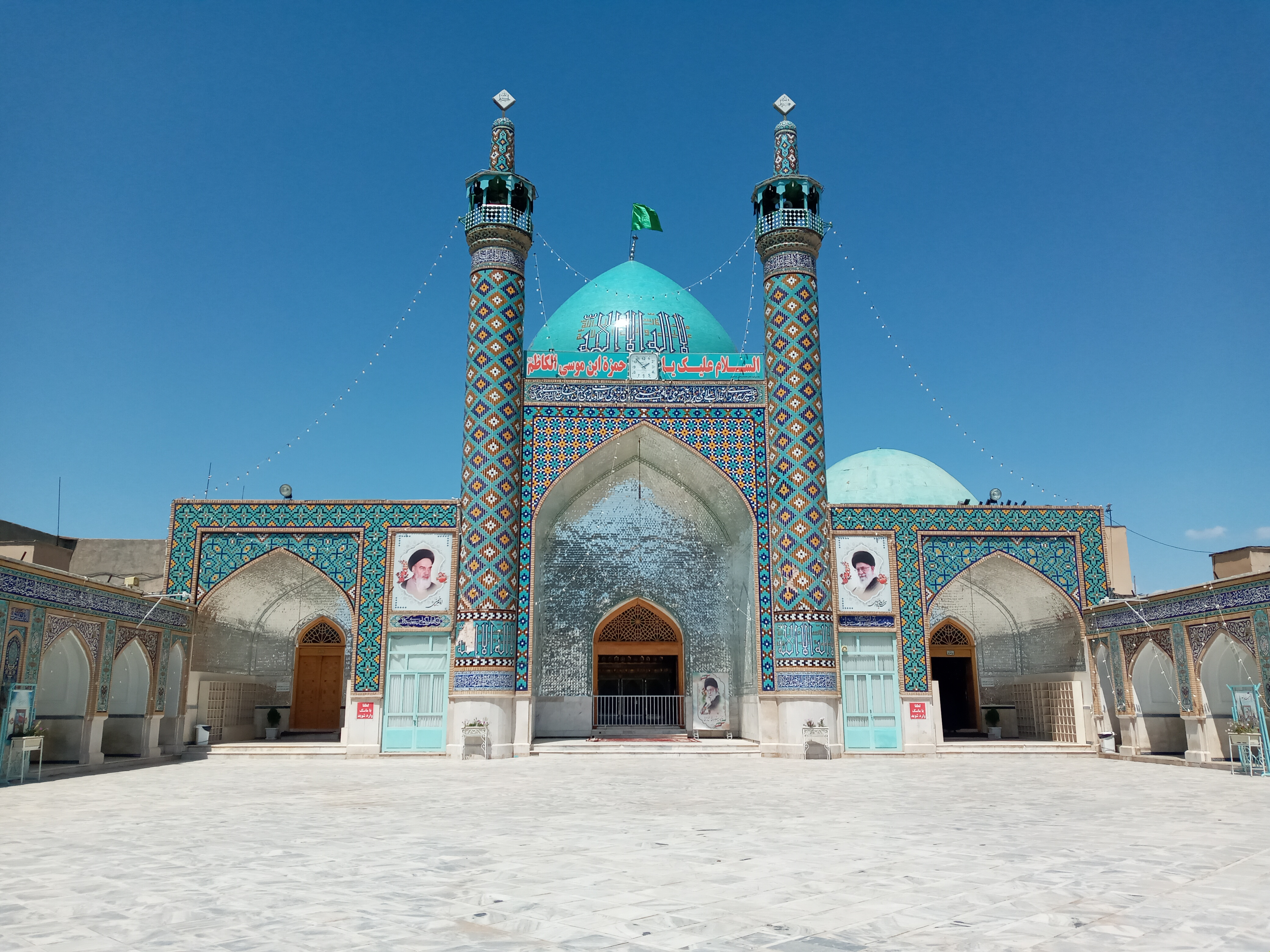
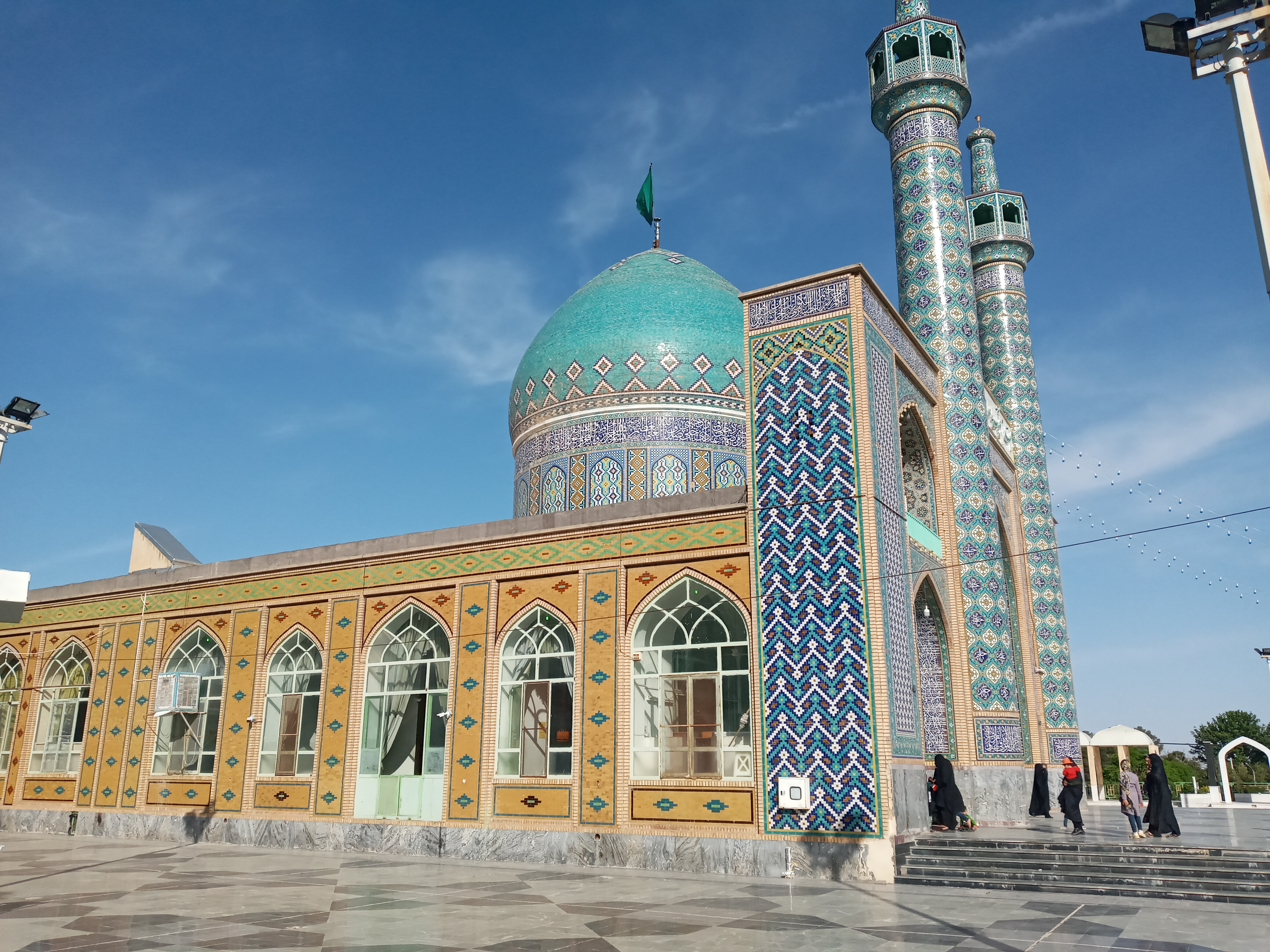
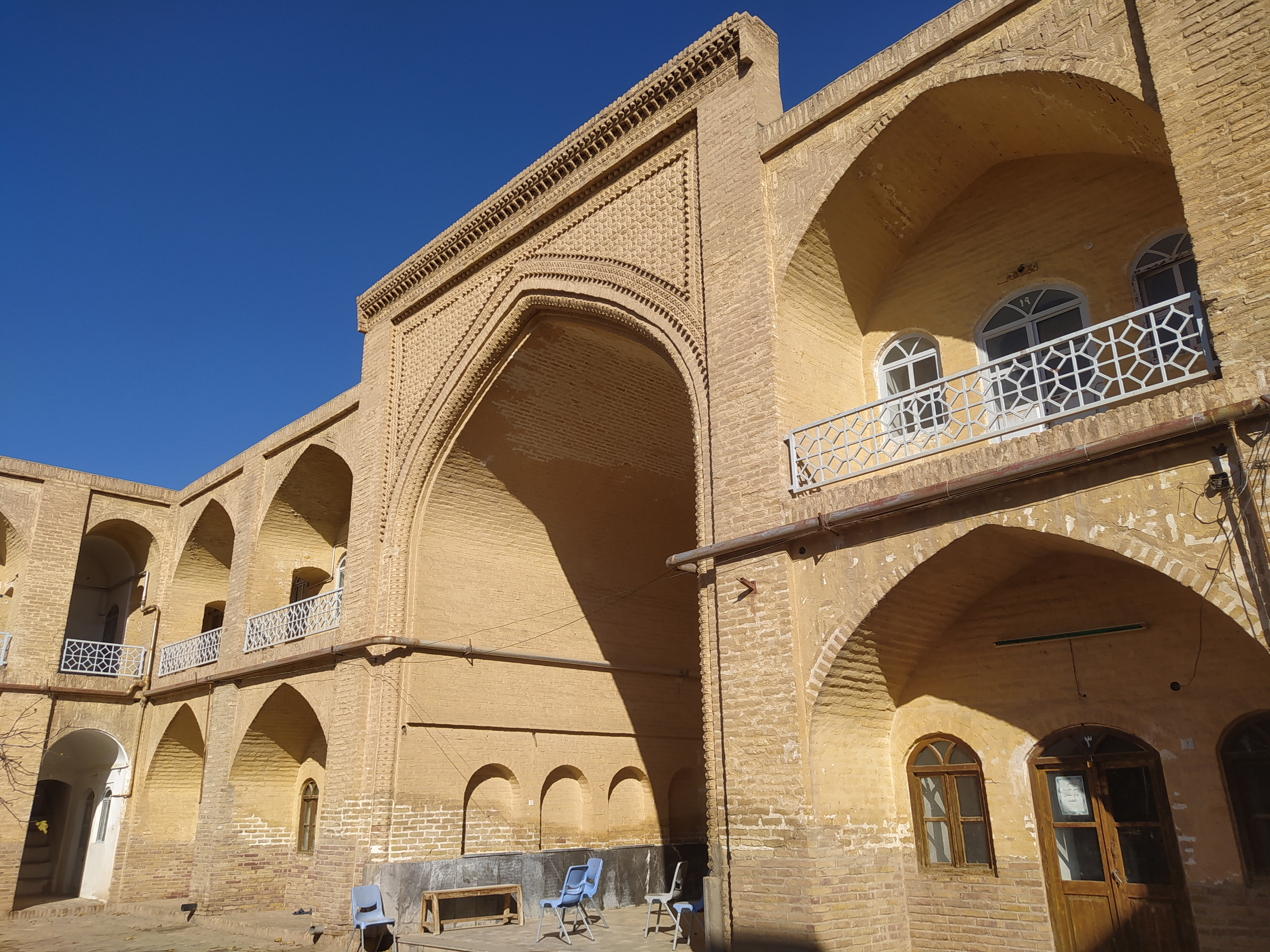
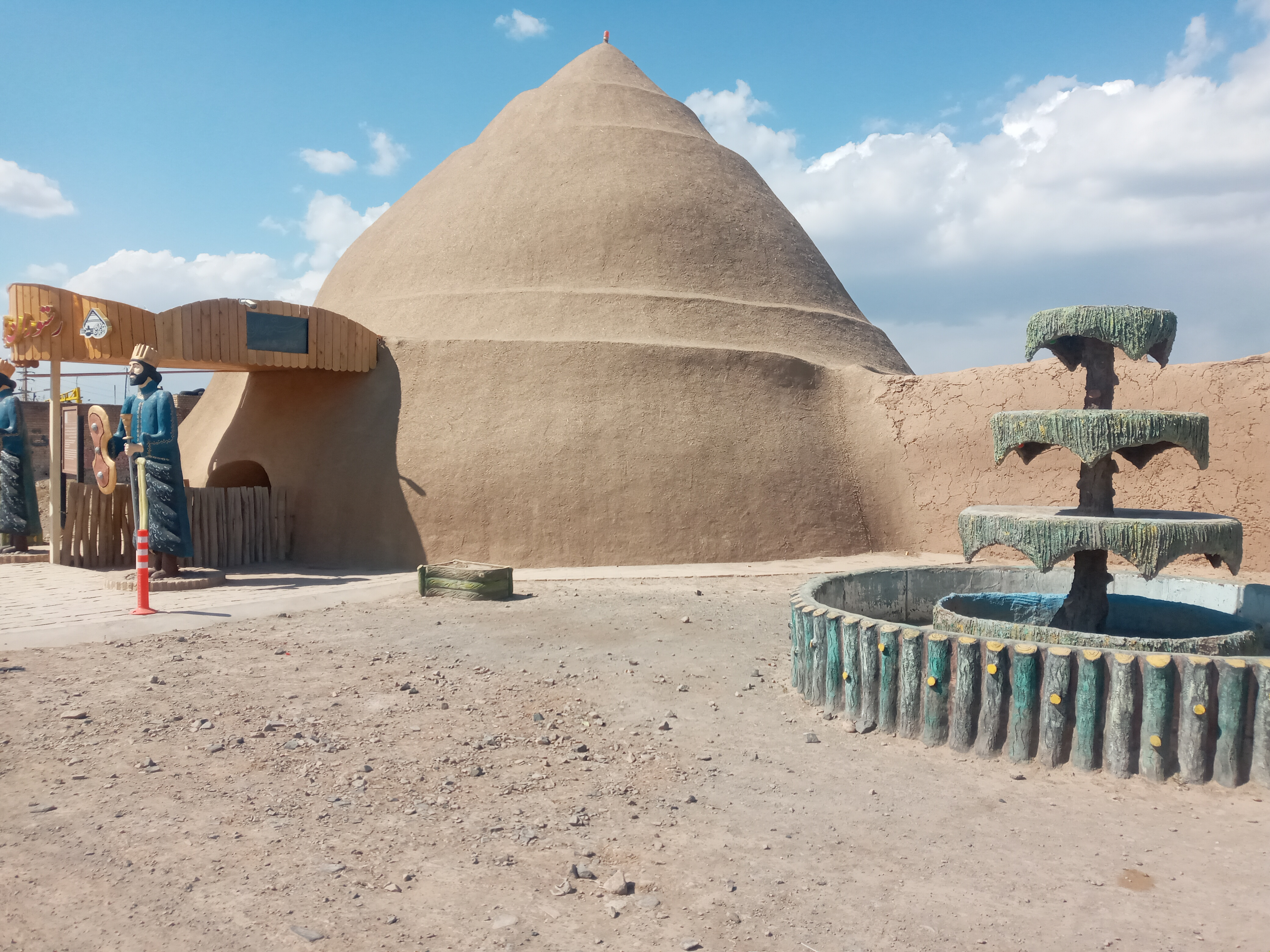
- From top: Tomb of Hassan Modarres, Jameh Mosque of Kashmar, Haji Jalal Mosque, Imamzadeh Hamzeh, Imamzadeh Seyed Morteza, Haj Soltan Madrasa, Yakhchāl of Kashmar, Atashgah Castle.

- Location of Kashmar County in Razavi Khorasan province (center left, yellow)

- Location within Iran Location within West and Central Asia
- Coordinates: 35°14′41″N 58°27′39″E
- Country: Iran
- Province: Razavi Khorasan
- County: Kashmar
- District: Central
- Elevation: 1,063 m (3,488 ft)

Population (2016 Census)
  - Urban: 102,282
- Time zone: UTC+3:30 (IRST)
- Area code: (+98) 051 552

Kashmar (/kæʃˈmɑːr/; Persian: کاشمر [kʰɒːʃˈmæɹ]) (Note: Also romanized as Kāshmar; formerly Keshmar (کشمر), Soltanabad (سلطان‌آباد), and Torshīz (ترشیز)) is a city in the Central District of Kashmar County, Razavi Khorasan province, Iran, serving as capital of both the county and the district. Kashmar is near the river Shesh Taraz in the western part of the province, and south of the province's capital Mashhad, in Iran, from east to Bardaskan, west to Torbat-e Heydarieh, north to Nishapur, south to Gonabad. Until two centuries ago, this city was named Torshiz (ترشیز).

== Demographics ==
=== Population ===
At the time of the 2006 National Census, the city's population was 81,527 in 21,947 households. The following census in 2011 counted 90,200 people in 26,445 households. The 2016 census measured the population of the city as 102,282 people in 31,775 households.

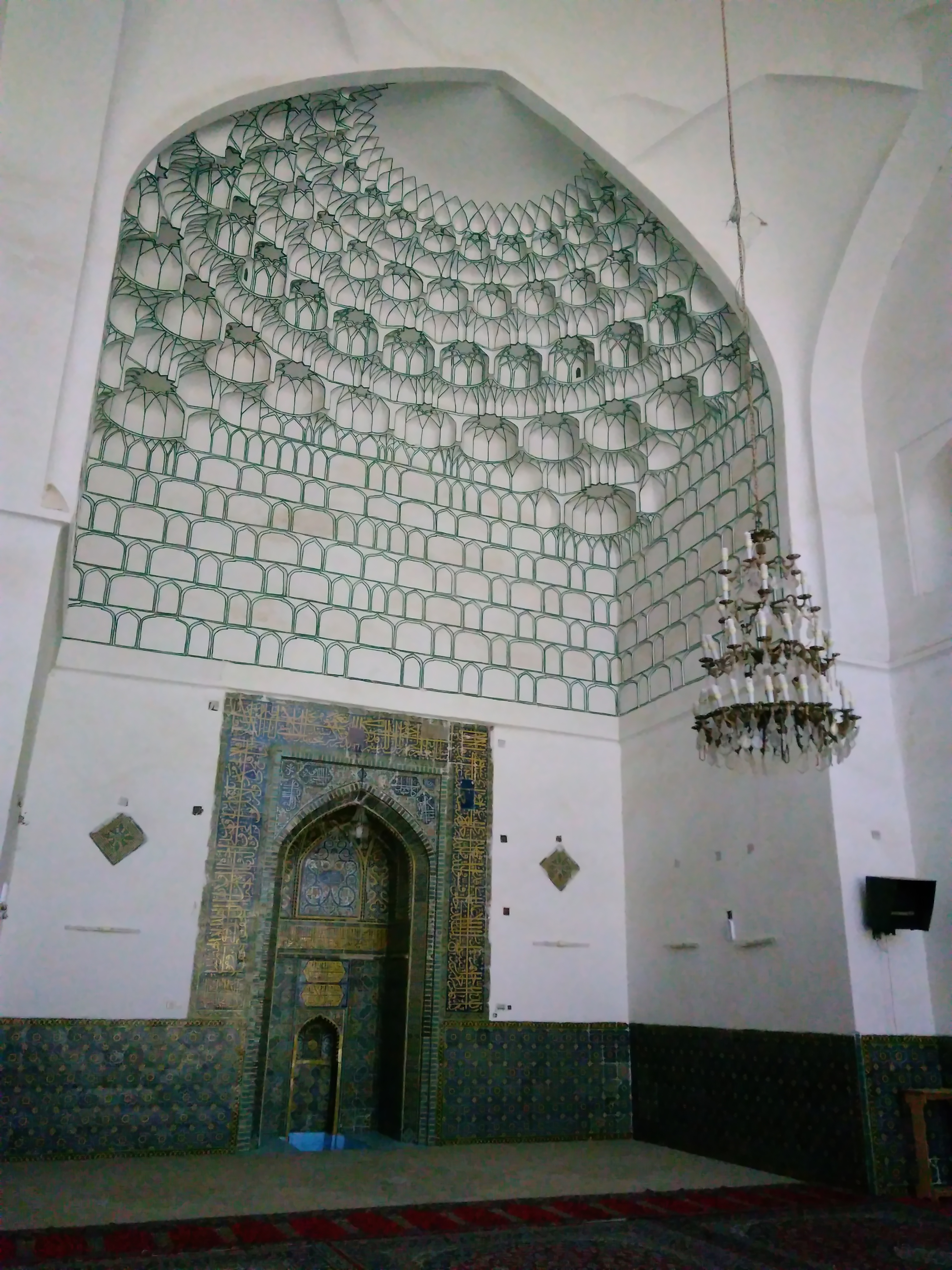
Jameh Mosque of Kashmar related to 1791 during the reign of Fath-Ali Shah Qajar

== Historical legends ==
Kashmar is a city with an ancient history and many legendary stories. Among the historical legends are about the Cypress of Kashmar.

=== Cypress of Kashmar ===
The Cypress of Kashmar is a mythical cypress tree of legendary beauty and gargantuan dimensions. It is said to have sprung from a branch brought by Zoroaster from Paradise and to have stood in today's Kashmar in northeastern Iran and to have been planted by Zoroaster in honor of the conversion of King Vishtaspa to Zoroastrianism. According to the Iranian physicist and historian Zakariya al-Qazwini King Vishtaspa had been a patron of Zoroaster who planted the tree himself. In his ʿAjā'ib al-makhlūqāt wa gharā'ib al-mawjūdāt, he further describes how the Al-Mutawakkil in 247 AH (861 AD) caused the mighty cypress to be felled, and then transported it across Iran, to be used for beams in his new palace at Samarra. Before, he wanted the tree to be reconstructed before his eyes. This was done in spite of protests by the Iranians, who offered a very high sum of money to save the tree. Al-Mutawakkil never saw the cypress, because he was murdered by a Turkish soldier (possibly in the employ of his son) on the night when it arrived on the banks of the Tigris.

=== Fire Temple of Kashmar ===
Kashmar Fire Temple was the first Zoroastrian fire temple built by Vishtaspa at the request of Zoroaster in Kashmar. In a part of Ferdowsi's Shahnameh, the story of finding Zarathustra and accepting Vishtaspa's religion is regulated that after accepting Zoroastrian religion, Vishtaspa sends priests all over the universe And Azar enters the fire temples (domes) and the first of them is Adur Burzen-Mihr who founded in Kashmar and planted a cypress tree in front of the fire temple and made it a symbol of accepting the Zoroastrian religion. And he sent priests all over the world, and commanded all the famous men and women to come to that place of worship.

== Religion ==
The city is fourth pilgrimage city in Iran and it is the second most pilgrimage city after Mashhad in Razavi Khorasan Province.

== Education ==
At present, Kashmar has five higher education centers, including Payame Noor University of Kashmar, Islamic Azad University of Kashmar, Jihad University of Kashmar, Kashmar Higher Education Center and the School of Nursing. According to the statistics of the above institute, 3,794,420 students are studying in the country's universities, of which about 3,500 are Kashmir students.

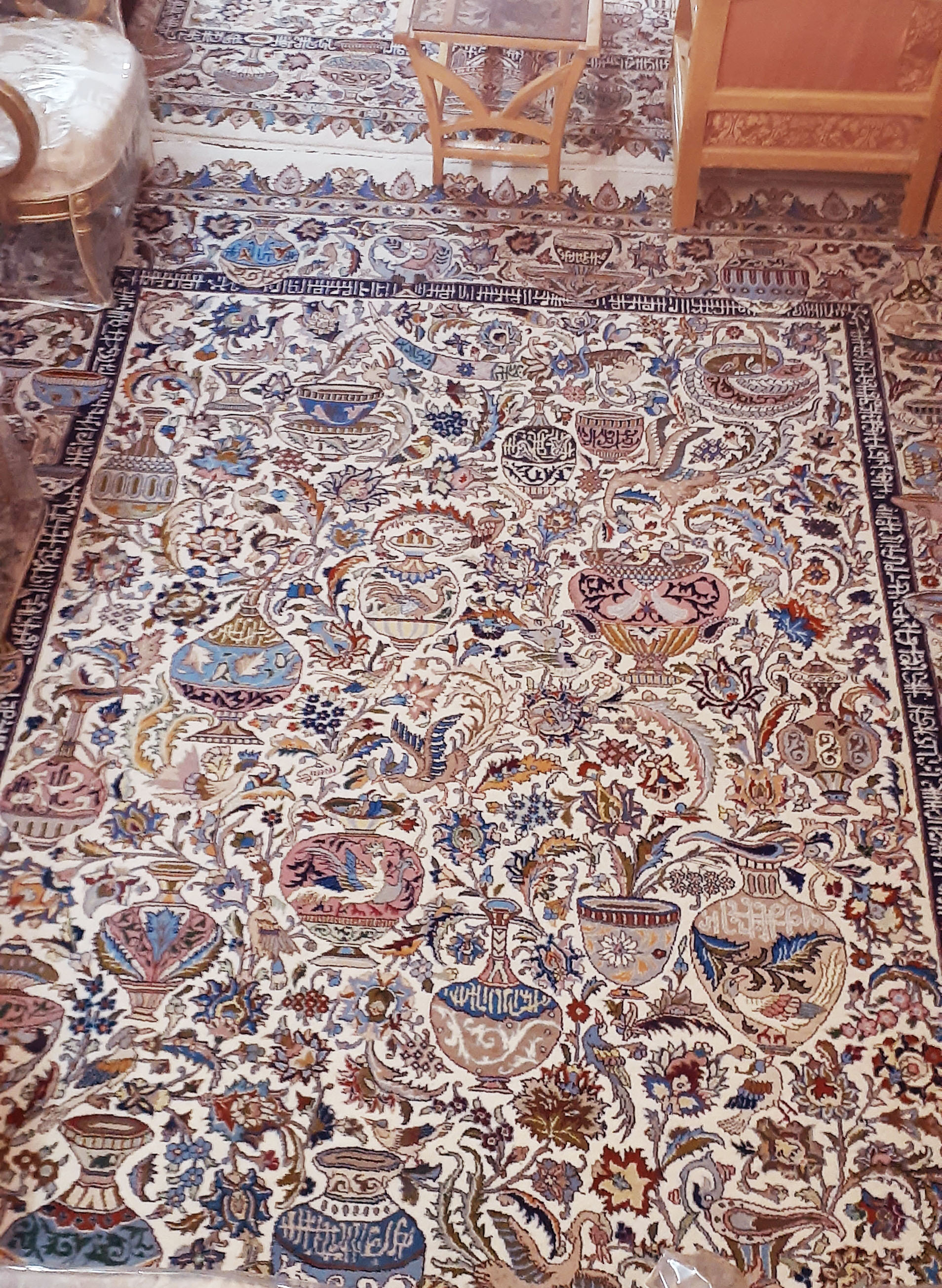
Kashmar carpet

== Souvenirs ==
The city is internationally recognized for exporting saffron and handmade Persian rugs. The main souvenirs of this city are the Kashmar carpet, raisins, grapes, saffron, dried fruits, and the confectionary sohan.

=== Kashmar carpet ===
Kashmar carpet is a regional Persian carpet named after its origin, the city of Kashmar, that is produced throughout the Kashmar County. The carpets are handmade and are often available with landscape and hunting designs. The history of carpet weaving in Kashmar dates back to 150 years and the contemporary art of carpet weaving dates back to 1920. However, between 1260 and 1280, mass production of carpets was recorded by historians. The first master weaver in the Kashmar region was Mohammad Kermani, who, despite his last name, was not from Kerman, but people say he was born in a village called Forutqeh near Kashmar. According to historians, the master weaver brought the knowledge of carpet weaving from Kerman province, and his first work was probably commissioned by Saeed Hossein Sajjadi, a native and resident of Forutqeh and a famous carpet manufacturer.

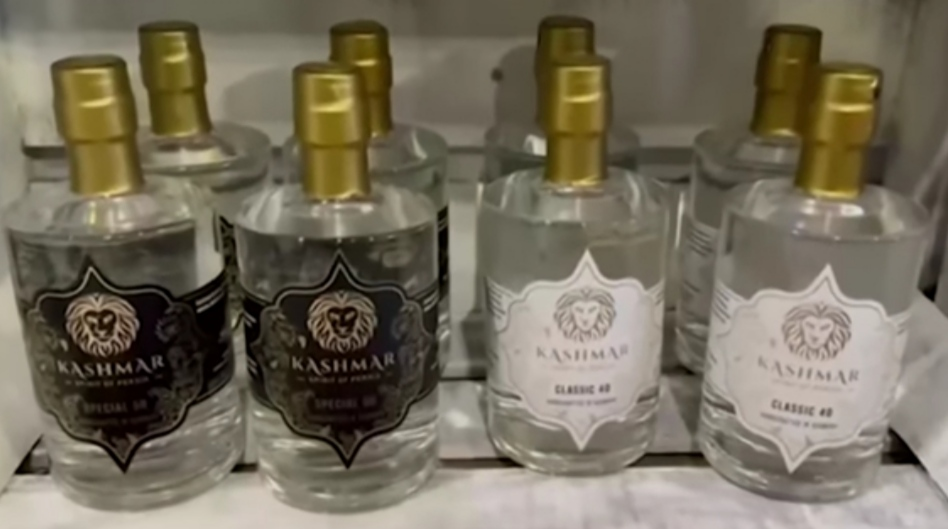
Production of Kashmar arak with the mark of lion in Germany by Alireza Afsarkhani

=== Alcoholic beverages ===
Despite the prohibition of alcohol in Iran, Kashmar is reported to have 3300 hectares of vineyards. 50% of the raisins produced in the city are exported to Europe. In Germany, a company produces its beverages with the brand "Kashmar", which is especially favoured among the Iranian diaspora in Germany. The unregulated and illegal production of alcohol within the city caused two deaths in 2018 from intoxication. in the same year, a manufactury with 300 liters alcohol was found and destroyed.

== Historical sites, ancient artifacts and tourism ==
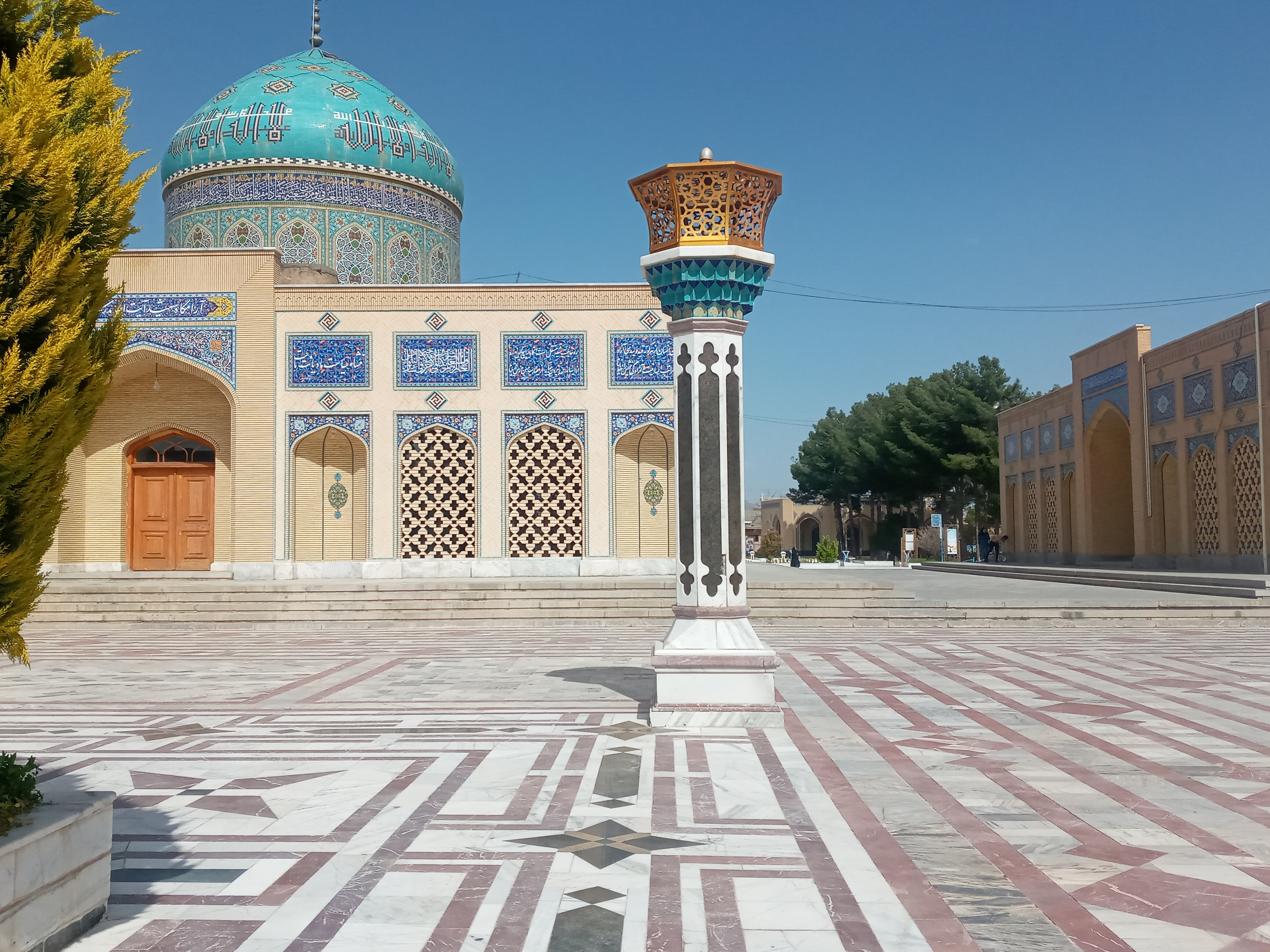
Tomb of Hassan Modarres

=== Tomb of Hassan Modarres ===
The Tomb of Sayyid Hassan Modarres is the burial site of Sayyid Hassan Modares, former Prime Minister of Iran. It was built in 1937 in Kashmar, Iran, as opposed to using the former tomb of Kashmar in the vast gardens of Kashmar. The tomb building consists of a central dome, four dock and a dome made of turquoise, in the style of Islamic architecture and the Safavid dynasty. Seyed Hassan Modares lived during the Pahlavi dynasty and was from the Sadat of Tabatabai. He was a political constitutionalist.

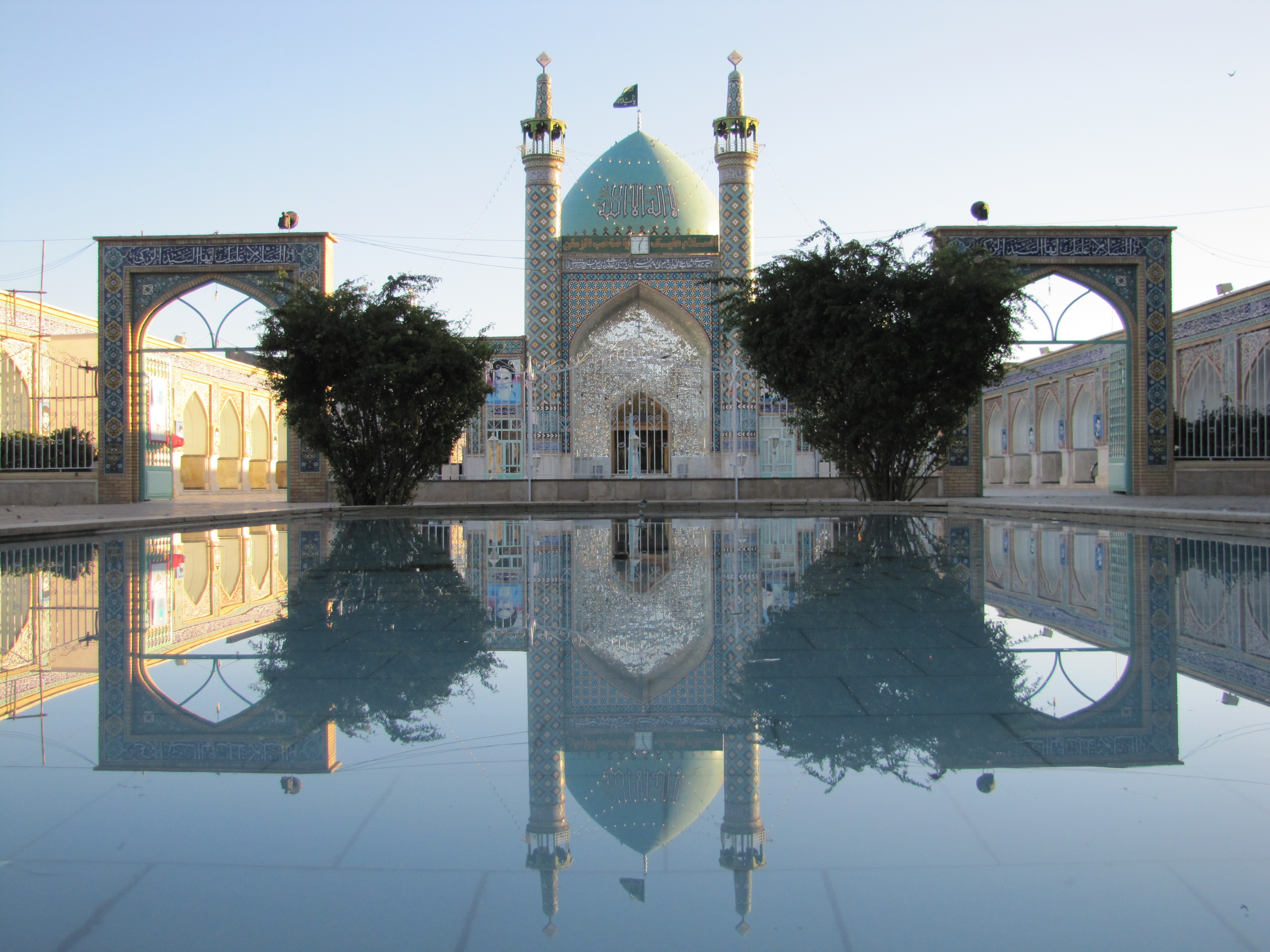
Imamzadeh Hamzeh

=== Hassan Modarres Museum ===
The Hassan Modarres Museum is a Museum belongs to the 21st century and is located in Kashmar, Razavi Khorasan Province in Iran.

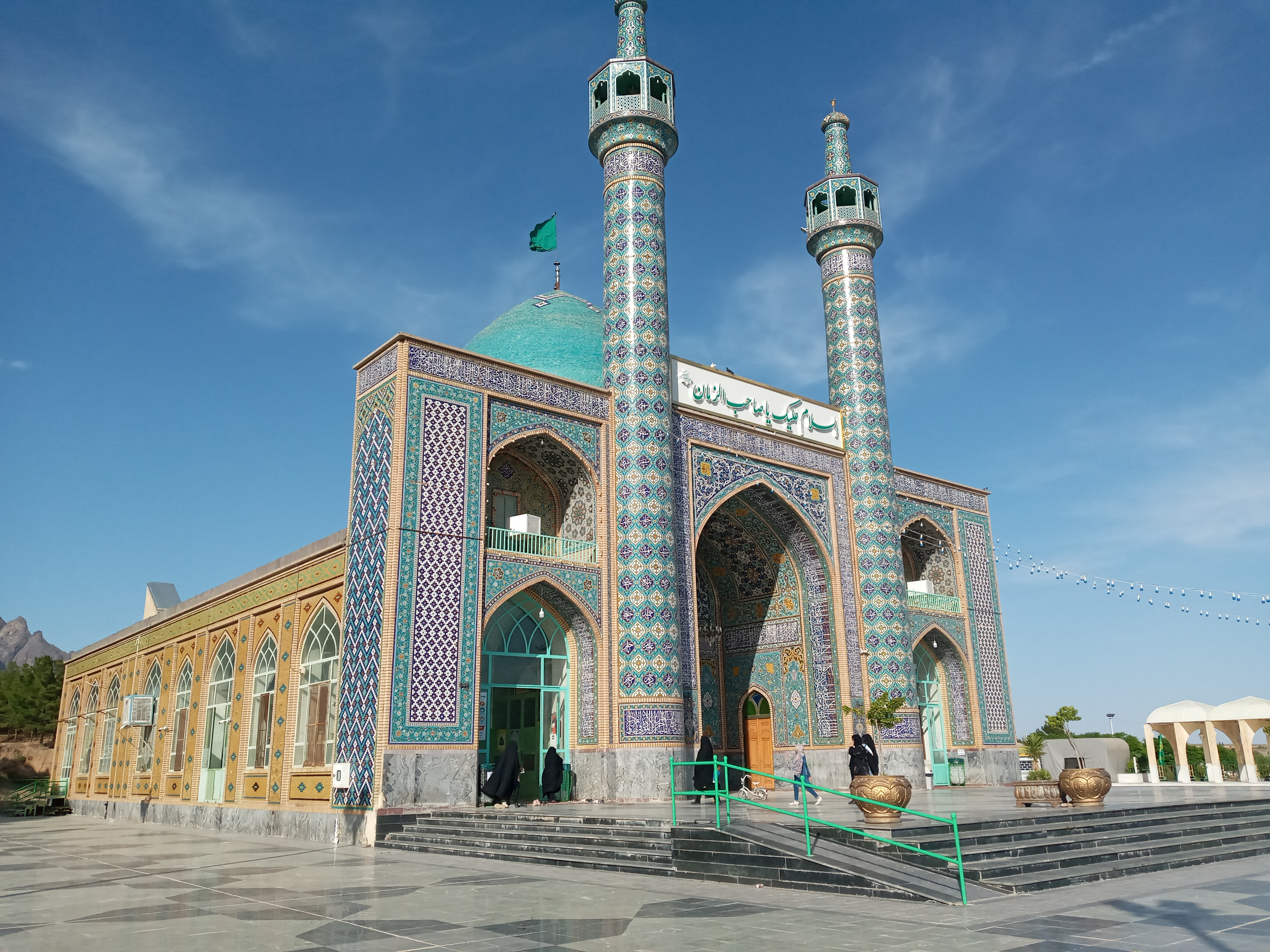
Imamzadeh Seyed Morteza

=== Imamzadeh Seyed Morteza ===
Imamzadeh Seyed Morteza is related to the Qajar dynasty and is located in Razavi Khorasan Province, Kashmar. Massive trees, waterfalls and swimming pools add to the attractions of this place, and on the other hand, a good number of living rooms provide a good base for traveling to this place, as well as the many shops and dining halls.

=== Imamzadeh Hamzeh ===
Imamzadeh Hamzah, Kashmar the oldest mosque in Kashmar, includes the tomb of Hamza al-Hamza ibn Musa al-Kadhim, the garden and the public cemetery, and is as an Imamzadeh.

=== Jameh Mosque of Kashmar ===
Jameh Mosque of Kashmar, the place where Jumu'ah is performed, was built in Kashmar in 1791 by Fath-Ali Shah Qajar. This Mosque is opposite the Amin al-tojar Caravansarai.

Haji Jalal Mosque

=== Haji Jalal Mosque ===
Haji Jalal Mosque is a Qajar dynasty period mosque in Kashmar, Razavi Khorasan Province.

=== Kohneh Castle, Zendeh Jan ===
Kohneh Castle is a Castle related to the 1st millennium and is located in the Kashmar County, Zendeh Jan village.

=== Atashgah Manmade-Cave ===
The Atashgah Manmade-Cave or Atashgah Cave is located 20 km (12 mi) northwest of Kashmar city, Iran and the cave has two entrance passages.

Atashgah Castle

=== Atashgah Castle ===
Atashgah Castle is a castle in the city of Kashmar, and is one of the attractions of Kashmar. This castle was built by the Sasanian government and it was famous in ancient times.

=== Rig Castle ===
Rig castle is a Castle related to the Seljuq dynasty and is located in the Kashmar County, Quzhd village.

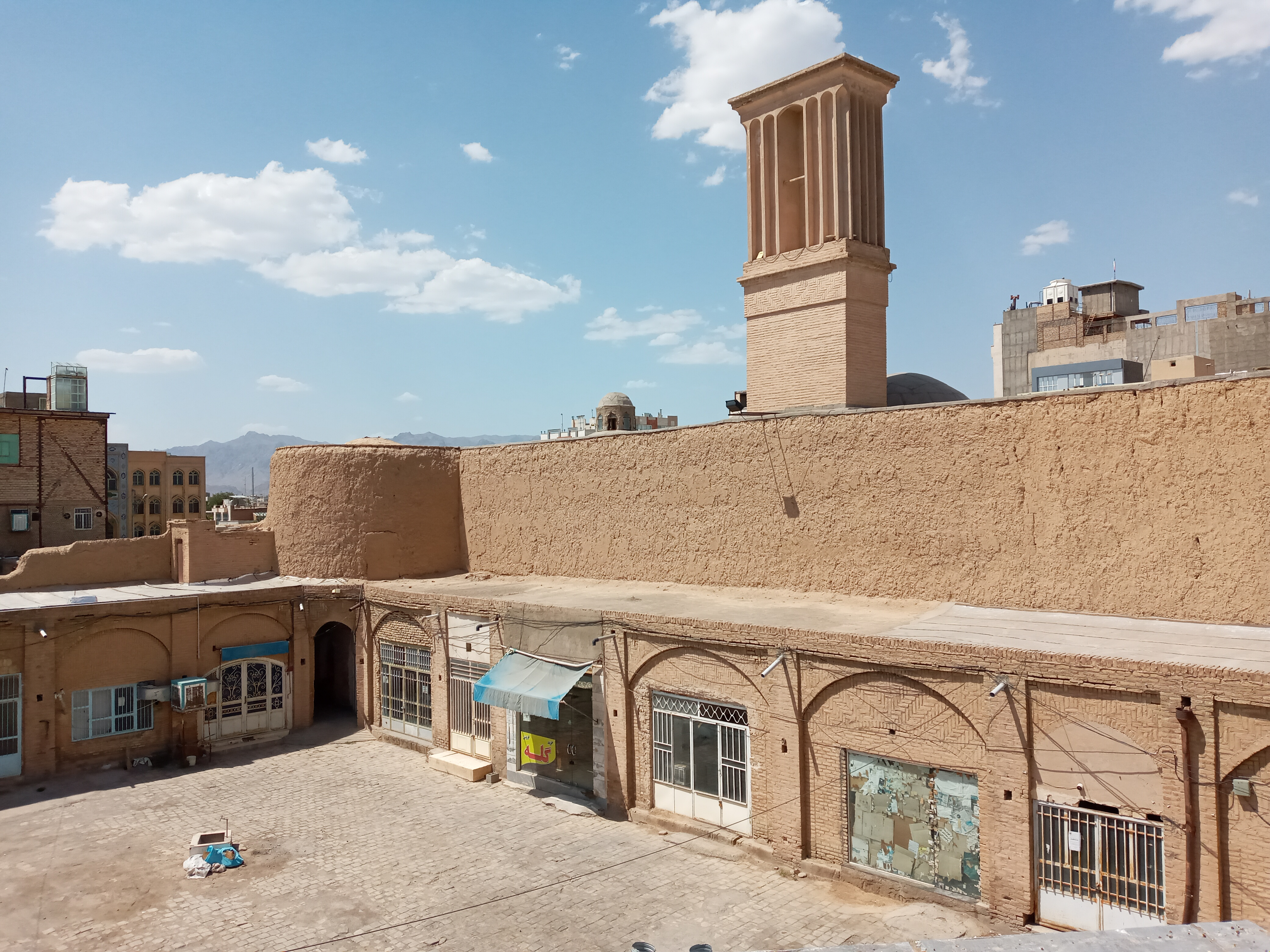
Amin al-Tojar Caravanserai

=== Amin al-tojar Caravansarai ===
Amin al-tojar Caravansarai is a caravanserai related to the Qajar dynasty and is located in Kashmar. This Caravansarai is opposite the Jameh Mosque of Kashmar.

=== Haj Soltan Religious School ===
This school is one of the buildings of the Qajar era, which has a central courtyard and is surrounded on four sides by two-story rooms and two north and south porches.

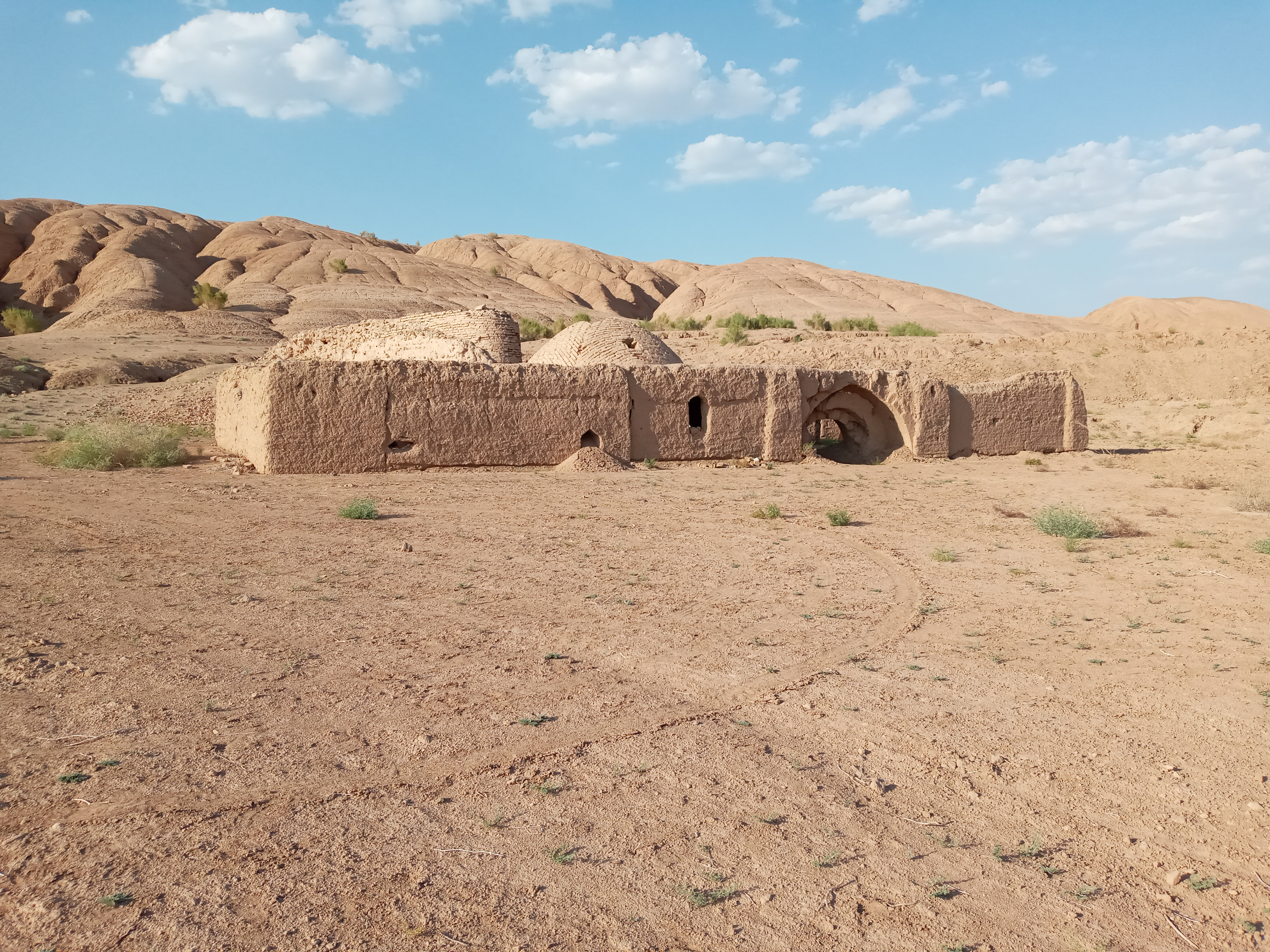
Tala Abad Watermill

=== Talaabad Watermill ===
Talaabad Watermill is a Watermill related to the late Safavid period and is located in Kashmar County, Central District, Quzhd village.

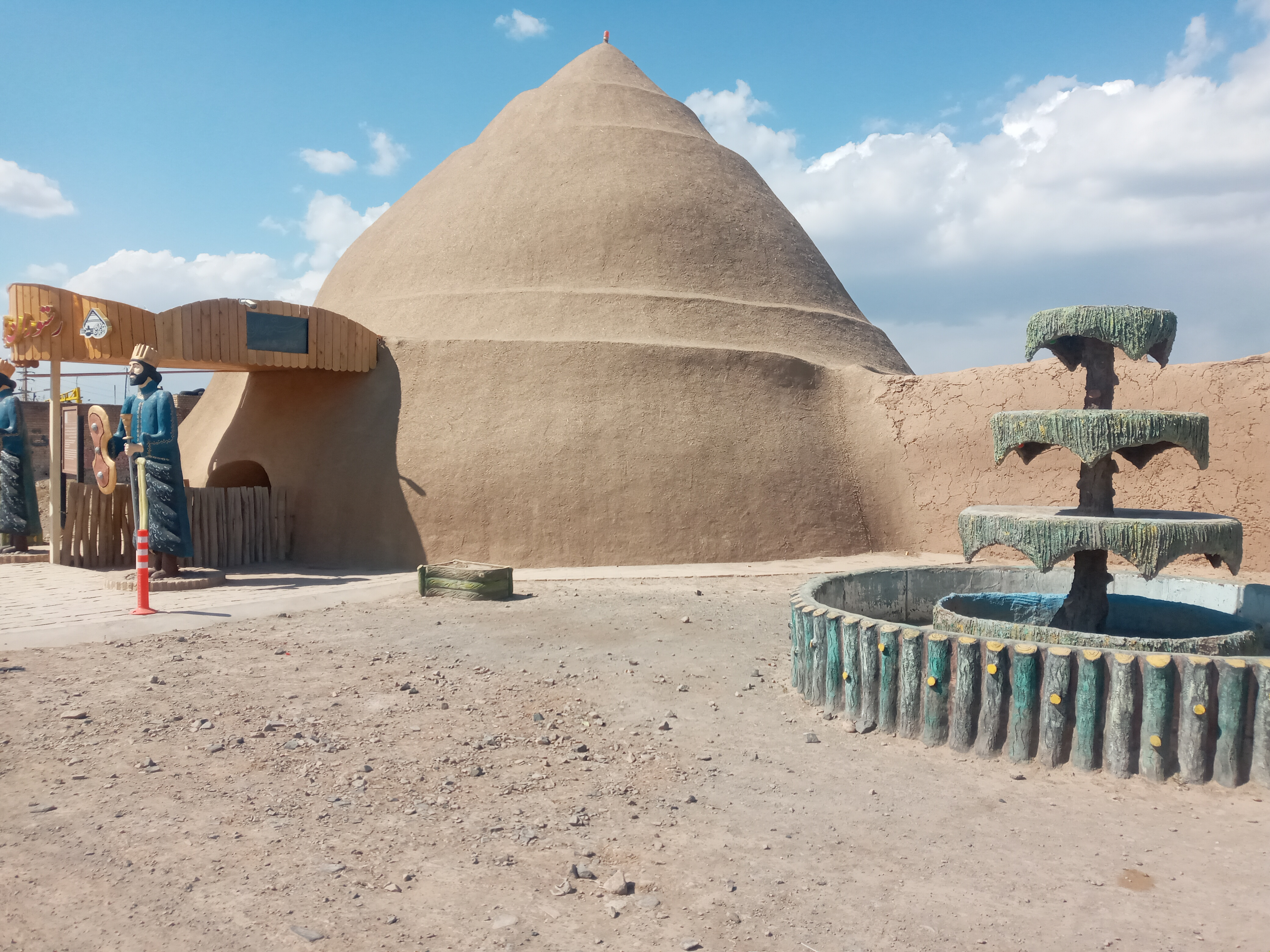
Yakhchāl of Kashmar

=== Yakhchāl of Kashmar ===
The Yakhchāl of Kashmar is a historical Yakhchāl belongs to the Qajar dynasty and is located in Kashmar County, Razavi Khorasan Province.

=== Arg of Kashmar ===
Arg of Kashmar Or Arg of Hosen is a historical Citadel located in Kashmar County in Razavi Khorasan Province, The lifespan of this building goes back to Qajar dynasty.

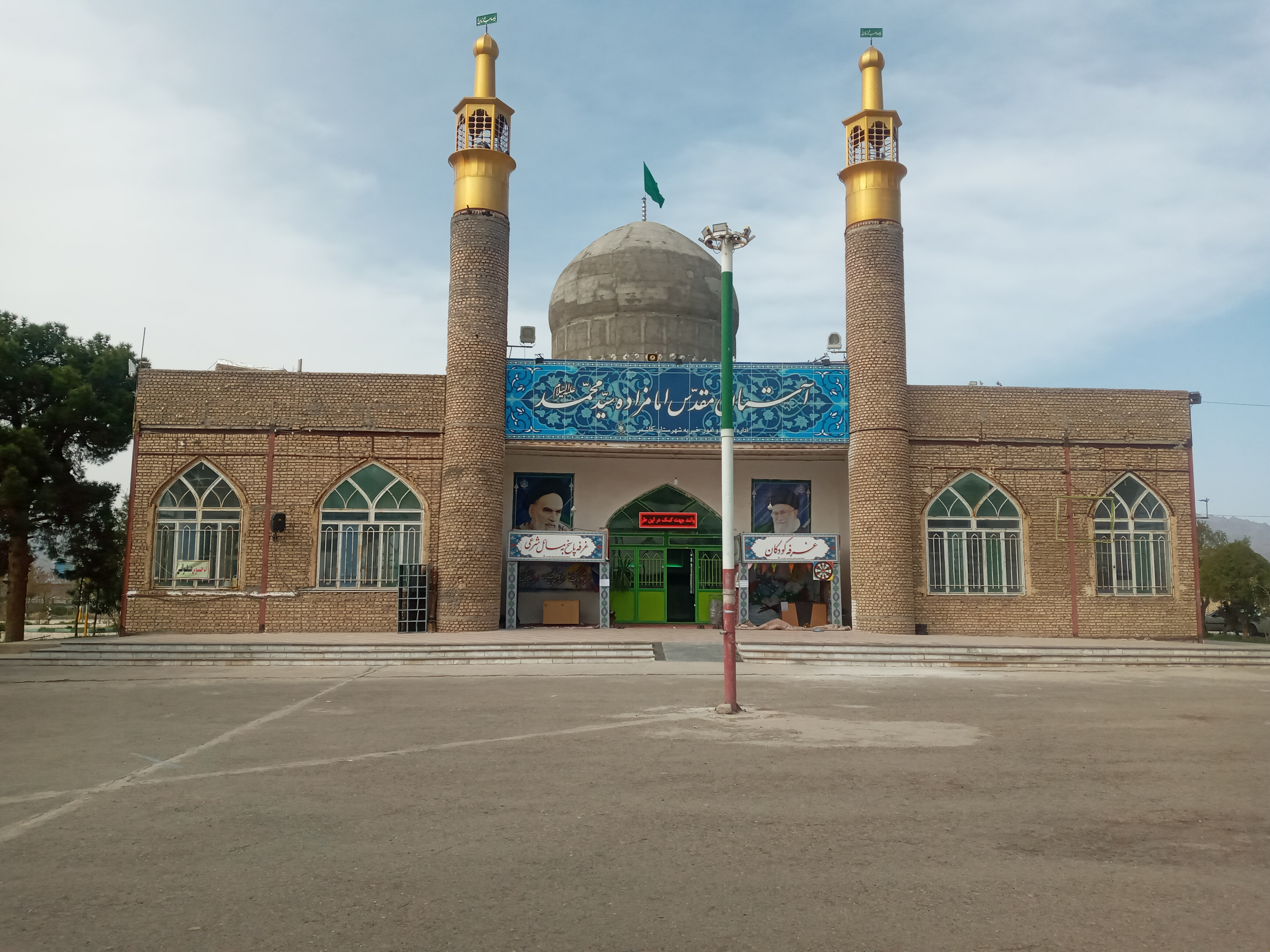
Imamzadeh Mohammad

=== Imamzadeh Mohammad ===
Imamzadeh Mohammad is a Imamzadeh who belongs to the History of modern and is located in Kashmar County, Razavi Khorasan Province in Iran.

=== Grave of Pir Quzhd ===
Grave of Pir Quzhd is a historical Grave related to the Before the 11th century AH and is located in Quzhd, Razavi Khorasan Province.

=== Qanats of Quzhd ===
The Qanats of Quzhd is a historical Qanat is located in Quzhd in Kashmar County.

=== Seyed Morteza Forest Park ===
The Seyed Morteza Forest Park is a Forest Park is located in Kashmar, Razavi Khorasan Province in Iran.

== Ultralight Airport Kashmar ==
Ultralight Airport Kashmar is an airport in the city of Kashmar in Iran, which is located on a 17-hectare land in the southwest of Razavi Khorasan province, about 240 kilometers from the city of Mashhad; And with one runway, it has the capacity to accept all light and ultralight aircraft.

== Notable people ==
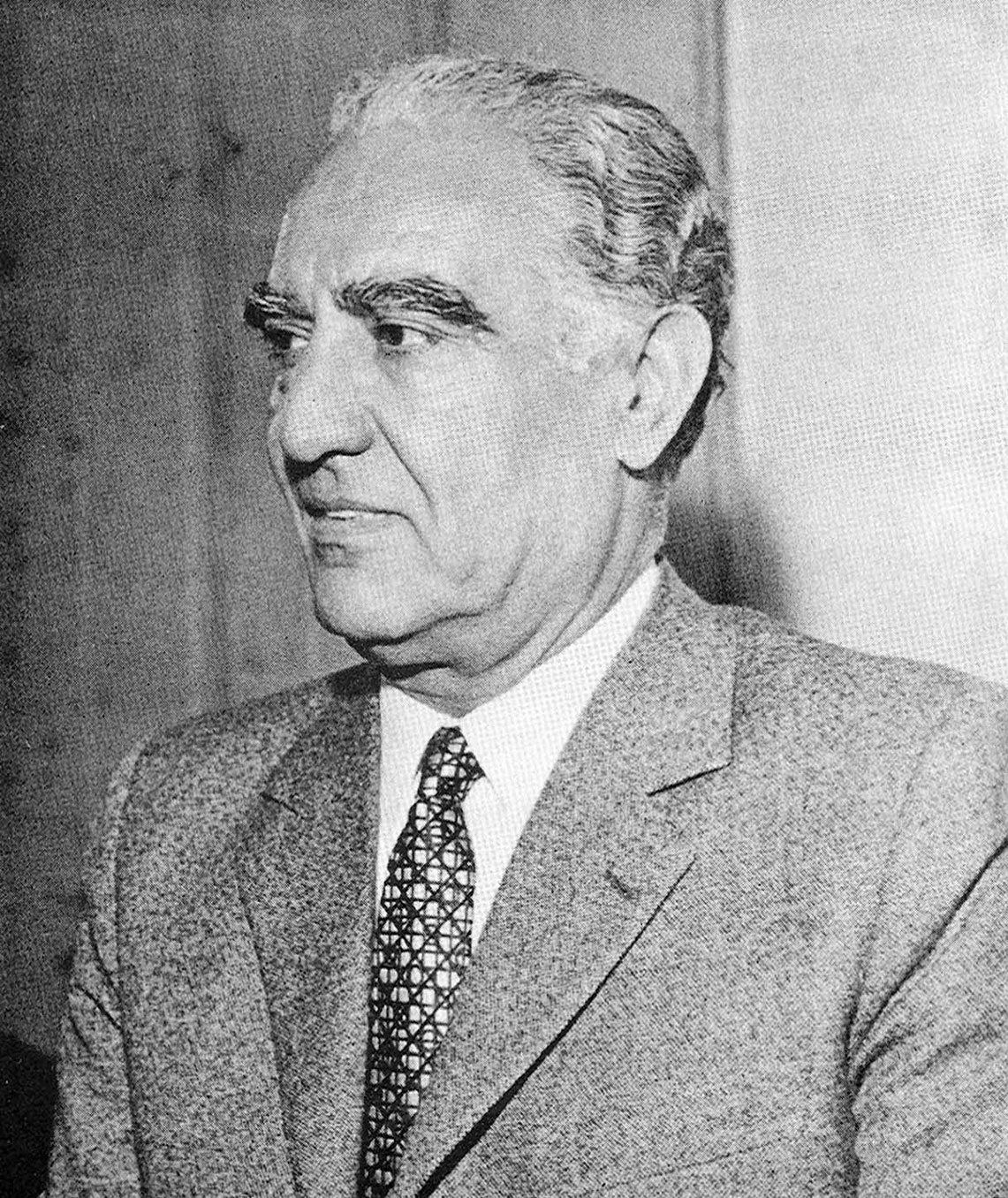
Manouchehr Eghbal in the year 1977

=== Manouchehr Eghbal ===
Manuchehr Eqbal (Persian: منوچهر اقبال; 13 October 1909 – 25 November 1977) was an Iranian royalist politician. He held office as the Prime Minister of Iran from 1957 to 1960. He served as the minister of health in Ahmad Ghavam's cabinet, minister of culture in Abdolhosein Hazhir's cabinet, minister of transportation in RajabAli Mansur's cabinet, and interior minister in Mohammad Sa'ed's cabinet. He also served as the governor of East Azarbaijan province. In 1957, he became prime minister, replacing Hussein Ala. Eghbal continued as prime minister until fall 1960 and was replaced by Sharif Emami. Until his death, he served as a top executive in Iran's National Oil Company. He was also one of the close aides to the Shah.

=== Fateme Ekhtesari ===
Fateme Ekhtesari, also Fatemeh Ekhtesari, (born 1986) is an Iranian poet. Ekhtesari lived in Karaj and she writes in Persian. In 2013, she appeared at the poetry festival in Gothenburg (Göteborgs poesifestival). After she arrived back in Iran she was imprisoned and later released on bail. Her verdict came in 2015 when she was sentenced to 99 lashes and 11.5 years imprisonment for crimes against the Iranian government, for immoral behaviour and blasphemy.

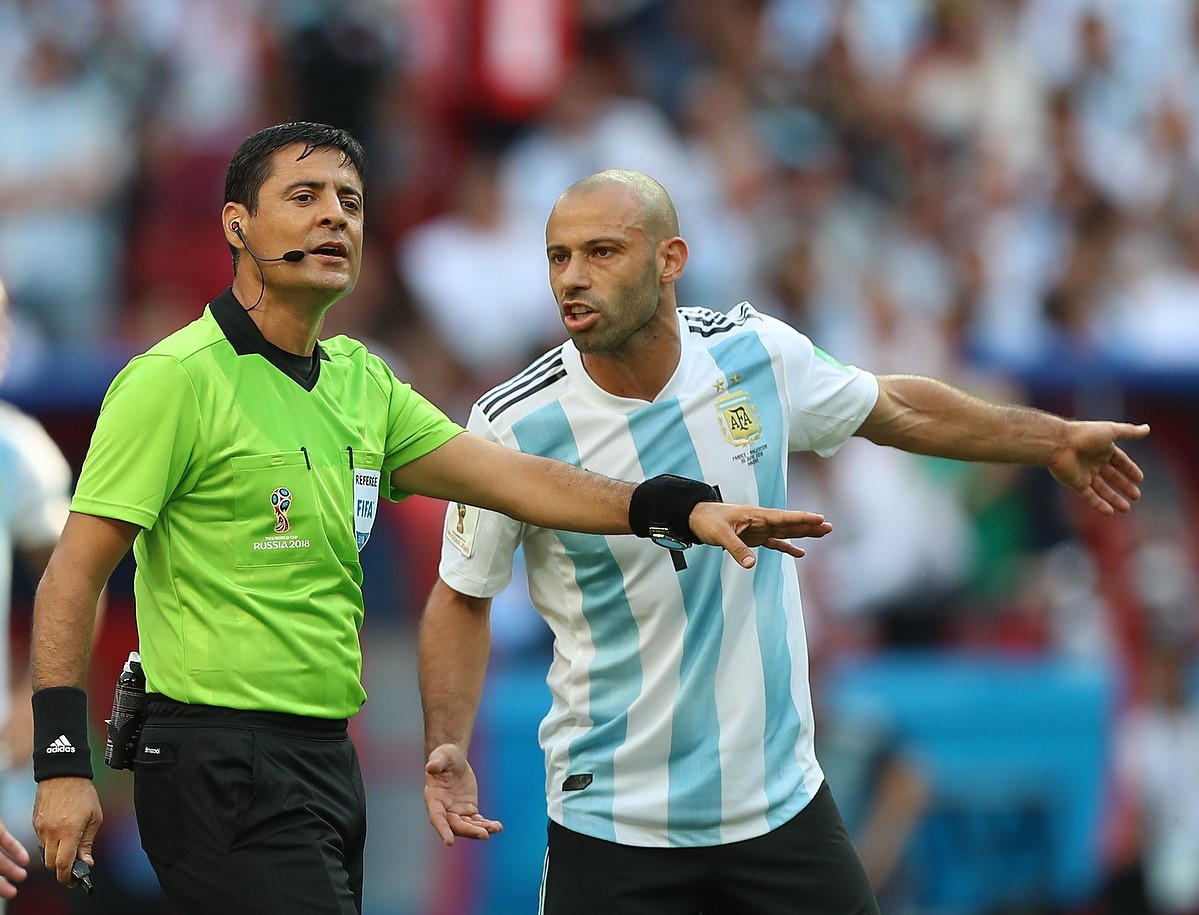
Alireza Faghani referring the France vs Argentina match in the round of 16 of 2018 FIFA World Cup

=== Alireza Faghani ===
Alireza Faghani (Persian: عليرضا فغانى, born 21 March 1978) is an Iranian international football referee who has been officiating in the Persian Gulf Pro League for several seasons and has been on the FIFA list since 2008. Faghani has refereed important matches such as the 2014 AFC Champions League Final, the 2015 AFC Asian Cup Final, the 2015 FIFA Club World Cup Final, the 2016 Olympic football final match. He has refereed matches in the 2017 Liga 1, 2017 FIFA Confederations Cup, 2018 FIFA World Cup in Russia and the 2019 AFC Asian Cup. Alireza migrated to Australia in September 2019.

=== Fereydoun Jeyrani ===
Fereydoun Jeyrani (Persian: فریدون جیرانی; born in 1951, Bardaskan) is an Iranian film director, screenwriter, and Television presenter. He was the director, producer and host of haft (Seven) (an Iranian television series about Iranian Cinema) until 2012. Along with his unconventional performance in Haft, he is best known for directing Red, The Season Salad, Water and Fire, Pink and I am a Mother. Jeyrani TV Host Haft First series.

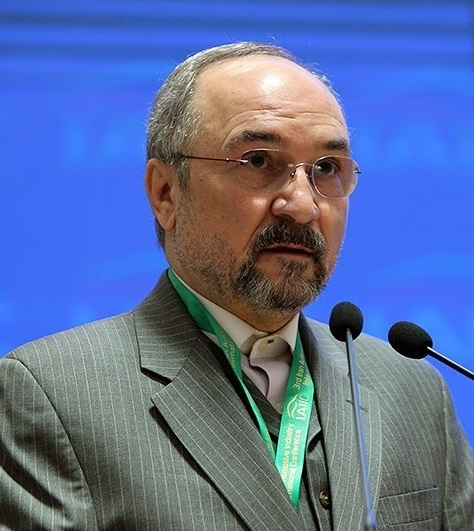
Mohammad Khazaee in the year 2016

=== Mohammad Khazaee ===
Mohammad Khazaee (Persian: محمد خزاعی, born 12 April 1953 in Kashmar, Iran) is the former Ambassador of Iran to the United Nations. He presented his credentials to the United Nations Secretary-General Ban Ki-moon in July 2007. He was elected as Vice President of the United Nations General Assembly on 14 September 2011.

=== Ali Rahmani ===
Ali Rahmani (علی رحمانی) was born in Kashmar (25 May 1967). He was the first managing director of Tehran Stock Exchange. He is an associate professor at Alzahra University.

=== Iran Teymourtash ===
Iran Teymourtāsh (Persian: ایران تیمورتاش; 1914–1991), the eldest daughter of Abdolhossein Teymourtāsh, is considered a pioneer among women activists in 20th-century Iran. Her father's position as the second most powerful political personality in Iran, from 1925 to 1932, afforded Iran Teymourtāsh the opportunity to play a prominent role in that country's women's affairs early in life.

== Military operations ==
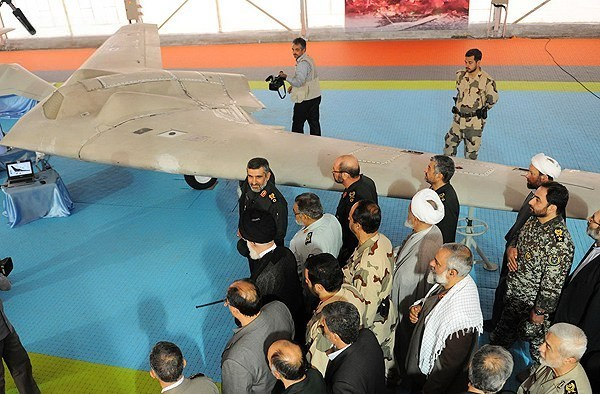
RQ-170 in Iran

=== Iran–U.S. RQ-170 incident ===
On 5 December 2011, an American Lockheed Martin RQ-170 Sentinel unmanned aerial vehicle (UAV) was captured by Iranian forces near the city of Kashmar in northeastern Iran. The Iranian government announced that the UAV was brought down by its cyberwarfare unit which commandeered the aircraft and safely landed it, after initial reports from Western news sources disputedly claimed that it had been "shot down". The United States government initially denied the claims but later President Obama acknowledged that the downed aircraft was a US drone. Iran filed a complaint to the UN over the airspace violation. Obama asked Iran to return the drone. Iran is said to have produced drones based on the captured RQ-170.

== Ban of Americans ==
In 2018, a pair of American citizens were issued hunting permits by the city of Kashmar. This was seen as irregular, and a commission was formed to protect the interests of the city against foreign influence. All involved departments were investigated severely and American citizens were banned from entering the city.

== Kashmar Great earthquake ==
The Kashmar earthquake occurred on 25 September 1903, at 1:20 am UTC time in Iran. Its magnitude is 6.5 on the Richter scale. The U.S. Geological Survey also estimated the quake at 35.2°N 58.2°E E and its magnitude was 6.5 on the Richter scale..

The death toll from the earthquake was about 200.

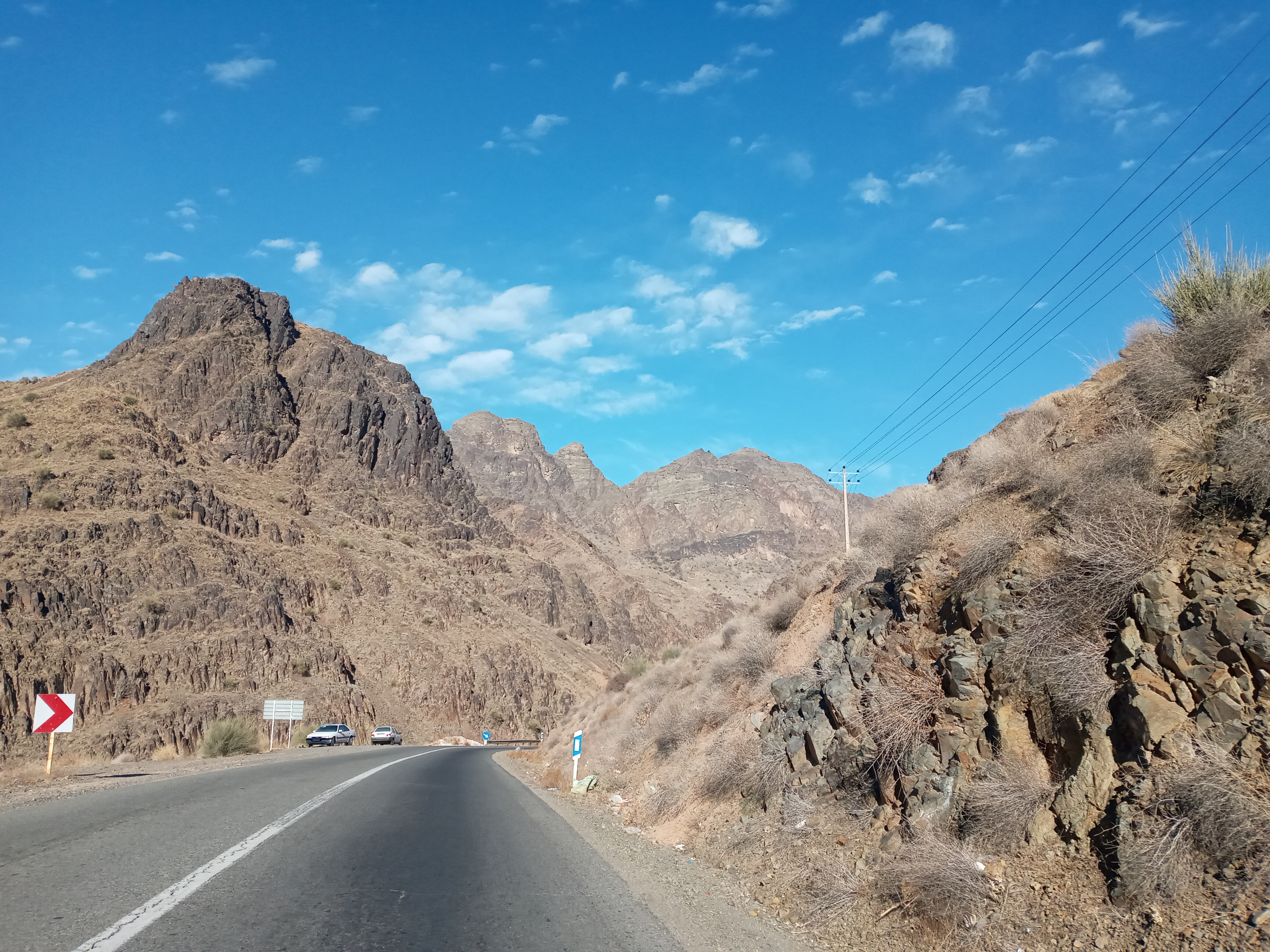
Kashmar–Kuhsorkh Road

== Geographical location ==
Kashmar County with two central district and Farah Dasht, and to the center of Kashmar city has occupied an area of about 3390 square kilometers of Khorasan Razavi Province With the County of Kuhsorkh. This city is adjacent to Khalilabad from the west, to Nishapur and Bardaskan from the north and northwest, to Torbat-e Heydarieh from the east and northeast, and to the Feyzabad from the south and southwest. Kashmar city has two mountainous areas of the Rivash in the north and Fagan Bajestan heights in the south and desert and arid regions in the west and south and fertile plains in the suburbs and its towns. In terms of climate, it can be said that Kashmar has all three types of climate because the northern parts of the city are mountainous and cold, the central regions are temperate and the southern regions are arid and semi-arid due to its proximity to the Lut desert.

== Climate ==
Köppen-Geiger climate classification system classifies its climate as cold desert (BWk) with short, cool winters and long, hot summers.

Climate data for Kashmar (1991–2020)
Month	Jan	Feb	Mar	Apr	May	Jun	Jul	Aug	Sep	Oct	Nov	Dec	Year
Record high °C (°F)	21.0 (69.8)	26.4 (79.5)	33.4 (92.1)	35.4 (95.7)	38.6 (101.5)	43.0 (109.4)	42.6 (108.7)	42.6 (108.7)	38.4 (101.1)	35.2 (95.4)	28.4 (83.1)	24.4 (75.9)	43.0 (109.4)
Mean daily maximum °C (°F)	9.3 (48.7)	12.0 (53.6)	17.4 (63.3)	24.1 (75.4)	30.2 (86.4)	35.5 (95.9)	37.2 (99.0)	35.8 (96.4)	31.7 (89.1)	25.2 (77.4)	17.1 (62.8)	11.4 (52.5)	23.9 (75.0)
Daily mean °C (°F)	4.4 (39.9)	6.9 (44.4)	12.0 (53.6)	18.5 (65.3)	24.3 (75.7)	29.4 (84.9)	31.0 (87.8)	29.2 (84.6)	24.9 (76.8)	18.7 (65.7)	11.5 (52.7)	6.3 (43.3)	18.1 (64.6)
Mean daily minimum °C (°F)	0.4 (32.7)	2.5 (36.5)	7.1 (44.8)	12.8 (55.0)	17.8 (64.0)	22.0 (71.6)	23.5 (74.3)	21.4 (70.5)	17.5 (63.5)	12.5 (54.5)	6.5 (43.7)	2.0 (35.6)	12.2 (54.0)
Record low °C (°F)	−15.8 (3.6)	−12.0 (10.4)	−4.8 (23.4)	−2.0 (28.4)	3.6 (38.5)	12.0 (53.6)	15.6 (60.1)	8.4 (47.1)	6.5 (43.7)	−0.8 (30.6)	−9.3 (15.3)	−8.8 (16.2)	−15.8 (3.6)
Average precipitation mm (inches)	31.1 (1.22)	33.7 (1.33)	45.4 (1.79)	28.5 (1.12)	12.7 (0.50)	1.8 (0.07)	0.7 (0.03)	0.2 (0.01)	1.0 (0.04)	4.4 (0.17)	12.9 (0.51)	22.3 (0.88)	194.7 (7.67)
Average precipitation days (≥ 1.0 mm)	4.6	5.0	5.8	4.3	2.4	0.5	0.1	0.1	0.2	1.0	2.1	3.5	29.6
Average relative humidity (%)	61.0	55.0	48.0	40.0	30.0	22.0	21.0	21.0	23.0	32.0	46.0	57.0	38.0
Average dew point °C (°F)	−3.1 (26.4)	−2.1 (28.2)	0.4 (32.7)	3.5 (38.3)	4.9 (40.8)	5.1 (41.2)	5.8 (42.4)	4.1 (39.4)	1.7 (35.1)	1.0 (33.8)	−0.8 (30.6)	−2.2 (28.0)	1.5 (34.7)
Mean monthly sunshine hours	184.0	186.0	212.0	251.0	308.0	348.0	370.0	361.0	317.0	281.0	215.0	188.0	3,221
Source: NOAA

== Gallery ==
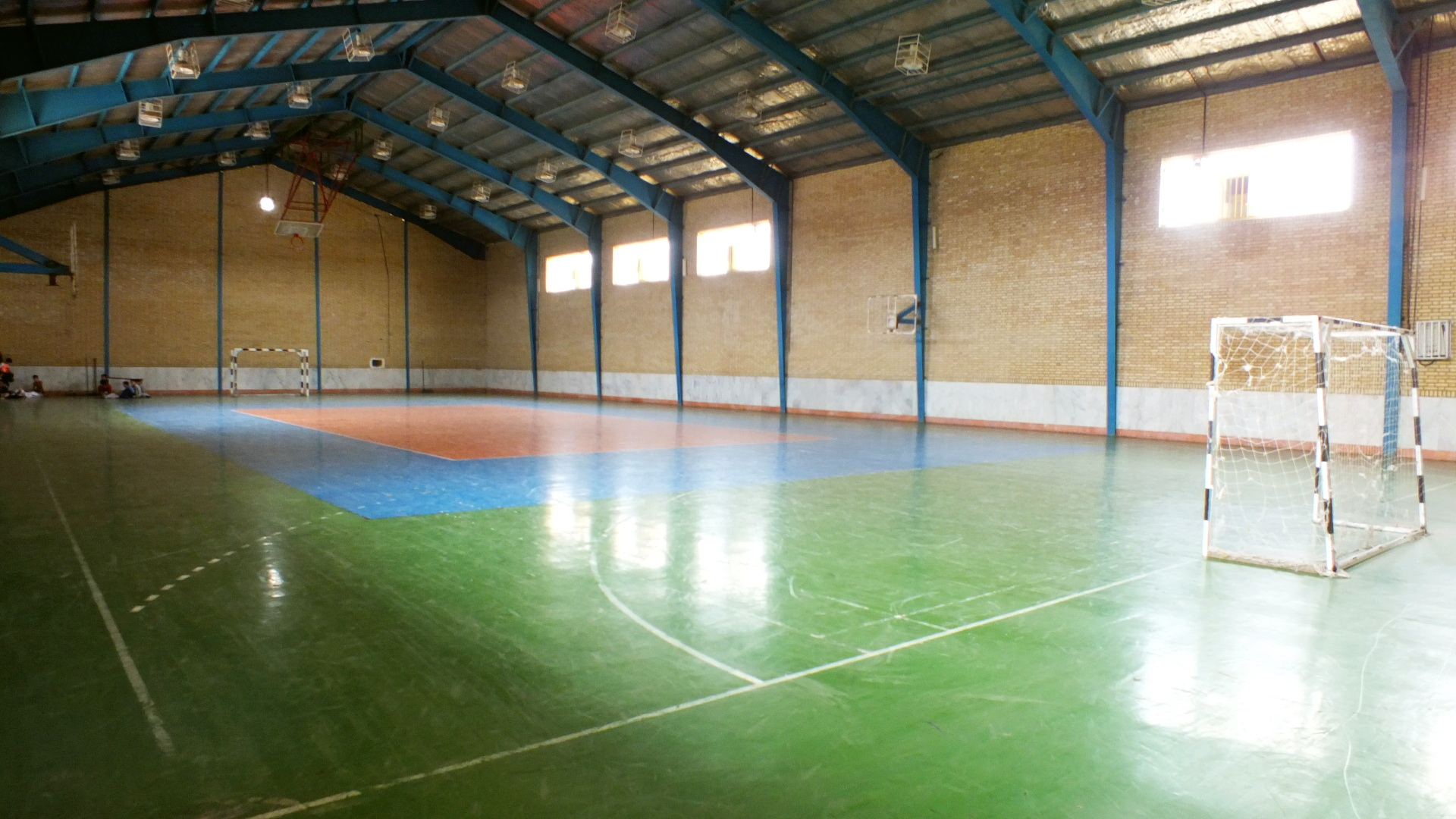
Kashmar Enghelab sport complex

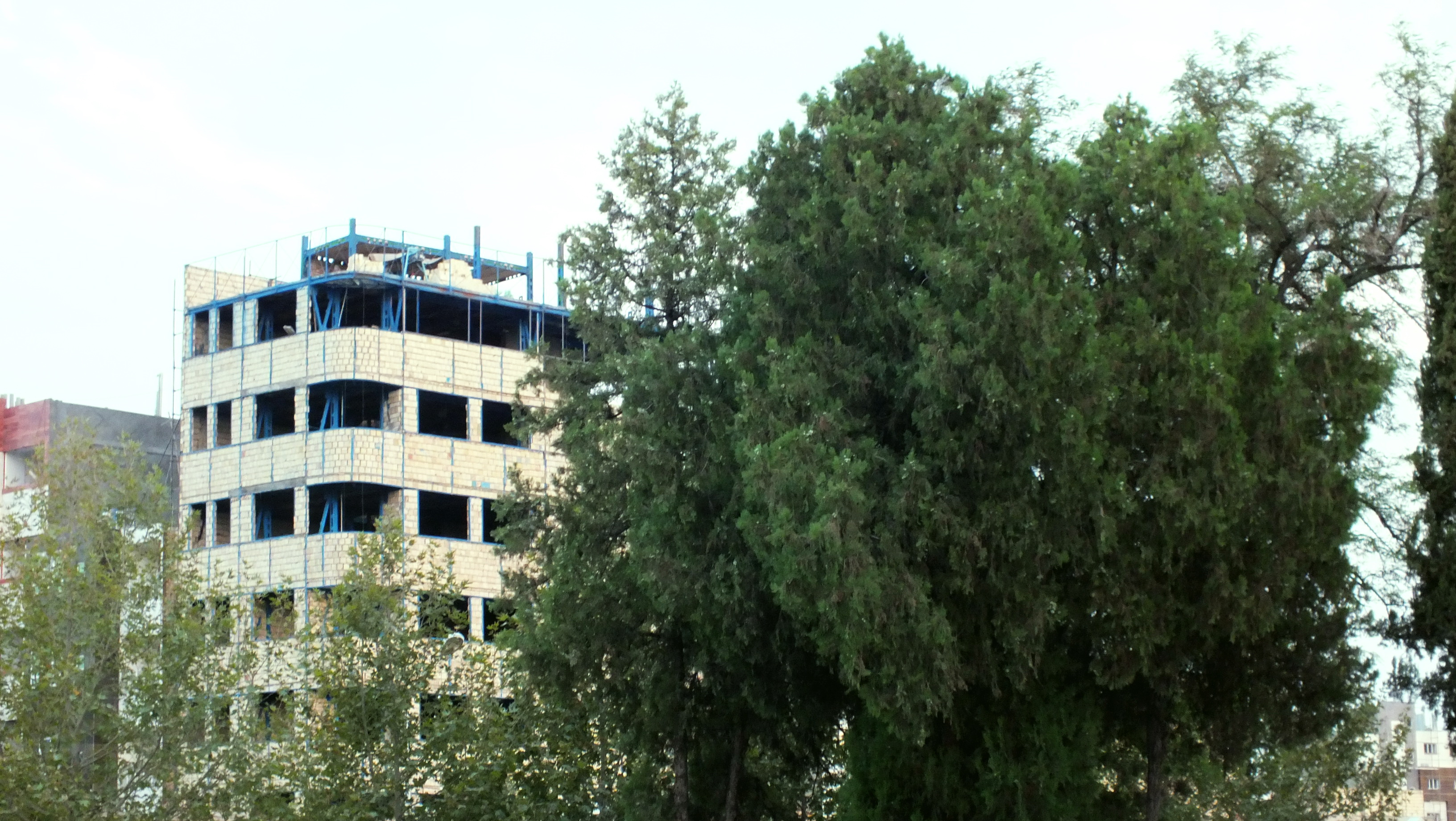
Tree in Kudak park

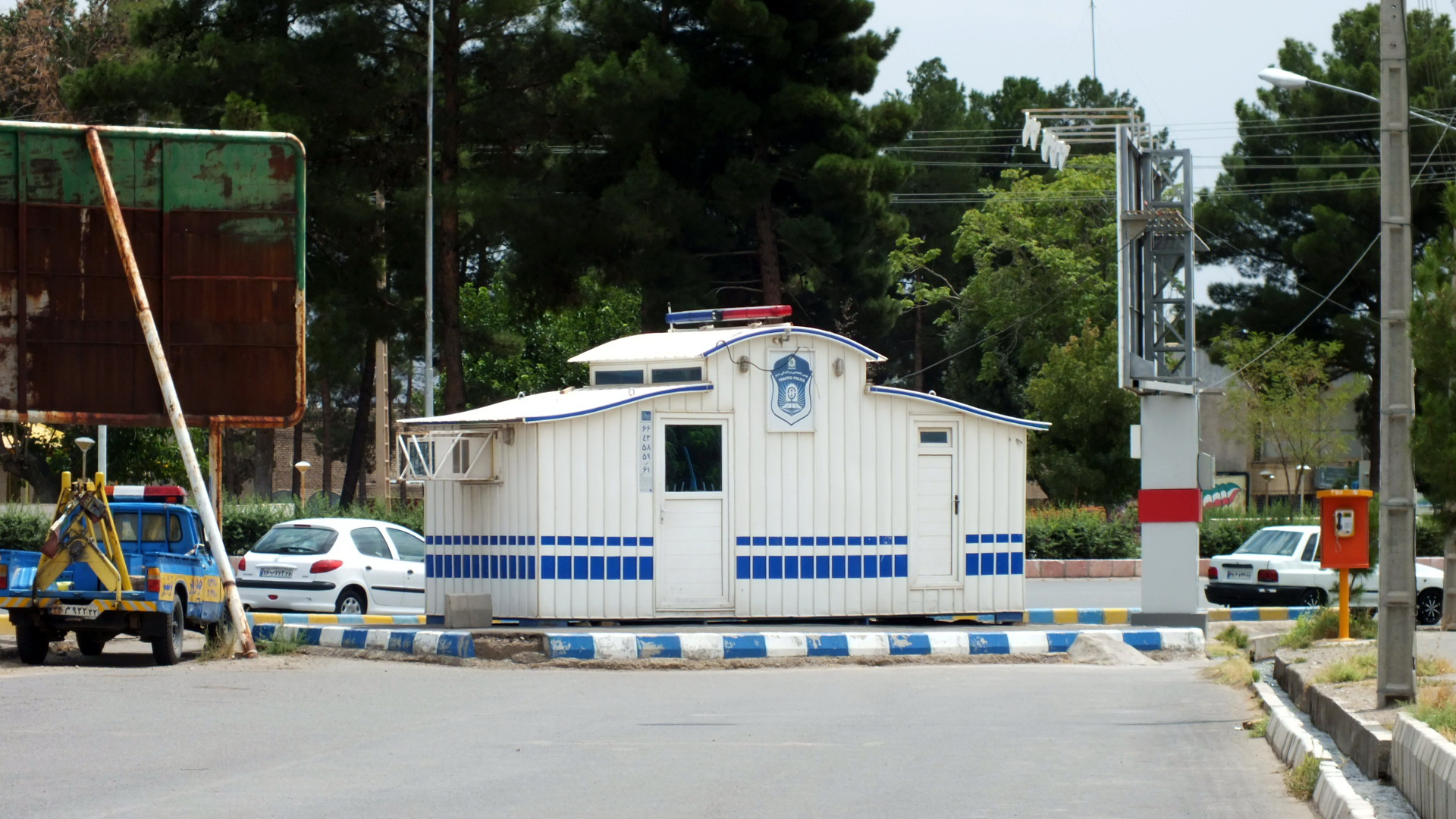
Traffic police booth

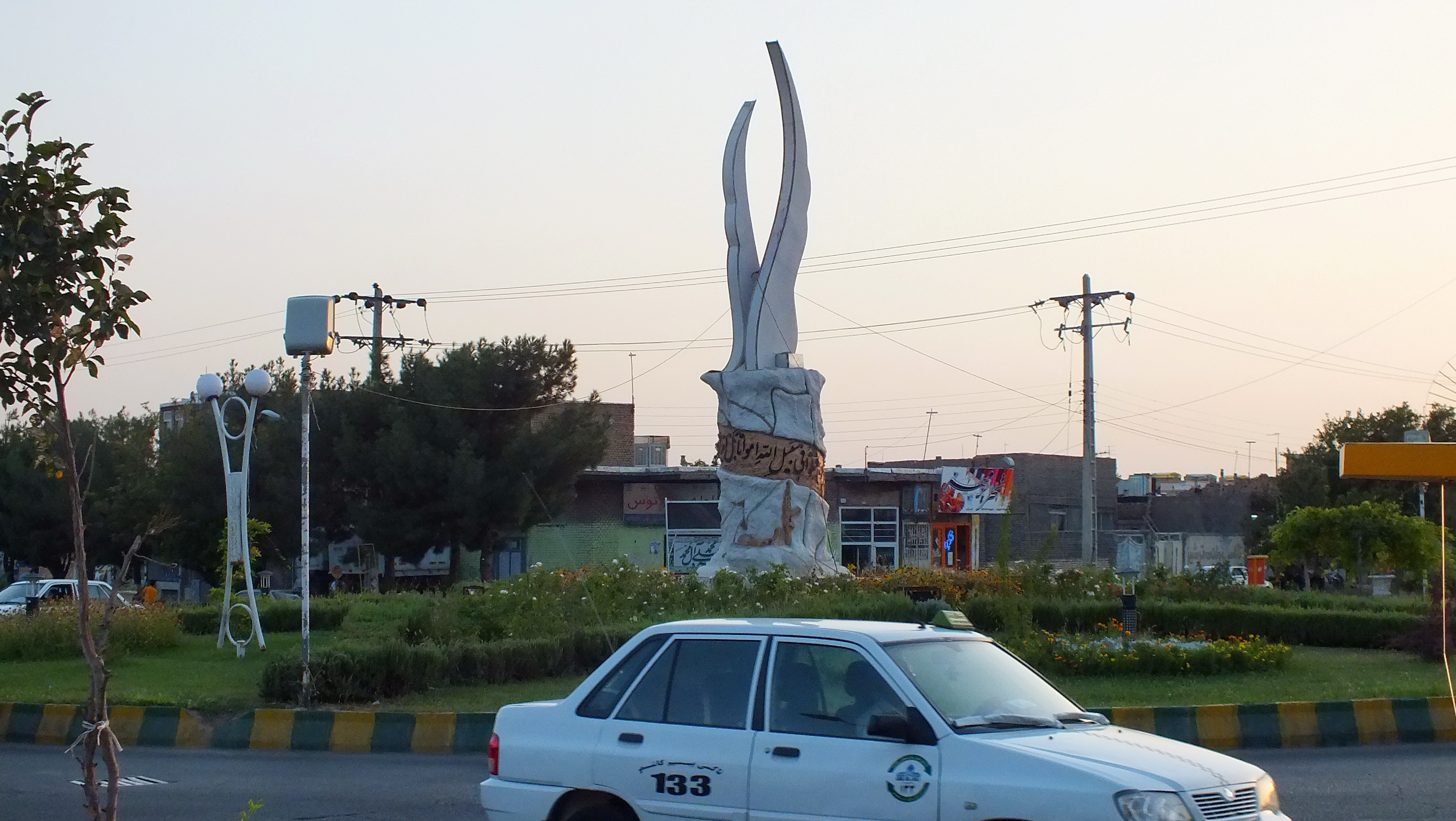
Shohada' Square

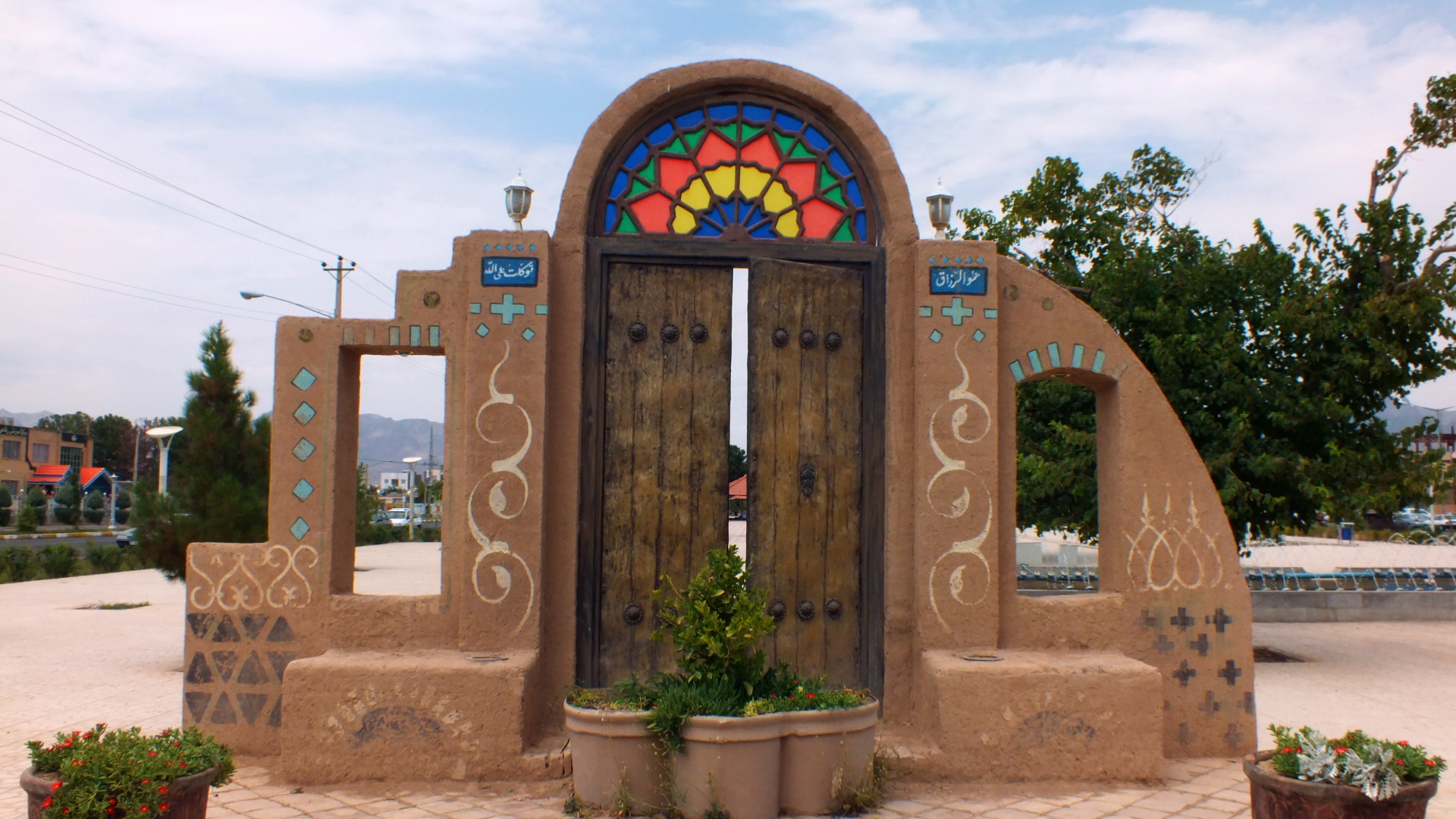
Old wooden door Symbol Kashmar

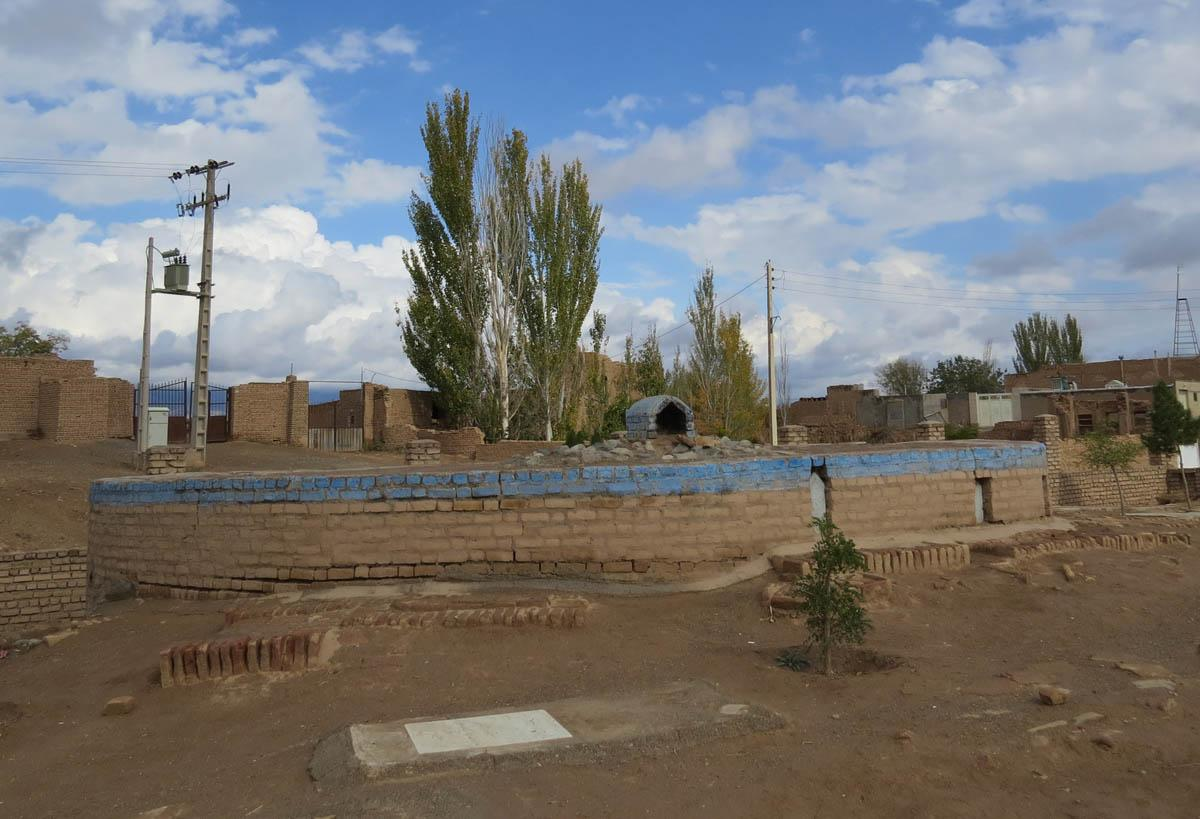
Grave of Pir Quzhd

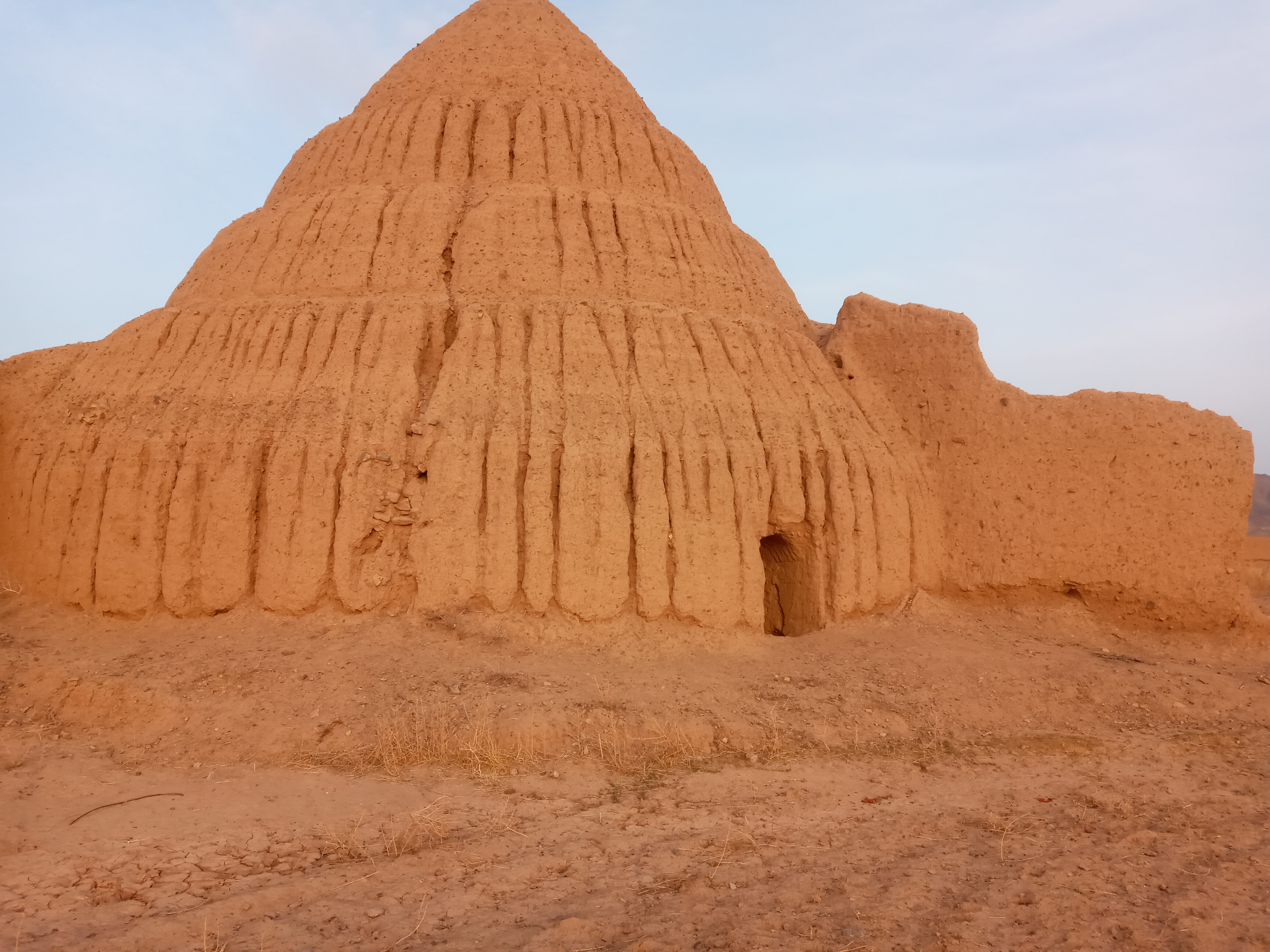
Yakhchāl of Eshaqabad

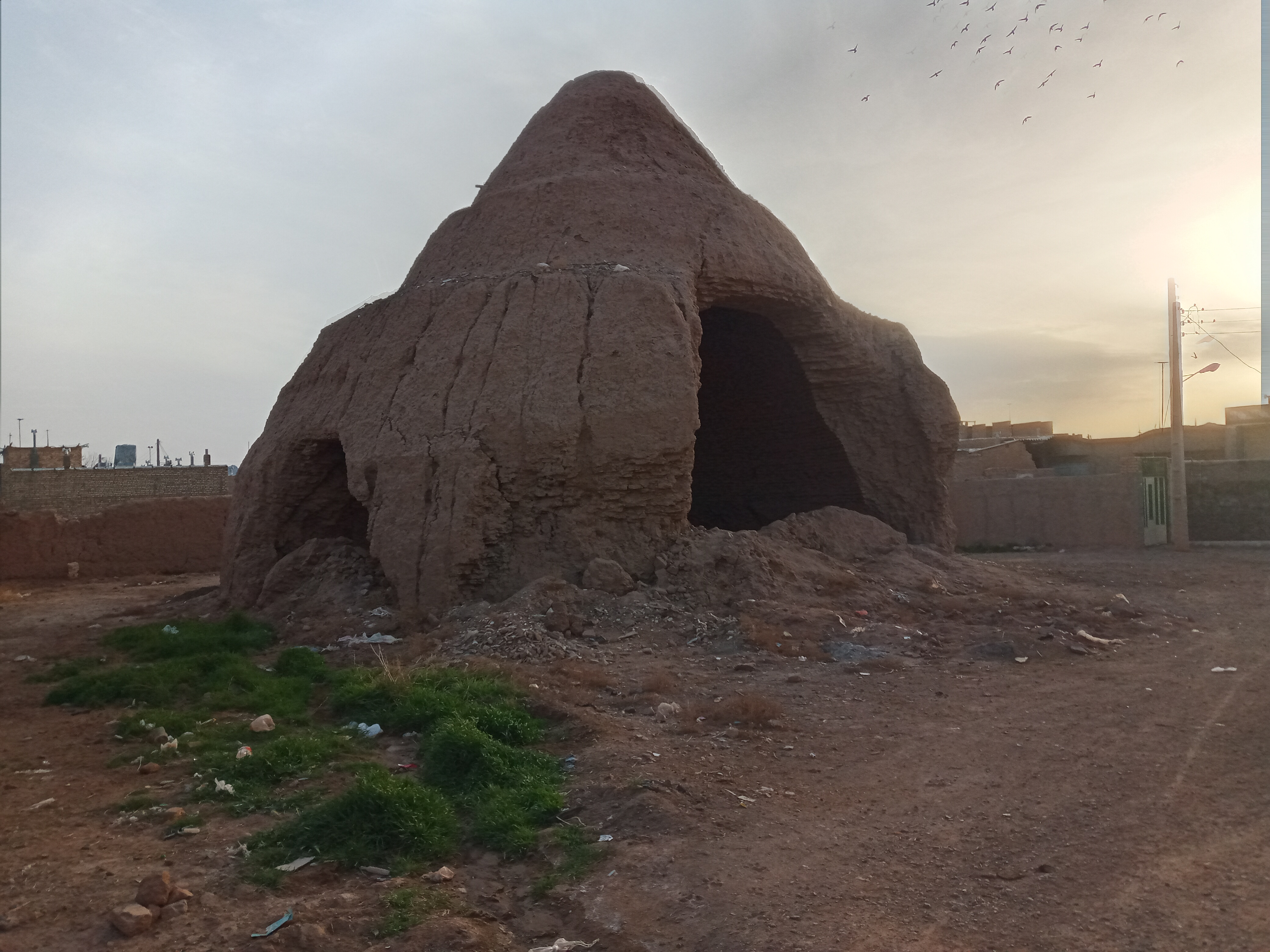
Yakhchāl of Talabad

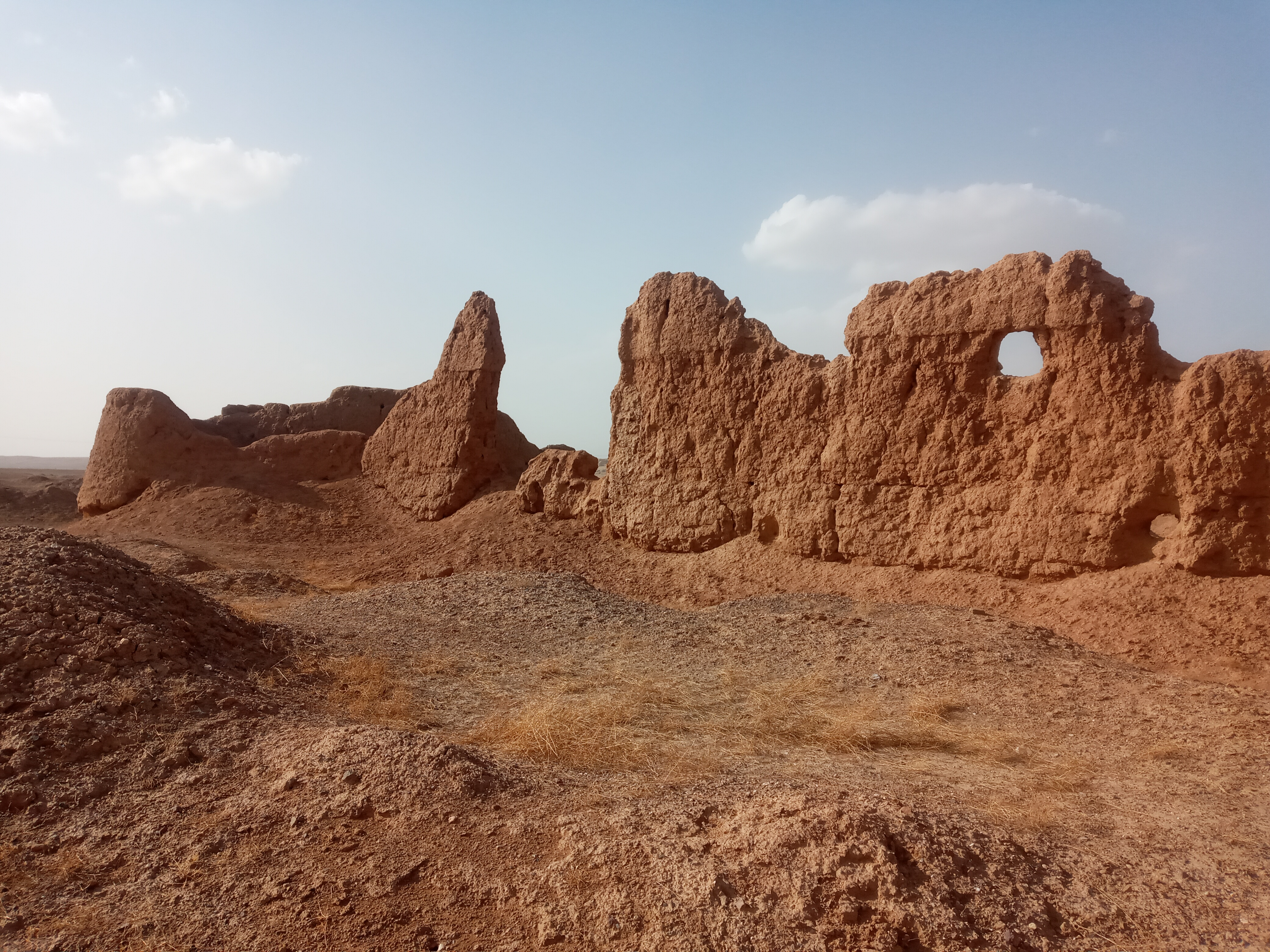
Rig Castle

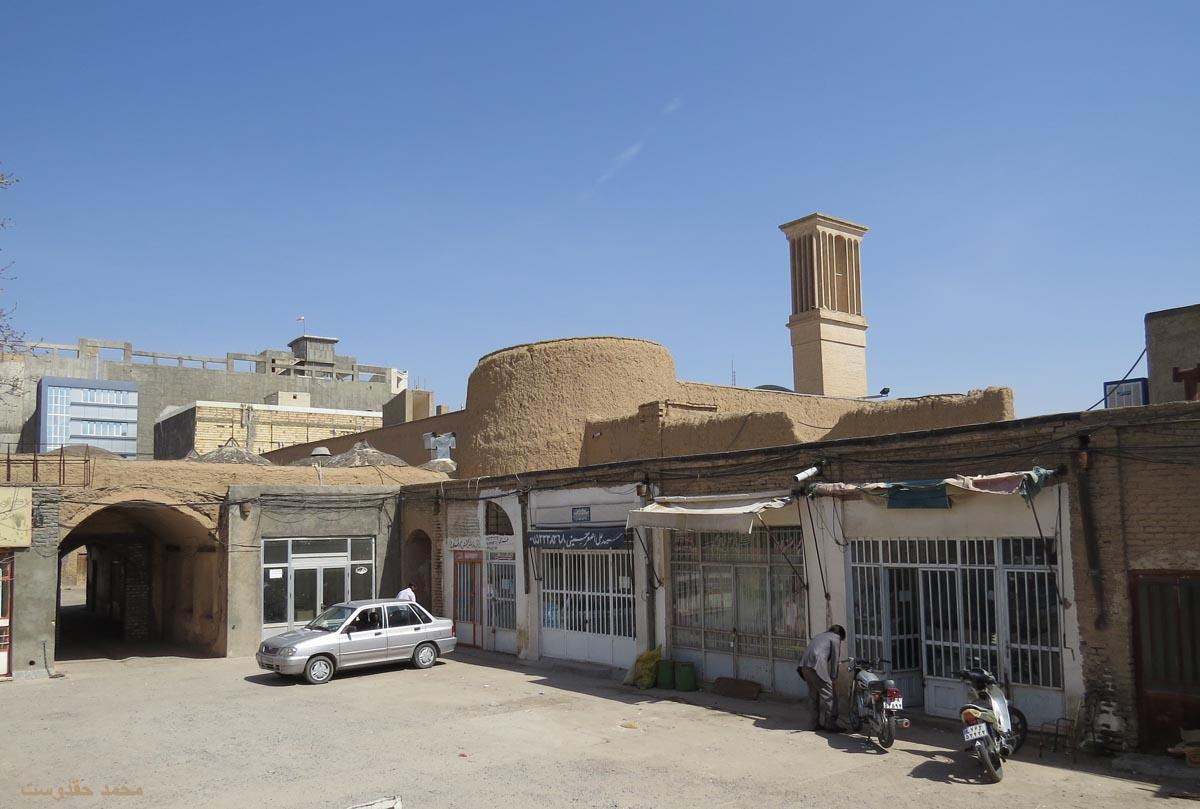
Amin al-tojar Caravansarai

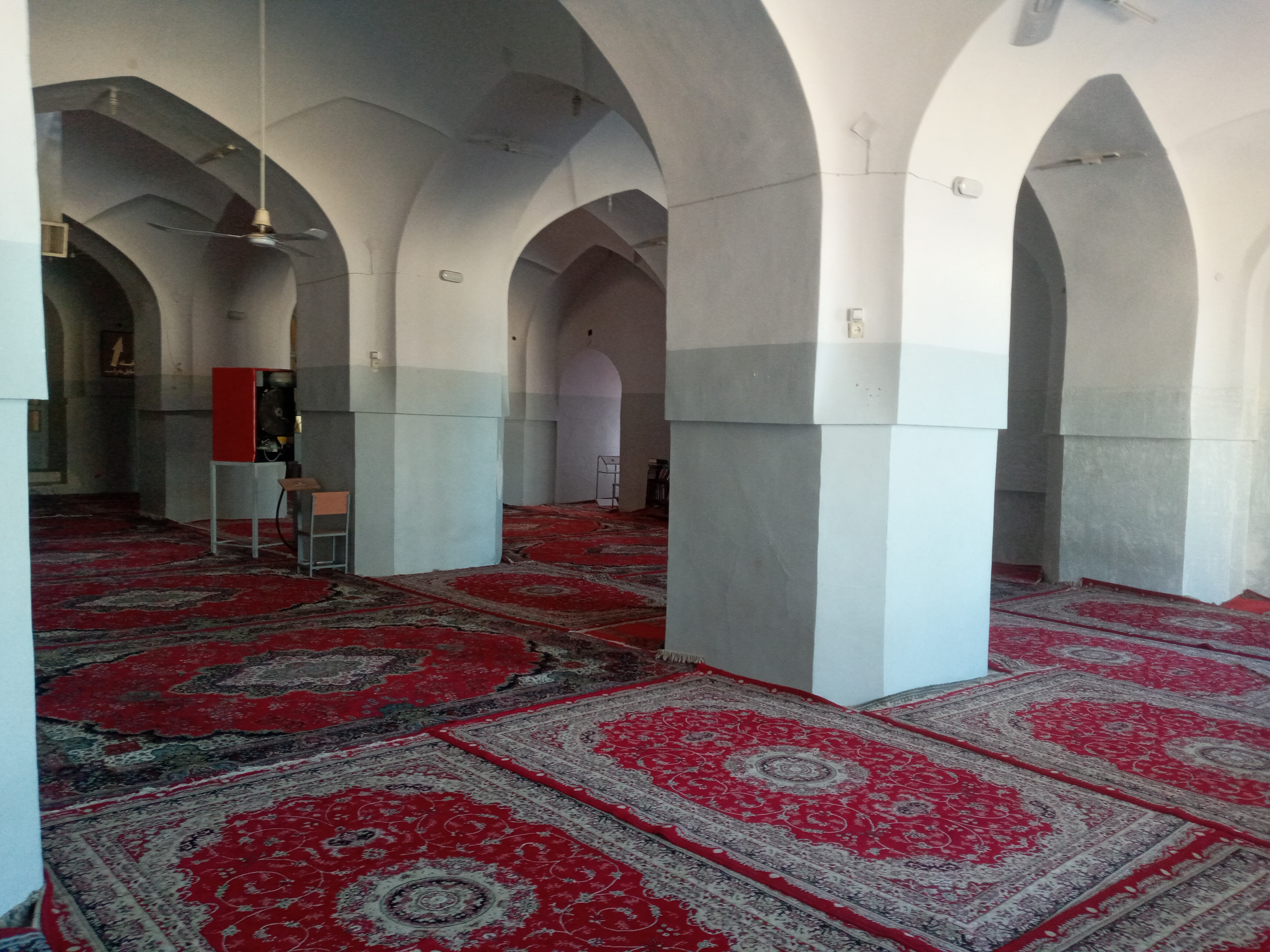
Jameh Mosque of Kashmar

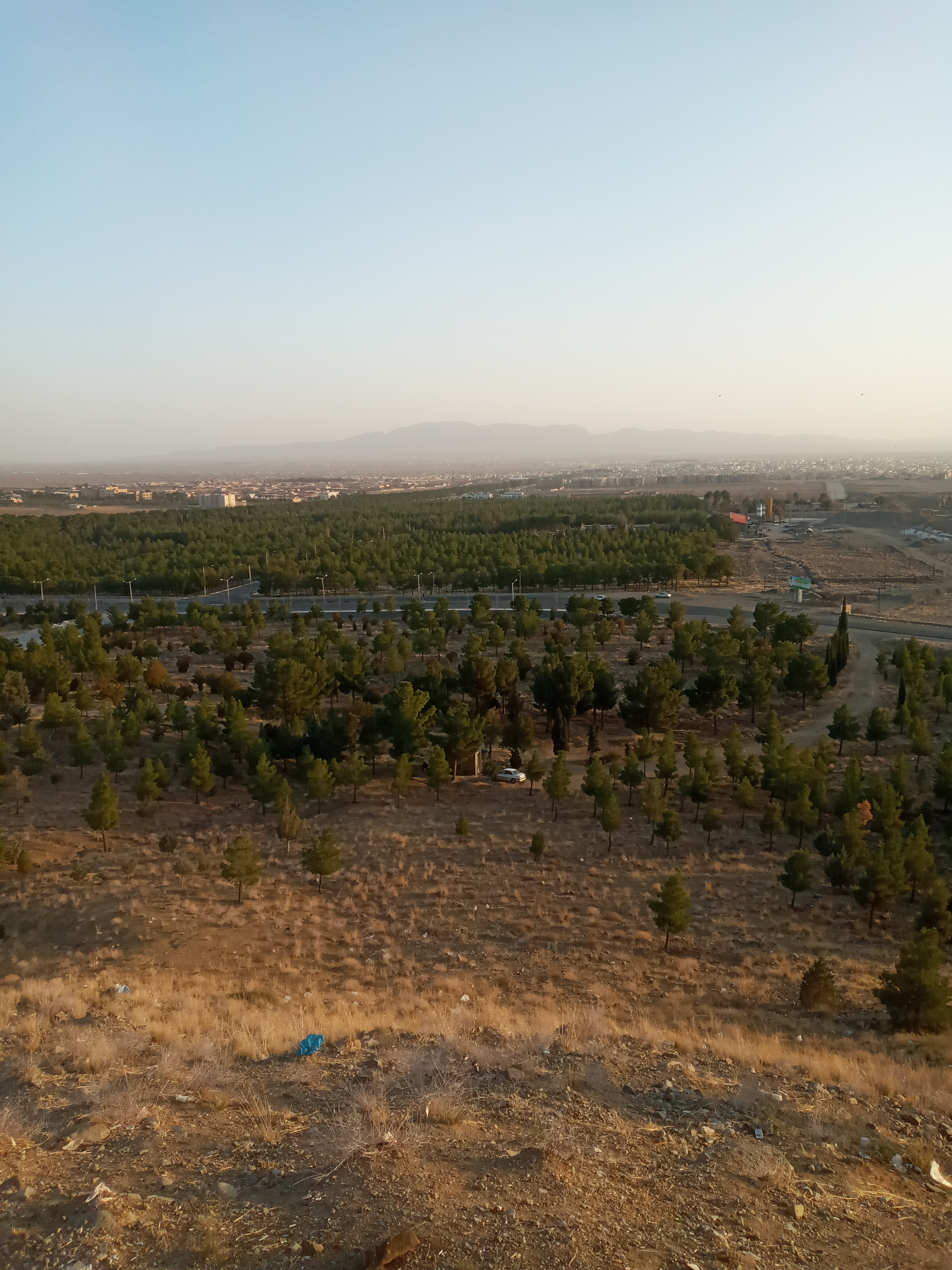
Kashmar in 2021

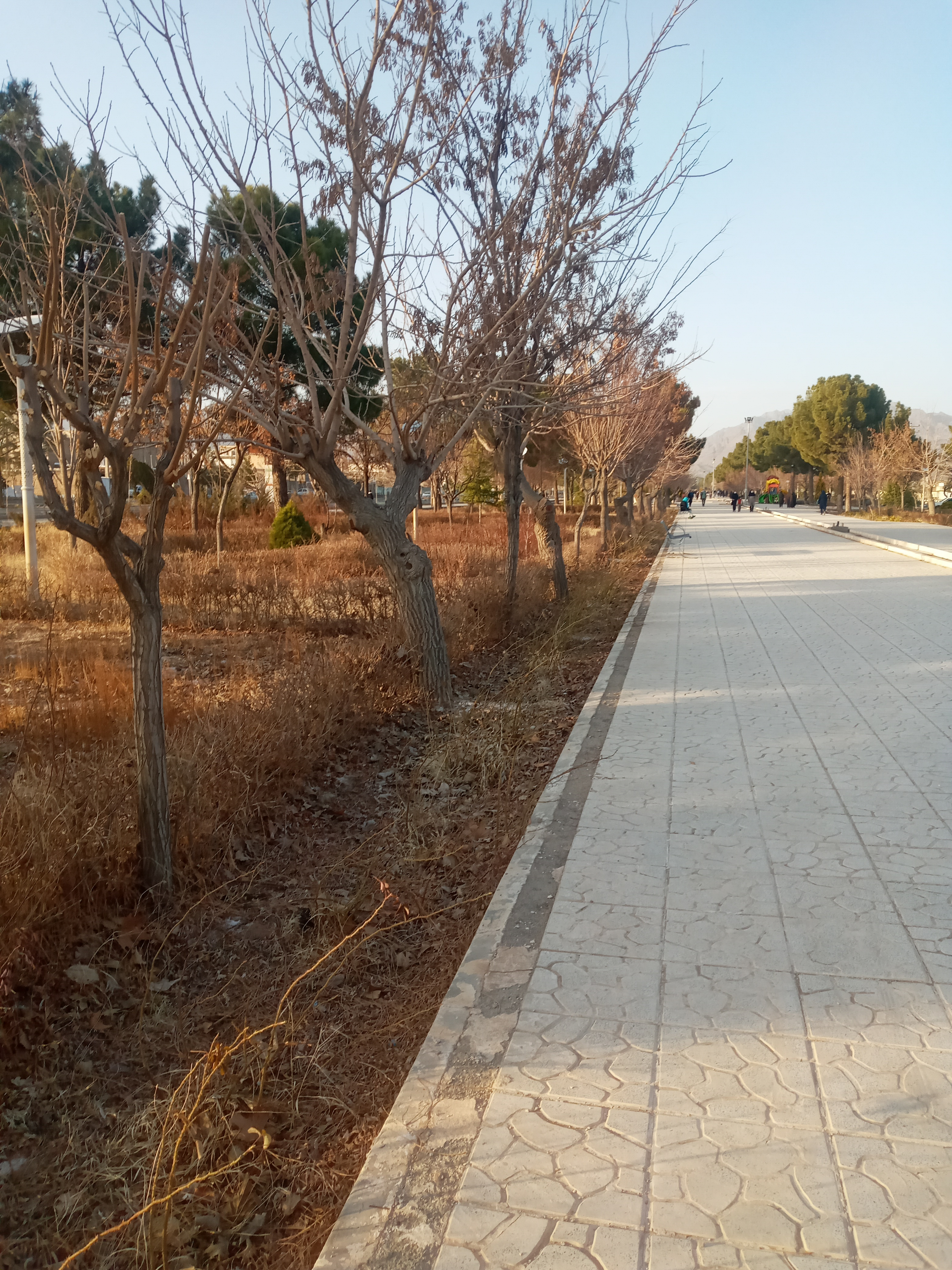
Kashmar in 2021

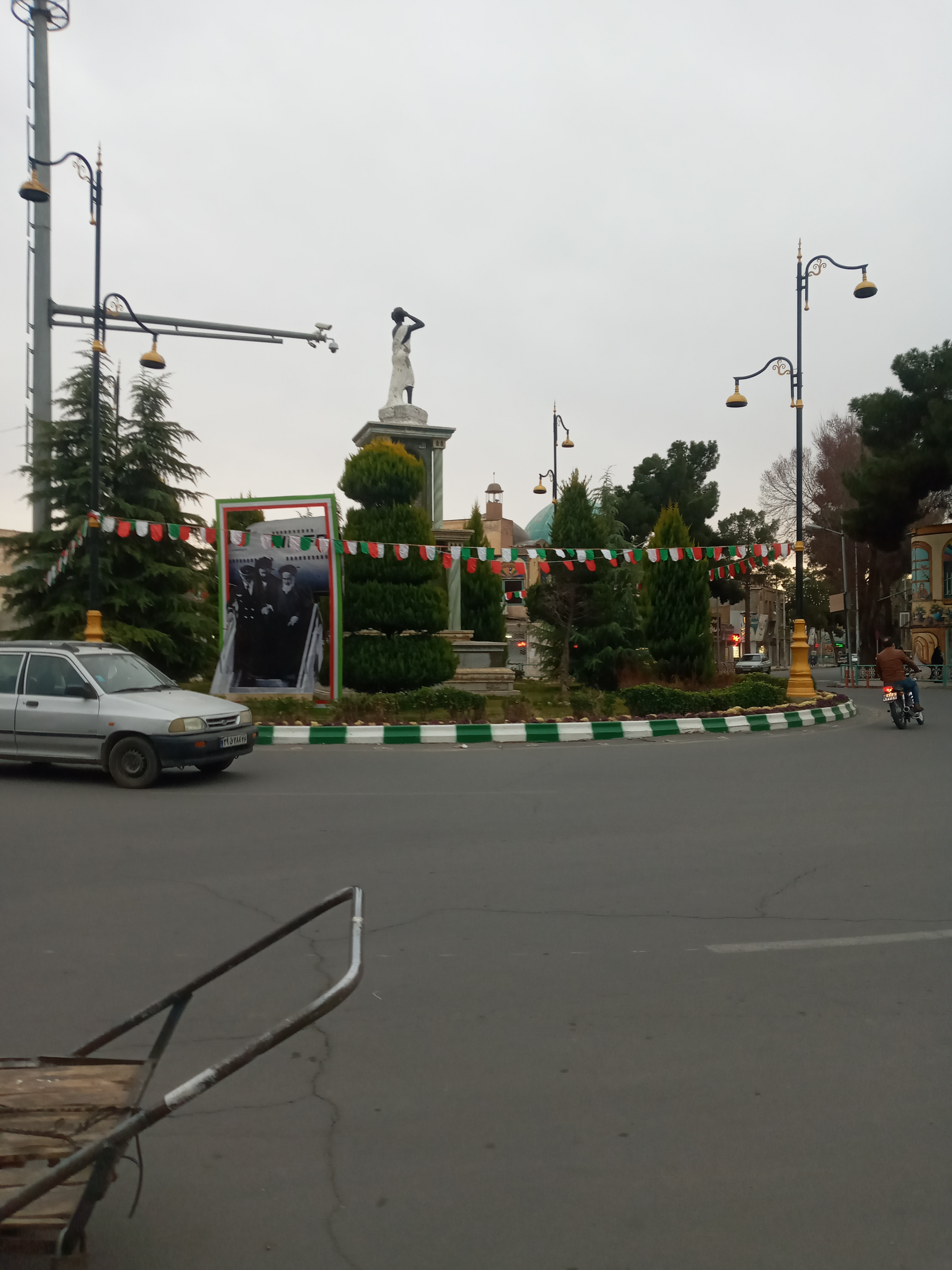
Kashmar in 2021

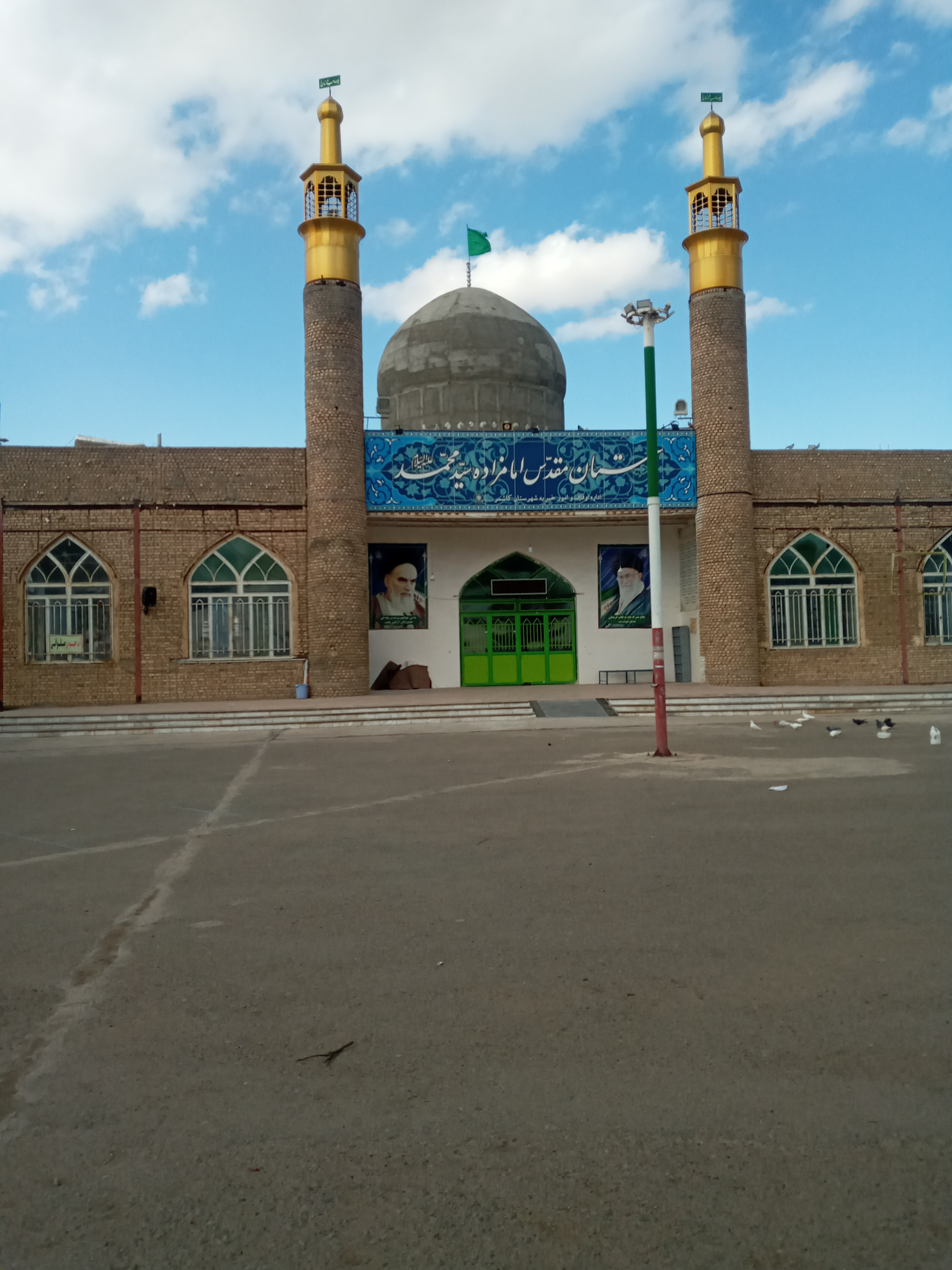
Imamzadeh Mohammad in 2021

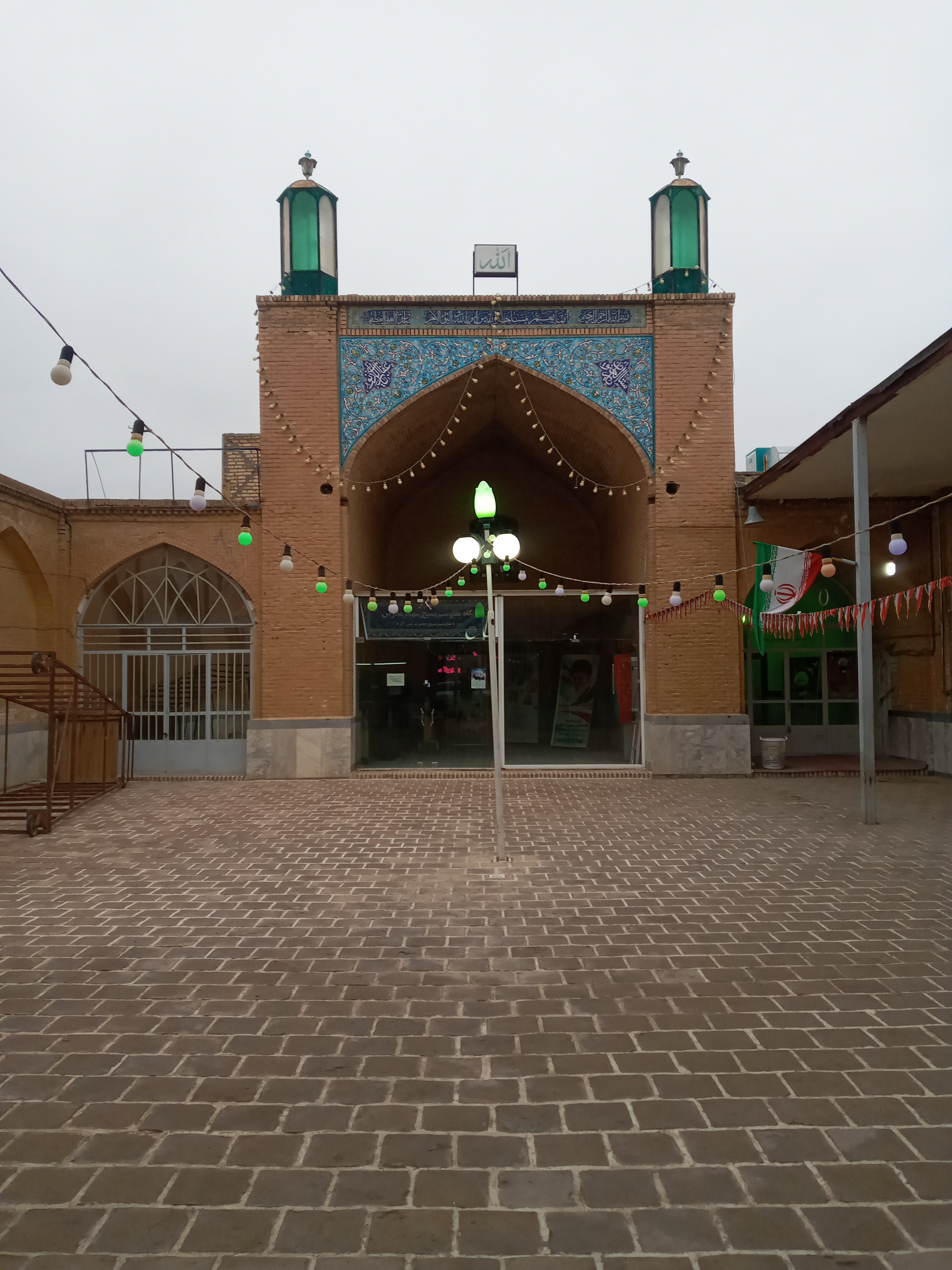
Haji Jalal Mosque in 2021

Media related to Kashmar at Wikimedia Commons

Kashmar travel guide from Wikivoyage
