= Shesh Taraz =

River in Iran

Sesh Taraz
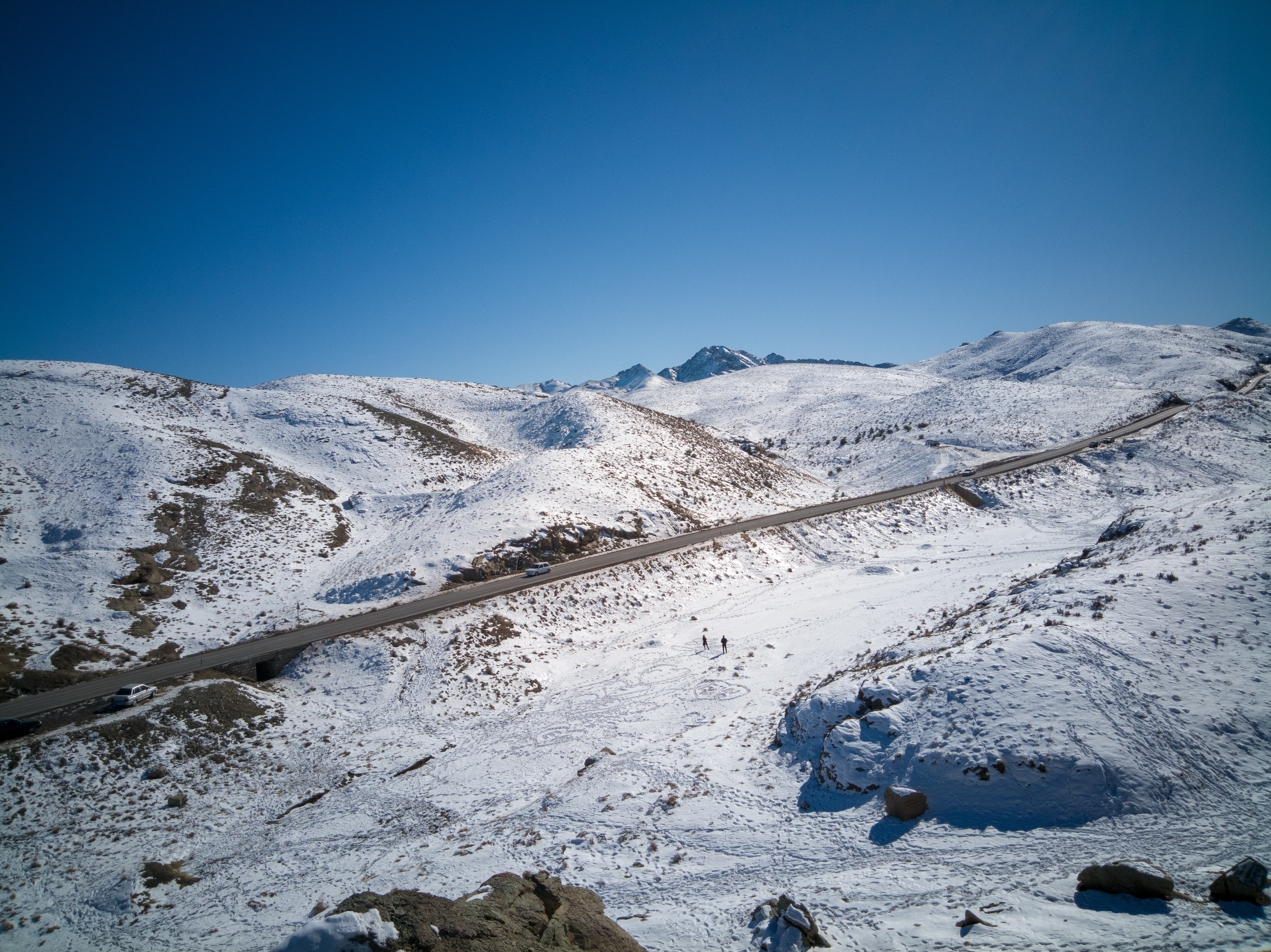
- Rivash route to Kashmar

Physical characteristics
- Source
  - location: Kuhsorkh County, Iran

The Sesh Taraz (Persian: شش‌طراز) is a river in Iran that is more than four million years old. The catchment area of this river in the heights of Rivash is approximately 800 square kilometers.
