= Haji Jalal Mosque =

Mosque in Kashmar, Razavi Khorasan, Iran

- مسجد حاجی جلال
- The mosque in 2023

- Location of the mosque in Iran

Religion
- Affiliation: Shia Islam
- Ecclesiastical or organizational status: Mosque
- Status: Active

Location
- Location: Kashmar, Razavi Khorasan province
- Country: Iran
- Interactive map of Haji Jalal Mosque
- Coordinates: 35°14′3″N 58°27′38″E

Architecture
- Type: Mosque architecture
- Style: Qajar
- Completed: 19th-century Qajar era
- Materials: Bricks; mortar; tiles

Iran National Heritage List
- Official name: Haji Jalal Mosque
- Type: Built
- Designated: 26 June 2005
- Reference no.: 11926
- Conservation organization: Cultural Heritage, Handicrafts and Tourism Organization of Iran

The Haji Jalal Mosque (Persian: مسجد حاجی جلال; Arabic: مسجد حاجي جلال) is a mosque located in Kashmar, in the province of Razavi Khorasan, Iran. The mosque was completed in the 19th century, during the Qajar era and was added to the Iran National Heritage List on 26 June 2005, administered by the Cultural Heritage, Handicrafts and Tourism Organization of Iran.

== See also ==
- Shia Islam in Iran
- List of mosques in Iran
