= List of fire temples in Iran =

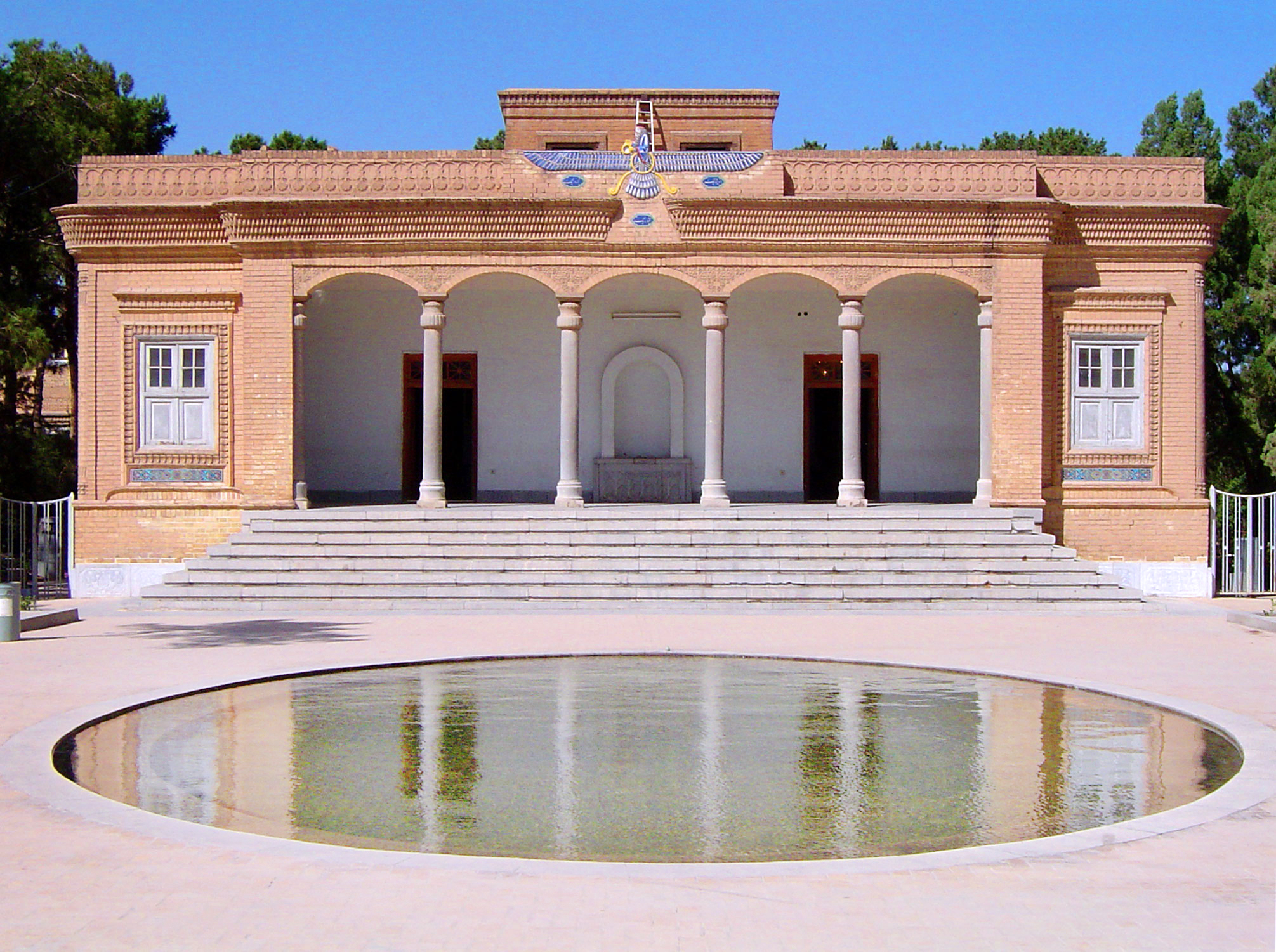
The Fire Temple of Yazd is a Zoroastrian fire temple. It enshrines the Atash Bahram, meaning "Victorious Fire"

A fire temple, Agiary, Atashkadeh (Persian: آتشکده), Atashgah (آتشگاه) or Dar-e Mehr (در مهر) is the place of worship for the followers of Zoroastrianism, the ancient religion of Iran (Persia). In the Zoroastrian religion, fire (see atar), together with clean water (see aban), are agents of ritual purity. Clean, white "ash for the purification ceremonies [is] regarded as the basis of ritual life", which "are essentially the rites proper to the tending of a domestic fire, for the temple [fire] is that of the hearth fire raised to a new solemnity". For, one "who sacrifices unto fire with fuel in his hand ..., is given happiness".

== List of fire temples in Iran ==
Name	Location	Picture	Notes
Adrian	Tehran		The Adrian is a historical Fire Temple belongs to the Qajar dynasty and is located in Tehran County, Tehran province.
Adur Burzen-Mihr (Fire Temple of Kashmar)	Kashmar		Kashmar Fire Temple was the first Zoroastrian fire temple built by Vishtaspa at the request of Zoroaster in Kashmar. In a part of Ferdowsi's Shahnameh, the story of finding Zarathustra and accepting Vishtaspa's religion is regulated that after accepting Zoroastrian religion, Vishtaspa sends priests all over the universe And Azar enters the fire temples (domes) and the first of them is Adur Burzen-Mihr who founded in Kashmar and planted a cypress tree in front of the fire temple and made it a symbol of accepting the Bahi religion And he sent priests all over the world, and commanded all the famous men and women to come to that place of worship. According to the Paikuli inscription, during the Sasanian Empire, Kashmar was part of Greater Khorasan, and the Sasanians worked hard to revive the ancient religion. It still remains a few kilometers above the ancient city of Kashmar in the castle complex of Atashgah.
Adur Farnbag	Larestan County		The Adur Farnbag is a historical Fire Temple belongs to the Sasanian Empire and is located in Larestan County, Fars province. Adur Farnbag was one of the three Atash Behram in Iran at that time.
Adur Gushnasp	West Azerbaijan province		Adur Gushnasp was the name of a Zoroastrian sacred fire of the highest grade (Atash Behram), which served as one of the three most sacred fires of pre-Islamic Iran; the two others being the Adur Farnbag and Adur Burzen-mihr. Out of the three, Adur Gushnasp is the only fire whose temple structure has been discovered and "for which archaeological, sigillographical, and textual evidence are all available."
Espi Mazget	Rezvanshahr County		The Espi Mazget is a historical Fire Temple and Mosque belongs to the Sasanian Empire and is located in Rezvanshahr County, Gilan province.
Fire Temple of Amol	Amol		The Fire Temple of Amol is a temple in Amol, Mazandaran, Iran. It related to the period Sassanid (226- 651 CE) antiquity building. This building has been damaged over time.
Fire Temple of Aspakhu	Bojnord County		The Fire Temple of Aspakhu is a historical Fire Temple belongs to the Sasanian Empire and is located in Bojnord County, North Khorasan province.
Fire Temple of Azar Ju	Darab County		The Fire Temple of Azar Ju is a historical Fire Temple belongs to the Sasanian Empire and is located in Darab County, Fars province.
Fire Temple of Bardneshandeh	Masjed Soleyman County		The Fire Temple of Bardneshandeh is a historical Fire Temple belongs to the Achaemenid Empire and is located in Masjed Soleyman County, Khuzestan province.
Fire Temple of Baze Hoor	Mashhad County		The Fire Temple of Baze Hoor is a historical Fire Temple belongs to the Sasanian Empire and is located in Mashhad County, Razavi Khorasan province.
Fire Temple of Cham Namesht	Darreh Shahr County		The Fire Temple of Cham Namesht is a historical Fire Temple belongs to the Parthian Empire and Sasanian Empire and is located in Darreh Shahr County, Ilam province.
Fire Temple of Farashband	Farashband County		The Fire Temple of Farashband is a historical Fire Temple belongs to the Sasanian Empire and is located in Farashband County, Fars province.
Fire Temple of Fishvar	Evaz County		The Fire Temple of Fishvar is a historical Fire Temple belongs to the Sasanian Empire and is located in Evaz County, Fars province.
Fire Temple of Harpak	Natanz County		The Fire Temple of Harpak is a historical Fire Temple belongs to the Sasanian Empire and is located in Natanz County, Isfahan province.
Fire Temple of Ij	Estahban County		The Fire Temple of Ij is a historical Fire Temple belongs to the Sasanian Empire and is located in Estahban County, Fars province.
Fire Temple of Isfahan	Isfahan		The Fire Temple of Isfahan is a Sassanid-era archaeological complex located on a hill of the same name about eight kilometers west of city center of Isfahan, Iran. The hill, which rises about 210 meters above the surrounding plain, was previously called Maras or Marabin after a village near there, and it is by that name that the site is referred to by Arab historians.
Fire Temple of Izadkhast	Abadeh County		The Fire Temple of Izadkhast is a historical Fire Temple belongs to the Sasanian Empire and is located in Abadeh County, Fars province.
Fire Temple of Jereh	Kazerun County		The Fire Temple of Jereh is a historical Fire Temple belongs to the Sasanian Empire and is located in Kazerun County, Fars province.
Fire Temple of Karkuyeh	Hirmand County		The Fire Temple of Karkuyeh is a historical Fire Temple belongs to the Sasanian Empire and is located in Hirmand County, Sistan and Baluchestan province.
Fire Temple of Kazerun	Kazerun		The Fire Temple of Kazerun is a historical Fire Temple belongs to the Sasanian Empire and is located in Kazerun County, Fars province.
Fire Temple of Kerman	Kerman County		The Fire Temple of Kerman is a Fire Temple belongs to the Pahlavi dynasty and is located in Kerman County, Kerman province.
Fire Temple of Khaneh Div	Davarzan County		The Fire Temple of Khaneh Div is a historical Fire Temple belongs to the Parthian Empire and Sasanian Empire and is located in Davarzan County, Razavi Khorasan province.
Fire Temple of Kheyrabad	Gachsaran County		The Fire Temple of Kheyrabad is a historical Fire Temple belongs to the Sasanian Empire and is located in Gachsaran County, Kohgiluyeh and Boyer-Ahmad province.
Fire Temple of Konar Siah	Firuzabad County		The Fire Temple of Konar Siah is a historical Fire Temple belongs to the Sasanian Empire and is located in Firuzabad County, Razavi Khorasan province.
Fire Temple of Kusan	Behshahr County		The Fire Temple of Kusan is a historical Fire Temple belongs to the Early centuries of historical periods after Islam and is located in Behshahr County, Mazandaran province.
Fire Temple of Mil Azhdeha	Mamasani County		The Fire Temple of Mil Azhdeha is a historical Fire Temple belongs to the Parthian Empire and is located in Mamasani County, Fars province.
Fire Temple of Mil Milgeh	Eslamabad-e Gharb		The Fire Temple of Mil Milgeh is a historical Fire Temple belongs to the Sasanian Empire and is located in Eslamabad-e Gharb, Kermanshah province.
Fire Temple of Nagharekhaneh	Farashband County		The Fire Temple of Nagharekhaneh is a historical Fire Temple belongs to the Sasanian Empire and is located in Farashband County, Fars province.
Fire Temple of Natanz	Natanz County		The Fire Temple of Natanz is a historical Fire Temple belongs to the Sasanian Empire and is located in Natanz County, Isfahan province.
Fire Temple of Neyasar	Kashan County		The Fire Temple of Neyasar is a historical Fire Temple belongs to the Sasanian Empire and is located in Kashan County, Fars province.
Fire Temple of Qotbabad	Jahrom County		The Fire Temple of Qotbabad is a historical Fire Temple belongs to the Sasanian Empire and is located in Jahrom County, Fars province.
Fire Temple of Shiyan	Eslamabad-e Gharb County		The Fire Temple of Shiyan is a historical Fire Temple belongs to the Sasanian Empire and is located in Eslamabad-e Gharb County, Kermanshah province.
Fire Temple of Siah Gol	Eyvan County		The Fire Temple of Siah Gol is a historical Fire Temple belongs to the Sasanian Empire and is located in Eyvan County, Ilam province.
Fire Temple of Takht-e Rostam	Shahriar County		The Fire Temple of Takht-e Rostam is a historical Fire Temple belongs to the Sasanian Empire and is located in Shahriar County, Tehran province.
Fire Temple of Tashvir	Tarom County		The Fire Temple of Tashvir is a historical Fire Temple belongs to the Sasanian Empire and is located in Tarom County, Zanjan province.
Fire Temple of Yazd	Yazd		The Fire Temple of Yazd is a Zoroastrian fire temple in Yazd, Yazd province, Iran. It enshrines the Atash Bahram, meaning "Victorious Fire", dated to 470 AD. It is one of the nine Atash Bahrams, the only one of the highest grade fire in ancient Iran where Zoroastrians have practiced their religion since 400 BC; the other eight Atash Bahrams are in India. According to Aga Rustam Noshiravan Belivani, of Sharifabad, the Anjuman-i Nasiri (elected Zoroastrian officials) opened the Yazd Atash Behram in the 1960s to non-Zoroastrian visitors.
Noushijan (Fire Temple of Noushijan)	Malayer		The Fire Temple of Noushijan is a historical Fire Temple belongs to the Medes and is located in Malayer County, Hamadan province.
Tarikhaneh	Damghan		This 2,300-year-old structure was initially used as a Zoroastrian Fire Temple during the Sassanid period, however, after the fall of the Sassanid Empire it was converted into a mosque, in the 8th century. The monument is, thus, known as the oldest mosque in Iran.
Temple of Khvorheh	Mahallat County		The Temple of Khvorheh is a historical Temple belongs to the Seleucid Empire and is located in Mahallat County, Markazi province.
Temple of Mehr	Maragheh County		The Temple of Mehr is a historical Temple belongs to the Prehistory and is located in Maragheh County, East Azerbaijan province.
Temple of Mehri	Maragheh County		The Temple of Mehri is a historical Temple belongs to the Parthian Empire and Sasanian Empire and is located in Maragheh County, East Azerbaijan province.
Temple of Sorkh Dom Luri	Kuhdasht County		The Temple of Sorkh Dom Luri is a historical Temple belongs to the Bronze Age and is located in Kuhdasht County, Lorestan province.

== See also ==
- List of fire temples in India

== Bibliography ==
- Boyce, Mary (1975), The History of Zoroastrianism, vol. 1, Leiden: Brill, ISBN 978-90-04-10474-7, (repr. 1996)
- Kia, Mehrdad (2016). The Persian Empire: A Historical Encyclopedia [2 volumes]: A Historical Encyclopedia. ABC-CLIO. ISBN 978-1610693912.
- Potts, Daniel; Canepa, Matthew (2018). "fires of Iran, great". In Nicholson, Oliver (ed.). The Oxford Dictionary of Late Antiquity. Oxford: Oxford University Press. ISBN 978-0-19-866277-8.
- Rogerson, Barnaby (7 November 2013). Rogerson's Book of Numbers: The culture of numbers from 1001 Nights to the Seven Wonders of the World. Profile Books. ISBN 978-1-84765-983-5.
