= Sangan Zarbin Cupressus =

Sangan Zarbin Cupressus is a 3,212-year-old cypress tree located in Sistan and Baluchestan province, 45 km from Khash city with a height of about 30 meters and a trunk diameter of 3 meters. This cypress tree is registered as one of the national natural monuments of Iran and the life of it is estimated to be about 2000 years.

Cypress trees were sacred to Zoroastrians and were mostly planted by Mobads (Zoroastrian priests). For this reason, after Islam, the people of the region named it the Mir Omar tree, to preserve it, and it was later called Sol.

== See also ==
- Cypress of Kashmar
- Sarv-e Abarkuh- An old tree in the city of Abarkuh, Yazd, which is estimated to be nearly 4,000 years old.
- Rahmat tree- An old sycamore tree in the city of Kermanshah, which is estimated to be more than 700 years old.
