= Torshiz =

Medieval city in Iran

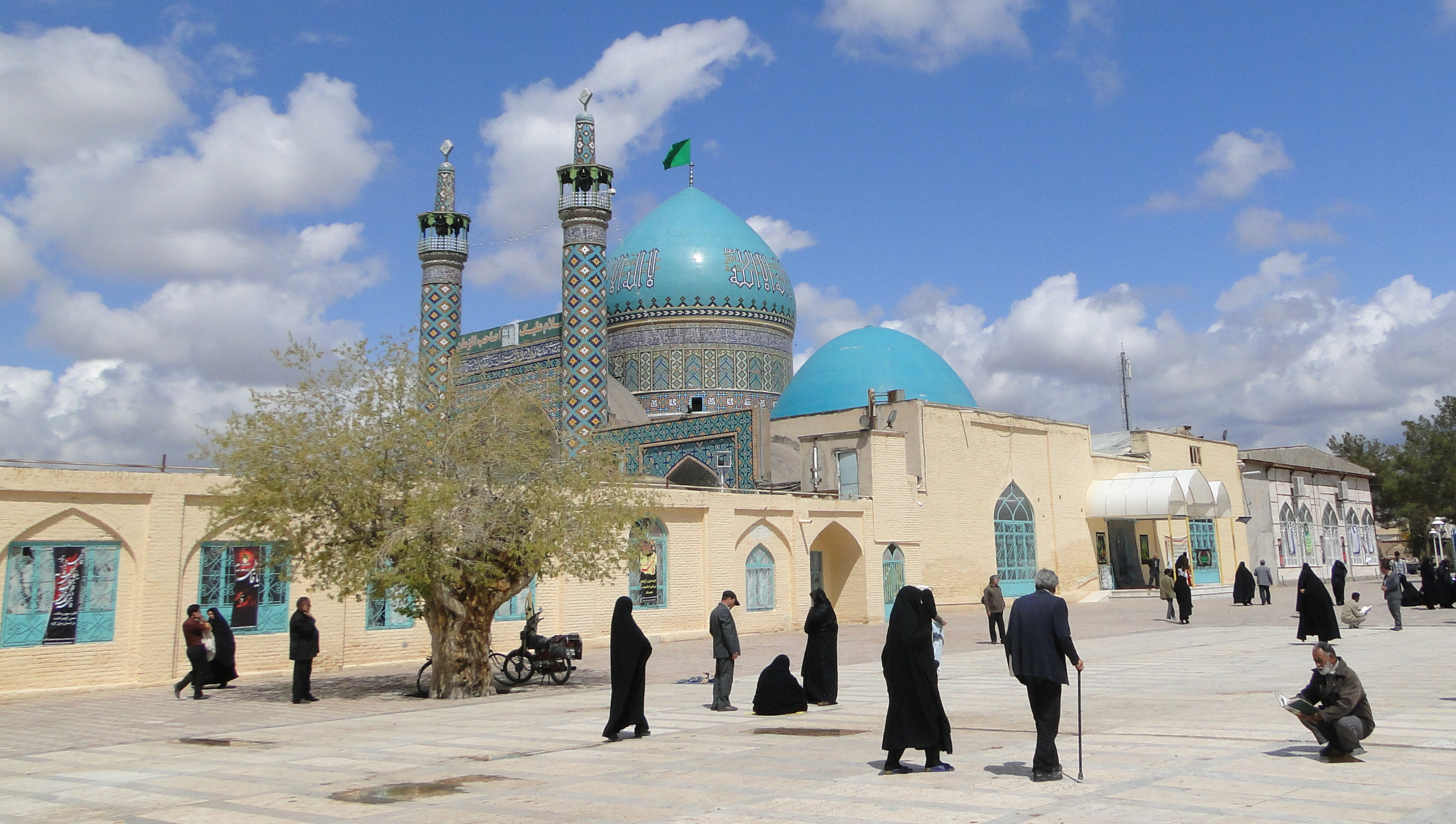
Imamzadeh Hamzeh, Kashmar of the remnants of the Safavid era.

Turshiz, (Note: Persian: ترشیز, romanized: Turshez, pronounced [turˈʃeːz], Iranian Persian: [tʰoɹˈʃiːz]) also known as Turaythith, (Note: Persian: طریثیث, romanized: Turaysīs) is a medieval district and city of the Quhistan region. It corresponds to the Kashmar area, located in the present-day Razavi Khorasan Province, Iran. This region is divided into four regions Kashmar County, Kuhsorkh County, Khalilabad County and Bardaskan County.

== Gallery ==
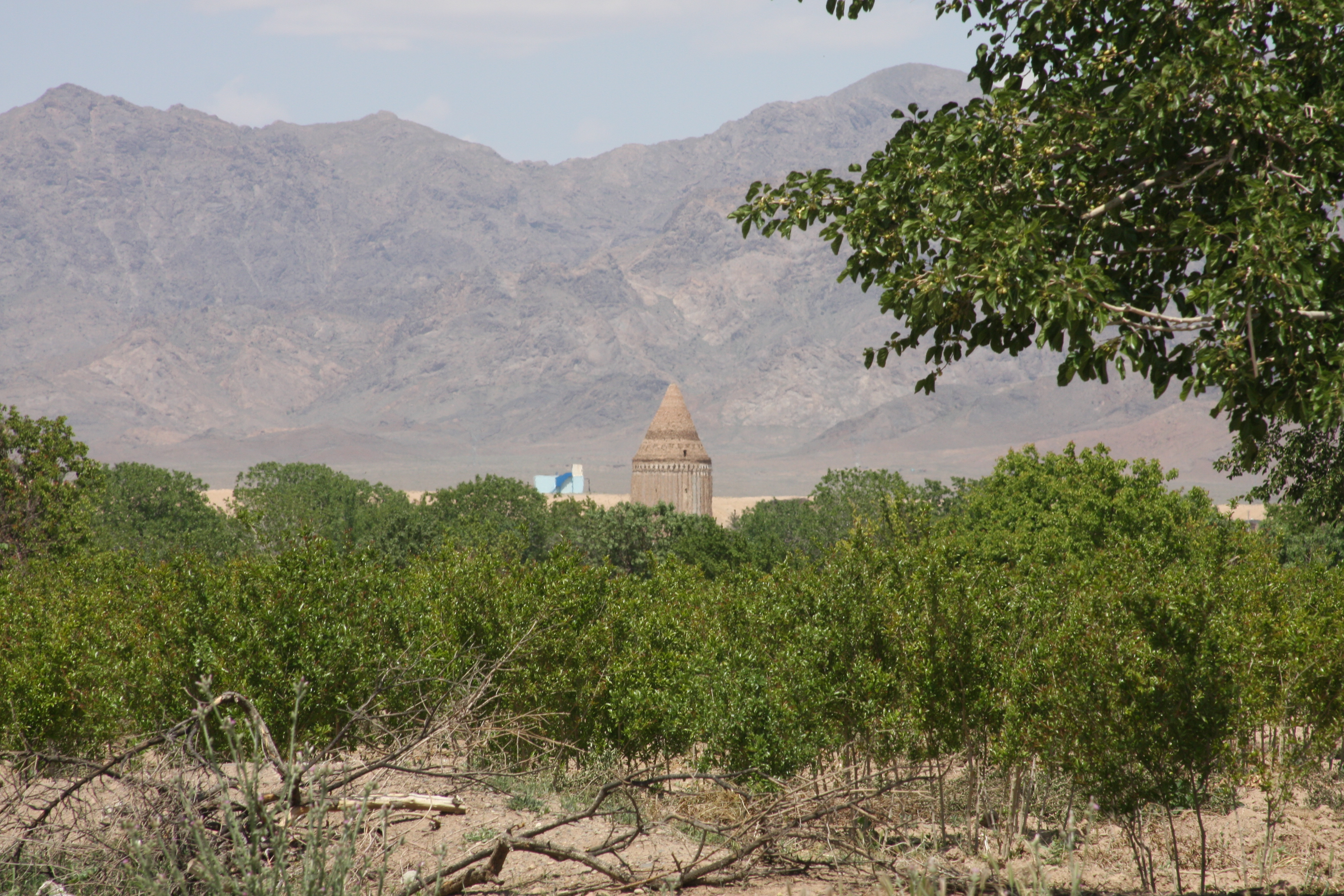
Aliabad Tower

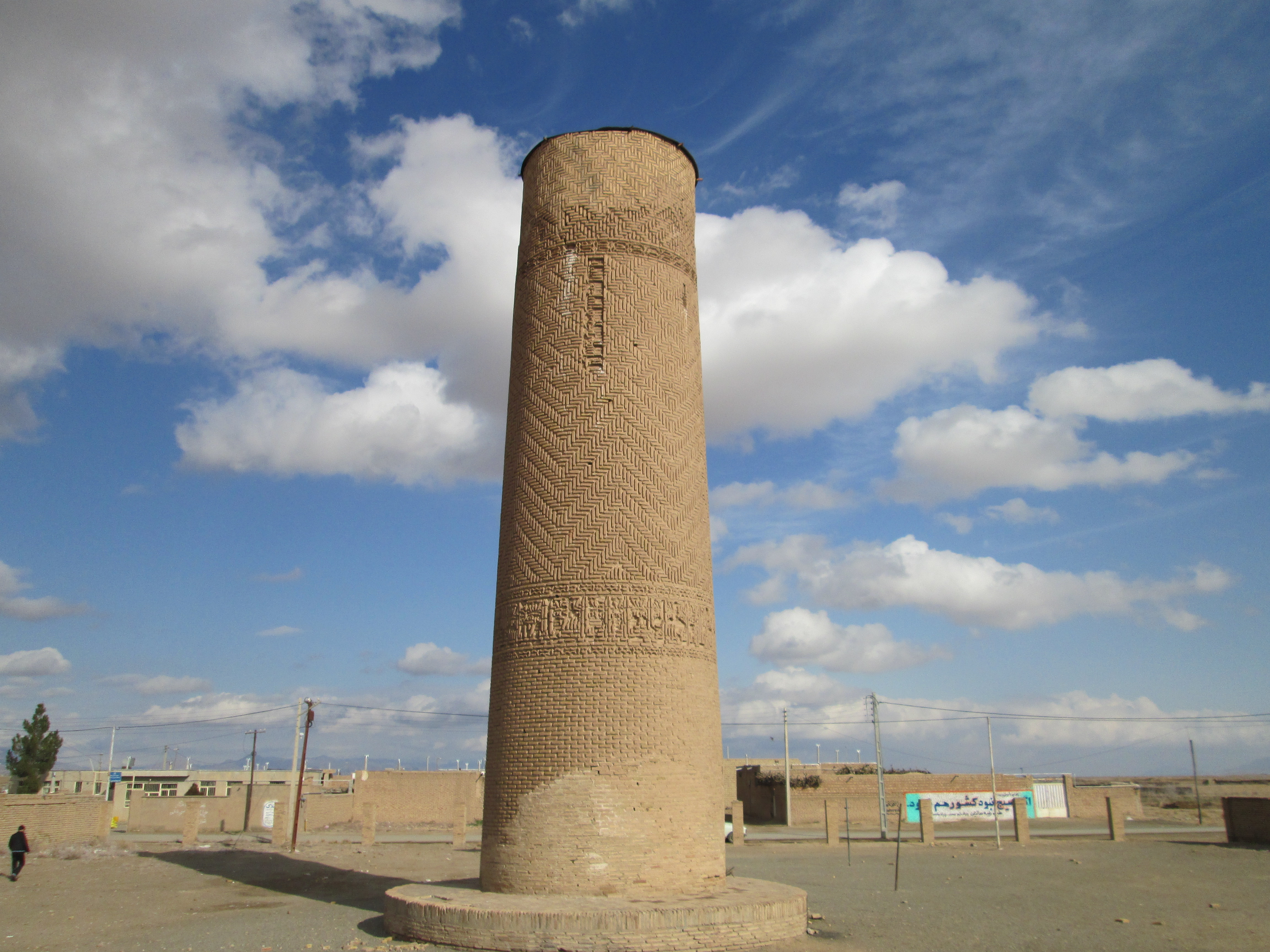
Firuzabad Tower

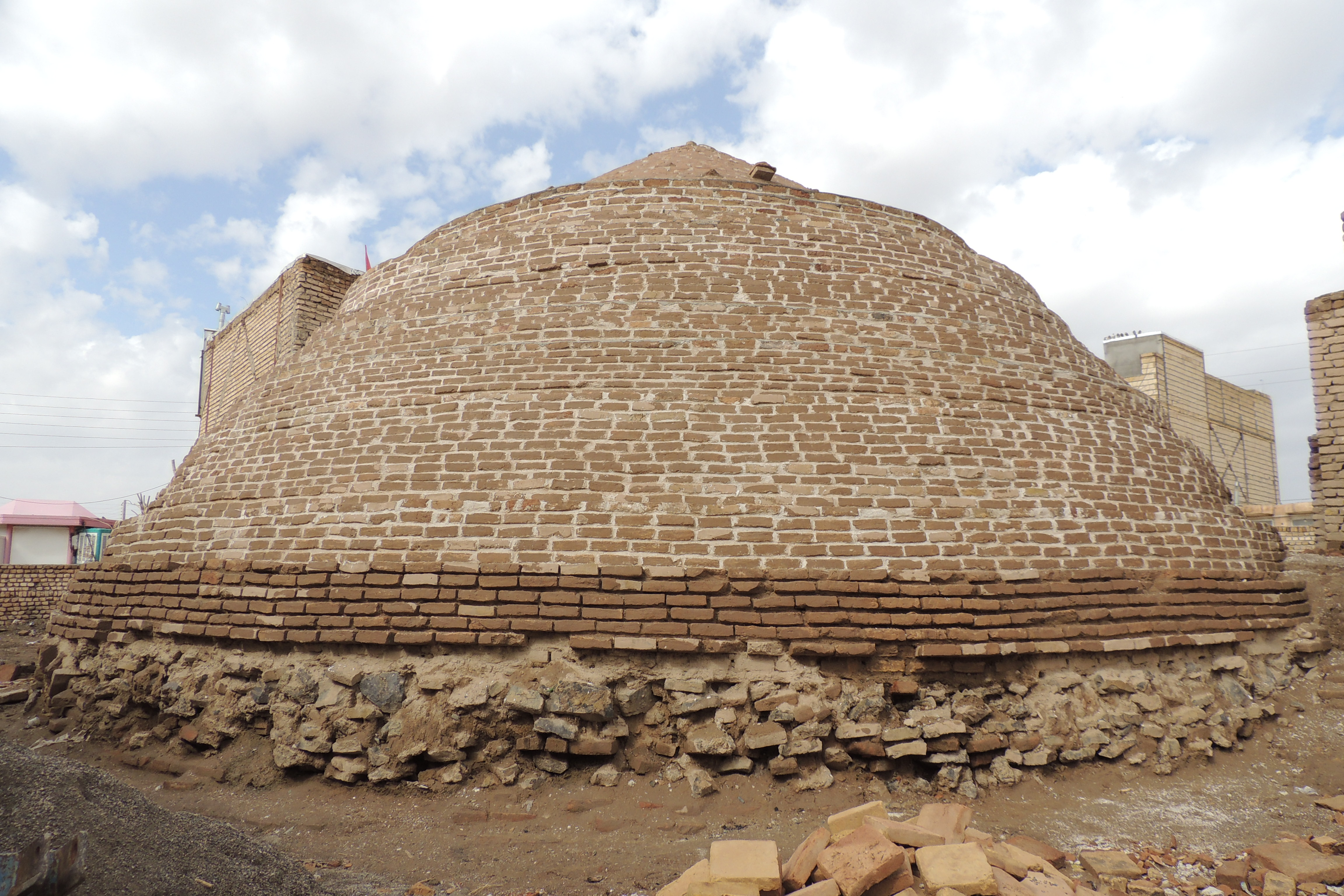
Kondor Ab anbar 2

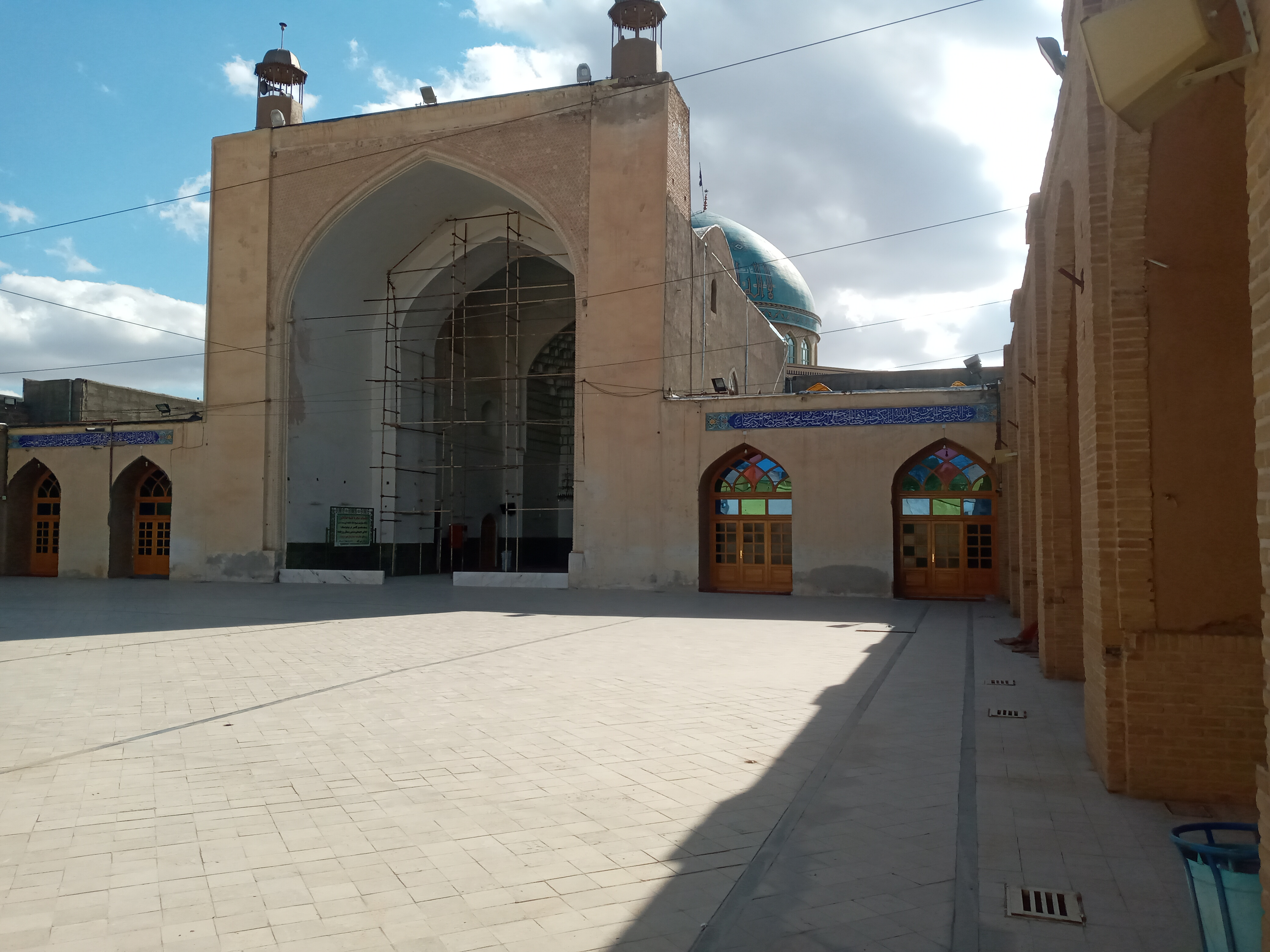
Jameh Mosque of Kashmar

Haji Jalal Mosque

Atashgah Castle

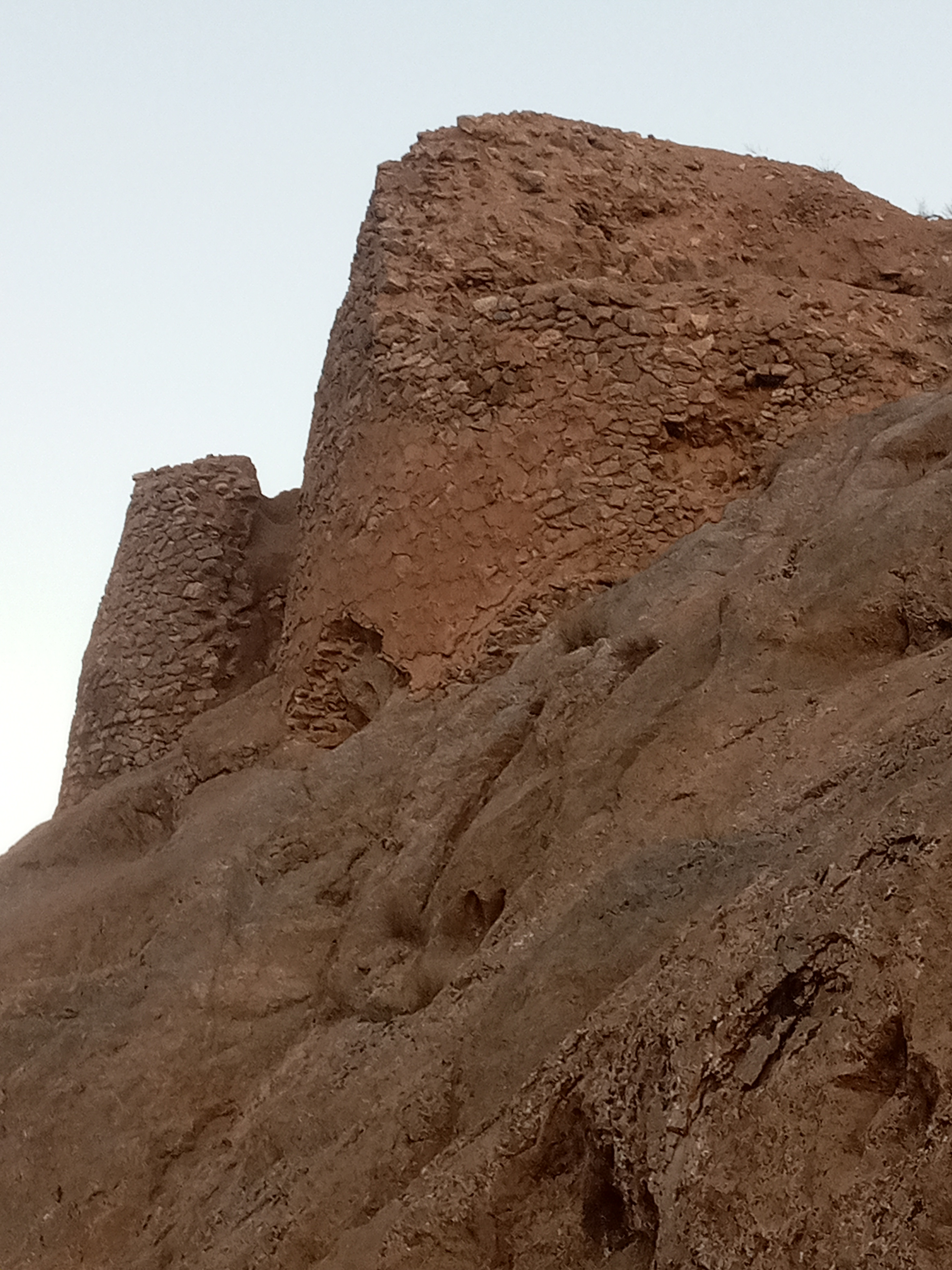
Qal'eh Dokhtar, Kuhsorkh

== See also ==
- Adur Burzen-Mihr
- Cypress of Kashmar
- Kashmar
