= Women in Zoroastrianism =

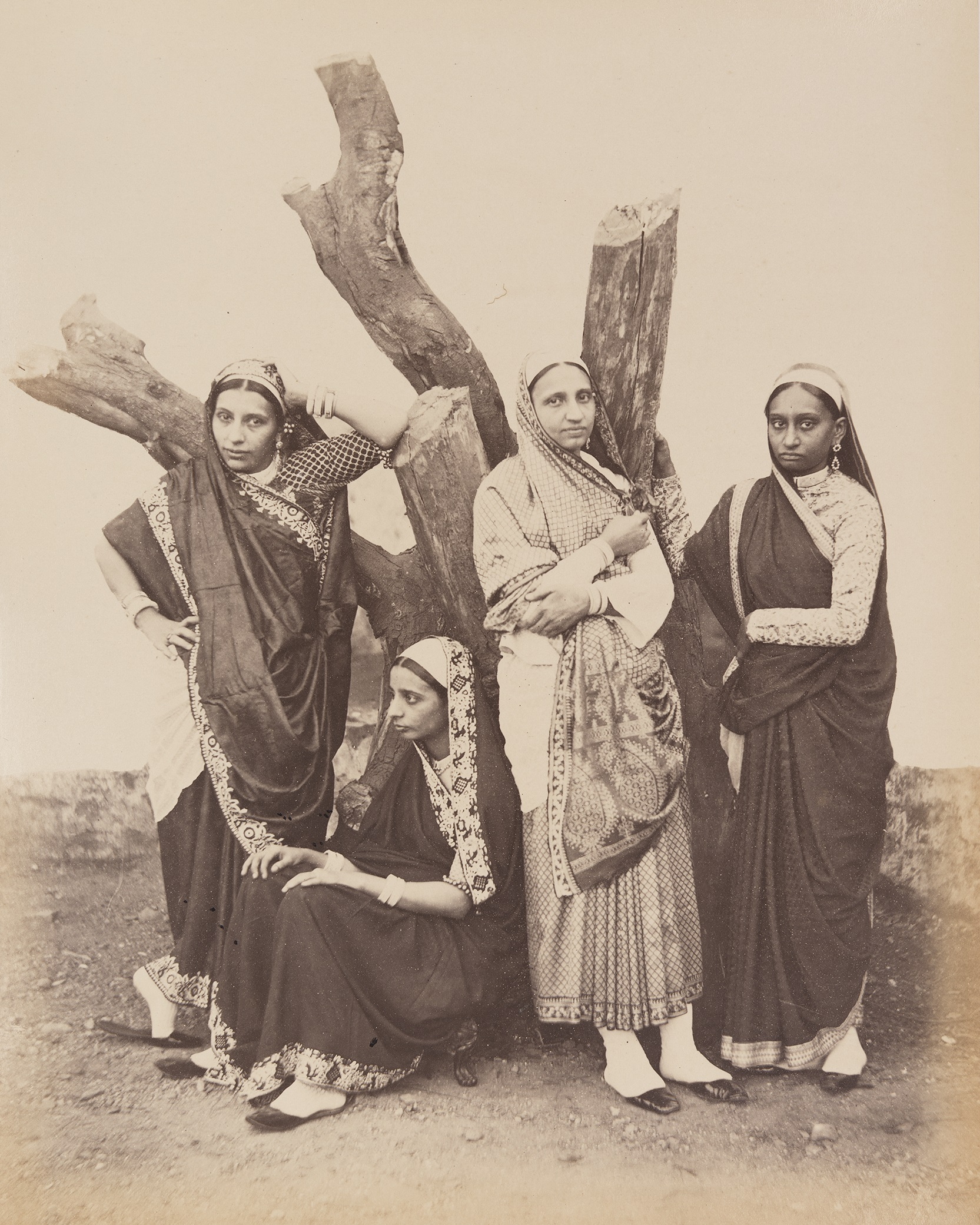
A group of Zoroastrian (Parsi) women in western India, circa 1855

Since its inception, Zoroastrianism has recognized total spiritual equality between women and men. The spiritual founder of Zoroastrianism, the eponymous Zoroaster, explicitly addressed both men and women, and affirmed that individuals of either gender could be righteous and could achieve salvation, an apparent innovation compared to the preceding polytheistic Iranian faiths.

Evidence suggests women could occupy priestly roles in early Zoroastrianism, though the priesthood has for most of history been exclusive to men, who have thus historically dominated religious doctrine and decision-making. Although not distinguished from men in a spiritual sense, Zoroastrian texts written after the oldest parts of the sacred Avesta (such as the Vendidad) introduced additional teachings and restrictions regarding women, particularly concerning ritual purity. In the medieval period, Zoroastrian theology and religious practice became increasingly male-oriented and conservative, to the detriment of women, probably reflecting changing social attitudes of the time. The degree to which later Zoroastrians accepted and weighted teachings and regulations for women that postdate Zoroaster himself varies.

== Women in the Avesta ==
=== Equality ===
The Avesta advocates spiritual gender equality and recognizes women as "men's partners in the common struggle against evil", with religious and moral agency equal to men. An egalitarian message is further apparent through the use of inclusive formulae in various passages. The Yasna Haptanghaiti collocates the words nar- (man) and nāirī- (woman) four times, twice in the expression nā vā nāirī vā ("a man or a woman") and twice in the form narąmcā nāirinąmcā ("of men and women"). The Gathas also combine the two, at points referencing iθā ... narō aθā jə̄naiiō ("thus ... men, so also women"). In FrD.3, a Younger Avestan fragment, both men and women are cautioned: "He has not won anything who has not won (anything) for his soul. She has not won anything who has not won (anything) for her soul." Avestan texts frequently praise and venerate righteous adherents of the faith, regardless of gender, for instance in Y. 39.2 ("and we worship now the souls of truthful men and women, wherever they may have been born") and Y. 37.3 ("we worship in the choices of the truthful ones—of men and of women").

Zoroastrians are initiated through investiture of the sedreh (ritual shirt) and kushti (ritual girdle), a ceremony that is undertaken for both boys and girls. The Vendidad declares that it is sinful for a man or woman older than 15 to not wear the sedreh. It is clear in the Avesta that women, like men, can receive religious education. Y. 26.7 refers to the choices "of teachers, of students—male [and] female". Vr. 3.4 and Gāh 4.9 mention "well educated" women. The Hērbedestān states that those eligible to receive education for aθauruna ("priestly service") include both the lady (nāirikā-) and lord of the house (nmānō.paiti-), the one chosen being the one with the "highest esteem for truth" and who is the one less needed to manage the household. Like men, women are expected to spread Zoroastrian teachings: Y. 35.6 states that "a man or a woman" who "knows what is real" and "what is really good" should "make this known to those who will thus practice it". The Avesta does not exclude women from participating in rituals or sacrificial rites. Y. 41.2 endorses rule by both men and women: "May a good ruler, a man or a woman, rule us, in both existences"; women are thus presented as capable of being good leaders in both a material and spiritual sense.

=== Differential treatment ===
Some parts of the Avesta emphasize the ritual impurity experienced by women during menstruation (see the "Purity and menstruation" section below), and certain regulations and rituals that need to be followed during menstruation. A woman who experienced a stillbirth is described as especially impure in the Vendidad, which states that the community must "build and enclosure" for her where she is to remain for three nights, during which she should wash her body and clothes with cow urine and water by the nine holes". She is then to be secluded for a further nine nights before she can re-enter society. Some religious scholars have criticized such rituals as "humiliating" and as causing "psychological distress". Menstruation-related purity theology is not found in the Gathas, the oldest parts of the Avesta (and the only parts attributed to Zoroaster himself). The Vendidad also includes some purity laws specific to men, for example in the event of nocturnal emission; men are in that case also implored to undergo ritual purification.

Except for purity laws, the only Avestan passage that references differential treatment of women and men is also in the Vendidad. Vendidad 7.41-22 stipulates that a physician healing a patient can charge more money for healing men than for healing women.

== Gendered concepts of the divine ==
=== Divinities ===
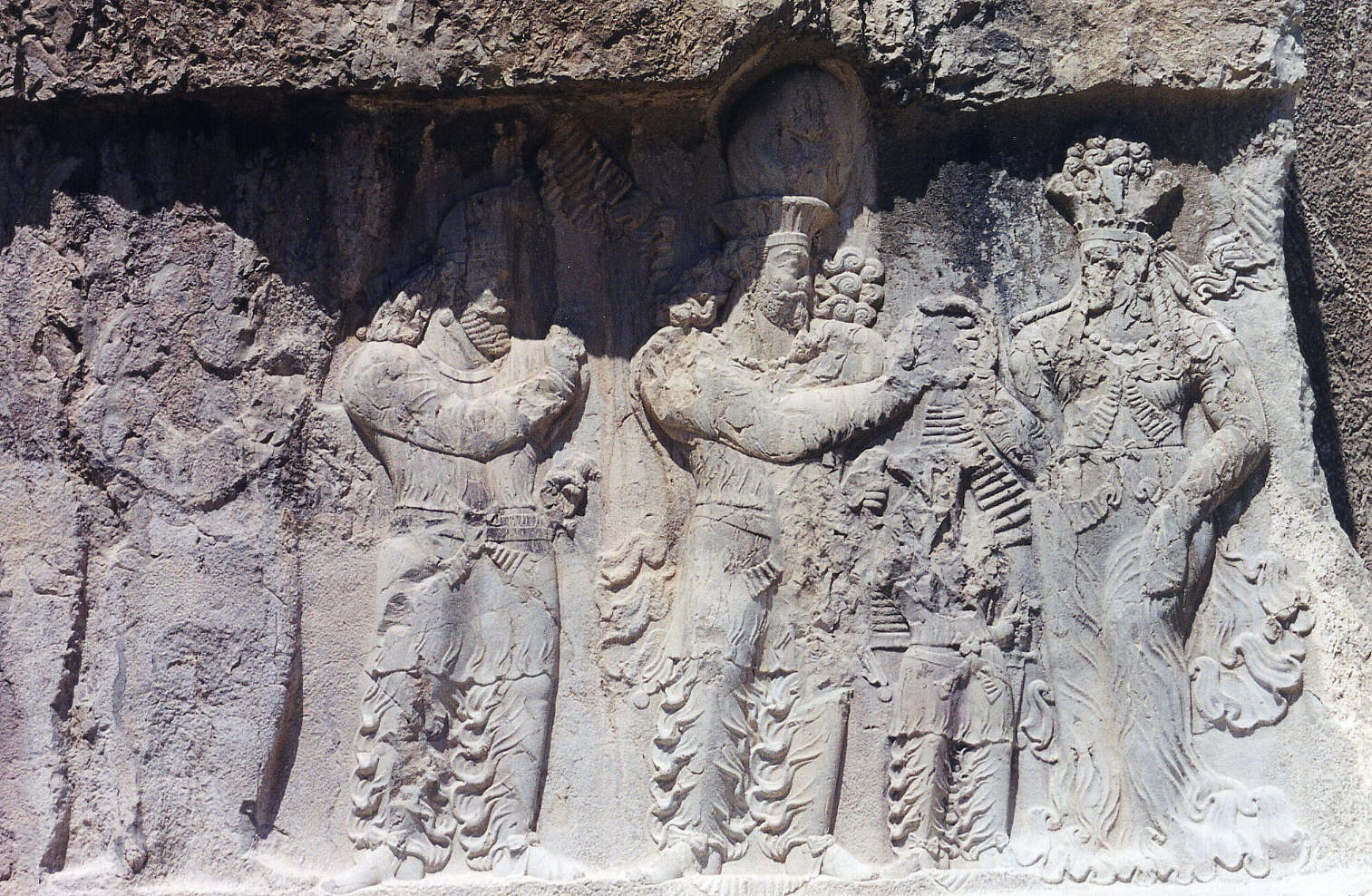
Depicting of the investiture of the Sasanian king Narseh (r. 293–303). The king is depicted as receiving the ring of kingship from the female divinity Anahita.

The supreme deity of Zoroastrianism, Ahura Mazda, is an explicitly male figure and is referenced with masculine language. Ahura Mazda's first act is stated to have been to bring into being the Amesha Spentas, six lesser divinities (yazatas) that aid in the struggle against evil. These indicate some sort of equality between the masculine and the feminine in the cosmology, since three are male and three are female. These divinities never act as earthly men and women, since they do not marry and do not produce further offspring. Each Amesha Spenta protects one part of the material world against Angra Mainyu. Worship of all Amesha Spentas is encouraged in the Zoroastrian scriptures.

There is no specific hierarchy among the Amesha Spentas in the original scriptures, though the masculine divinities appear more frequently in Younger Avestan listings. There is evidence that Zoroastrian theology grew more conservative and male-oriented in the medieval Middle Persian/Pahlavi texts. Female divinities appear less frequently in these and in one Middle Persian classification of cosmic elements, those associated with the masculine (sky, metal, wind, and fire) appear before those associated with the feminine (water, earth, and plants). Middle Persian literature likewise appears to assign the protection of men to the masculine divinities and the protection of women to the feminine ones.

The feminine Zoroastrian divinities are neither passive nor defined by traditional female social roles. Something akin to such a role only applies to one of the divinities, Spenta Armaiti, who is represented as a pious and obedient daughter of Ahura Mazda, a "mother of all" and a "queen of paradise" who purifies the wombs of women after birth and is therefore critical to the continued existence of humanity. The Amesha Spenta associated with water, Haurvatat, is often described with epithets such as sūrā ("strong") and anāhitā ("undefiled") and is credited with bestowing fertility on both women and men, and increasing fields, crops, herds, and possessions. As Anahita, Haurvatat has historically also been venerated as a warrior who brought victory to Iran and its soldiers. She was likened to a "Persian Artemis" in Parthian (247 BCE–224 CE) times and her cult gained special recognition in the Sasanian period (224–651). Sasanian kings were crowned in Anahita's temple in Istakhr and the heads of defeated enemies were reportedly sent to this temple.

=== Demons ===
A majority of demons (daevas) in Zoroastrian texts are male, though female demons also appear. Pollution of dead matter is for instance attributed to the female Nasu and the beginning of menstruation is the fault of the female Jahi. In Middle Persian texts, Jahu came to personify the "pollution of menstruation" and be regarded as the embodiment of "uncontrolled female sexuality" and thus the opponent of all virtuous women. Female demons are generally depicted as unrestrained, deceptive, and disobedient.

== Women in Zoroastrian history ==
=== Ancient history ===
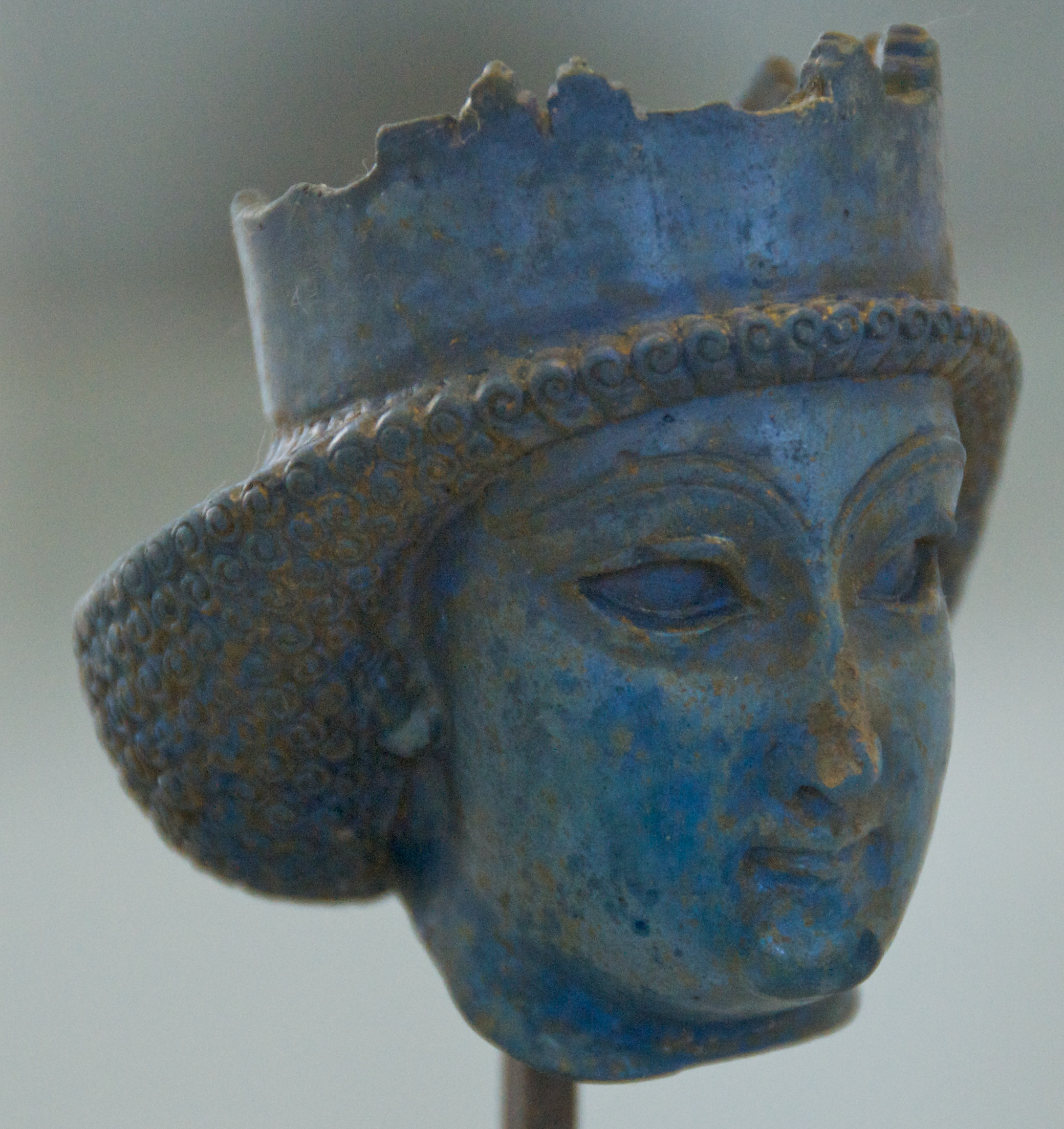
Head of an Achaemenid woman (or beardless man)

Zoroastrianism was founded by the eponymous religious reformer Zoroaster, who was born into a polytheistic culture in ancient Iran. The timeframe of Zoroaster's life and the religion's foundation is disputed, with estimates varying wildly from around 2000 BCE to around 500 BCE. Zoroastrianism was established as the main religion of modern-day Iran and Iraq, a role Zoroastrianism maintained until the fall of the Sasanian Empire in 651 CE and the rise of Islam.

Zoroastrianism was significantly more gender-inclusive in its teachings than the earlier polytheistic religions practiced in Iran. One prominent example is Zoroaster's teachings concerning the afterlife. Whereas paradise had previously been a domain for men with the means of achieving it, Zoroaster proclaimed: "man or woman ... whomever I shall impel to your invocation, with all these shall I cross the Bridge of the Separator". The promise of salvation regardless of gender, and Zoroaster explicitly addressing "man and woman" shows that Zoroastrianism recognized an equality between men and women in a religious sense since its inception, though they may occupy different social roles. Zoroastrian veneration extended to the fravashi (spirits) of both great men and women; the inclusion of women appears to have been a specific and new Zoroastrian conception. The Fravardin Yasht of the Avesta lists numerous fravashi worthy of veneration, including many women. The existence of both righteous men and women, and affirmation that women could serve as good rulers, is presented in Zoroaster's teachings.

Because Ahura Mazda was described as having created both men and women to fight against evil, the initial stages of Zoroastrianism appears to have reflected some egalitarian ideals. Such ideals were not completely reflected in everyday religious practice or in doctrine, since ancient Iran was a male-dominated society and continued to be so as Zoroastrianism flourished. The Zoroastrian priesthood appears to have been all-male since the earliest times. There is however some evidence that women under certain circumstances were considered fit to officiate minor priestly duties or otherwise serve as religious functionaries. A handful of sources prove that the Zoroastrian cult of Anahita had priestesses.

In the Achaemenid Empire (550–330 BCE), noble women were educated, participated in ceremonies, and exercised some political power. Women independently managed and owned estates throughout the empire. Records establish that owners of the estates, both male and female, gave equal rations to both male and female workers. Female workers who headed work crews or were new mothers were given special rations. Achaemenid kings practiced marriage to relatives and polygamy, but it is unclear if these practices were also common among the general Zoroastrian population. Greek sources from the Hellenistic period attribute such practices to Iranians in general. There are no passages in the sacred Zoroastrian texts that directly address polygamy.

=== Sasanian Empire ===
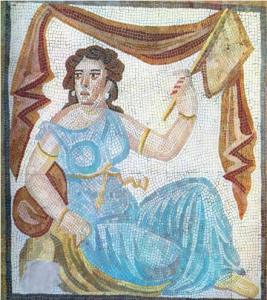
Mosaic of an Iranian noblewoman, made by Roman craftsmen captured by the Sasanian king Shapur I

In the Sasanian Empire, Zoroastrianism was for the first time institutionalized as the official state religion. Sasanian Zoroastrianism was predominantly patriarchal. The empire organized a powerful and official priesthood with hereditary offices, though it was composed exclusively of men. Men enjoyed considerable social advantages over women in the Sasanian Empire.

These social structures were not necessarily Zoroastrian per se and the generally recognized equal spiritual standing of women in Zoroastrianism must be distinguished from their lesser standing in the Sasanian legal system. Sasanian law and domestic politics was however justified by moral standards established by the priesthood through their interpretation of the sacred Zoroastrian texts.

Women in the Sasanian Empire still enjoyed certain rights, especially among the upper classes. They were for instance allowed to act as witnesses (and sometimes judges) in courts of law. Upper-class women also controlled their own finances and enjoyed the services of male assistants. Veiling and seclusion of women was practiced in the Sasanian Empire, though only among high-ranking women in the aristocracy. Royal men were in a similar way also hidden from the public eye. A patriarchal descent system was employed in the empire, which often left women out of official and family genealogies. Women were generally expected to submit to the male guardians in their lives and tend to domestic duties. Their main duty was to produce children. Some religious texts of the time do not distinguish between women and slaves.

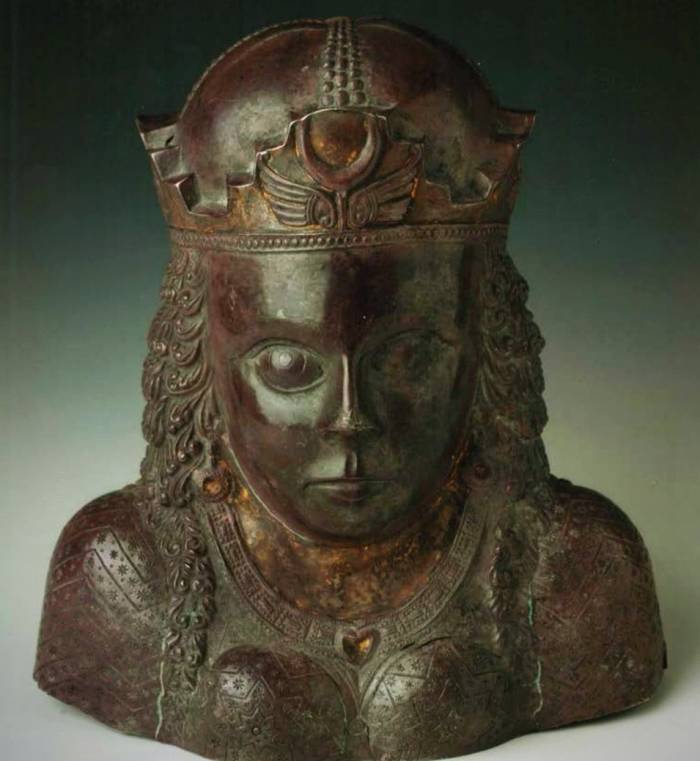
Bust of a Sasanian queen

The consort of the Sasanian ruler (the shāhanshāh, "king of kings") was crowned as bānbishnān bānbishn ("queen of queens"). Her main duty was to preside over the women's section of the imperial palace. Zoroastrianism in the Sasanian Empire evidently allowed for female rule: the empire was towards its end twice ruled by women, under the ruling queens Boran (r. 630, 631–632) and Azarmidokht (r. 630–631). Although their accession had only been possible due to the elimination of all possible male claimants, there is no record of any overt religious opposition to their rule. Boran's coinage claims divine endorsement for her rule, stating that the queen "originated" from the gods and would restore Sasanian power.

The Sasanian Empire had a strict class system, which ensured that marriage only took place within one's social class. Polygamy was allowed and legal texts make it clear that it was practiced, though it is unclear how normative or widespread it was. The poorer elements of Sasanian society are believed to have been mostly monogamous. It was normal for fathers to arrange marriages for their daughters once they reached the age of 15. The girl was consulted in the choice of husband and matches could be rejected. Women could also step out of societal constraints and marry out of love, which was unconventional but not uncommon. Divorce was usually an agreement between both parties, though it could be initiated by husbands in particular on various grounds, including moral misconduct, disobedience, and accusations of sorcery. Men were further allowed to take concubines from among their female slaves. Children from such unions were raised as family members, though continued to be considered slaves.

=== Medieval period ===
Following the Muslim conquest of Iran, Zoroastrianism gradually transitioned from a powerful state religion into a (often victimized) minority religion. During this process, Zoroastrianism adopted an increasingly patriarchal worldview. Evidence that Zoroastrian theology became more male-oriented and conservative is found in several medieval Middle Persian/Pahlavi texts. Negative portrayals of women are far more common in the Pahlavi literature than they are in earlier Zoroastrian texts, seemingly reflecting changing social attitudes of the time. One extreme example of these developments is a passage in the Middle Persian Bundahishn, where Ahura Mazda (here called Ohrmazd) declares that women were created solely for their childbearing ability, though would never have been created in the first place if Ohrmazd could have found an alternative way to generate men.

It was not conceivable for Zoroastrian women in the Middle Ages to have any education. Although afforded some liberties, they were by and large dependent individuals with little legal capacity of their own. In effect, wives were the property of their husbands. Zoroastrian texts from the Middle Ages mention that marriage could be dissolved at the initiation of either the husband or the wife. Usually, both had to agree to a divorce but the wife's agreement was unnecessary if she was guilty of adultery or was infertile. There were only four legitimate reasons why a man could divorce: adultery, sterility, practice of sorcery, or concealment that the wife was menstruating. Wives were not allowed to divorce their husbands on the ground that their husband was impotent.

Most medieval Zoroastrian laws regulating women find their justification in that women menstruate and can thus be considered a source of pollution and thus a cause of evil in the material world (see the section "Purity and menstruation" below). This could in turn be interpreted as making women inferior, sinful, and evil. The medieval period saw significant elaboration of menstruation-related taboos and rituals. Women came to be generally regarded as divinely created yet periodically polluted, easily tempted, and untrustworthy.

These altereted attitudes presented some religious problems since they appeared to conflict with the apparent equality once preached by Zoroaster. There was thus some flexibility and opportunity afforded to women in their religious and societal roles. Women could officiate at minor ceremonies, own property, and act as guardians of their families when no living man was able to fulfill that role. Women could even hold political office if a Zoroastrian noble had no male children.

=== Modern period ===
==== India ====
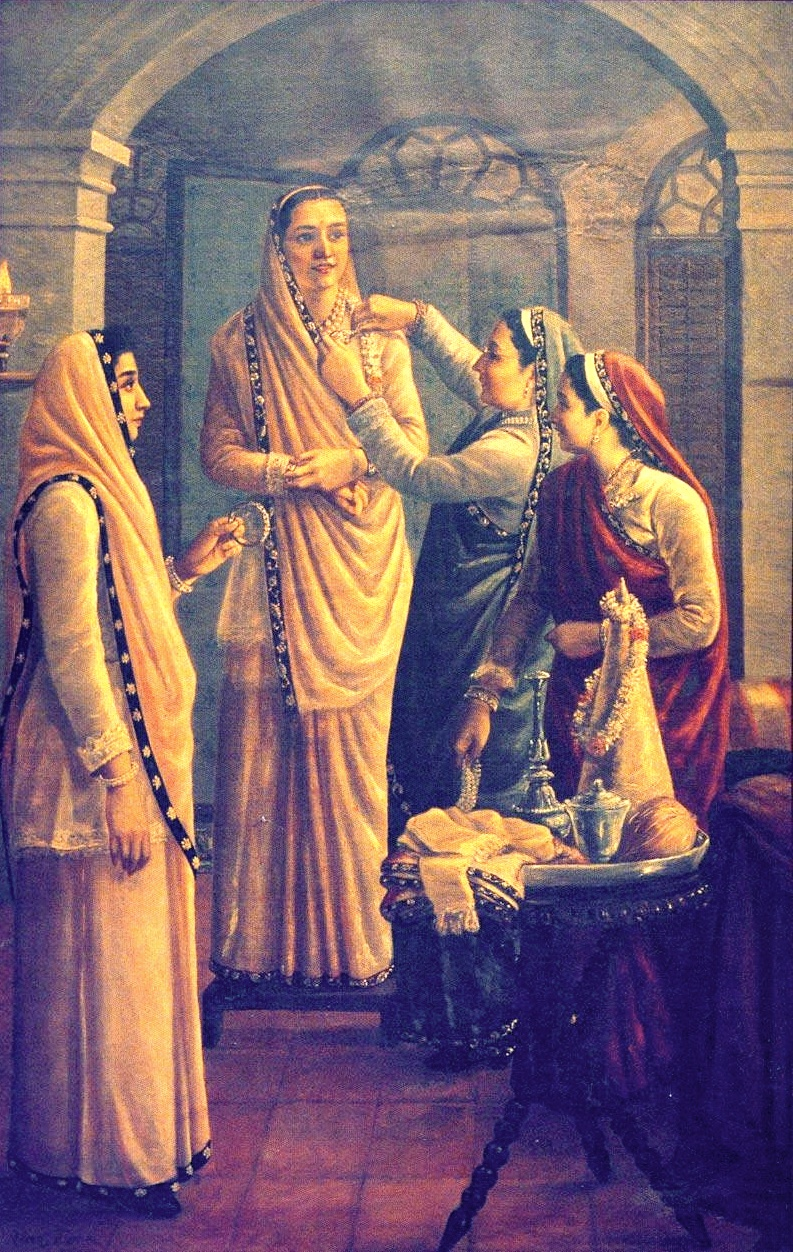
Painting of a Parsi woman being decorated before a wedding

At some point after the fall of the Sasanian Empire, perhaps in the 9th century, a group of Zoroastrians seeking to safeguard their religion left their homeland and migrated to India, where they gave rise to the Zoroastrian Parsi community. The movement was led by a group of priests. Parsi oral tradition claims that one of these, named Testar, was a woman. The early centuries of Parsi history in India is almost entirely unknown.

Zoroastrianism among the Parsi developed from the doctrine endorsed by the Sasanian-era priesthood, since the establishment of the Parsi community was led by Zoroastrian priests. In early modern India, Zoroastrian men continued to exercise socio-religious control over Zoroastrian women. In 1818, a punchayet (community council) of six priests and twelve laymen responded to complaints of "immoral behavior" among Parsi women by issuing a series of women-specific codes of conduct. These included banning women from visiting Hindu or Muslim holy places and taking part in Hindu and Muslim rituals, as well as banning women from going out alone between sunset and sunrise. Women who did venture out in the dark alone were under threat of being caught by guards and having their heads shaved.

The rise of Western-style education in India in the 19th century significantly impacted Zoroastrian religious life. Educated women tended to marry later and defied the prevailing restrictions imposed by traditional teachings of ritual purity. Increasing female assertion also began to overturn the male monopoly on Zoroastrian religious discourse. The first female trustee of the Bombay Parsi Punchayet (BPP) was elected in 1939 and its first female president, Hirabai Cowasi Jehangir, served in 1974–1976. Of the seven BPP trustees, only three are however allowed to be women.

==== Iran ====
A Zoroastrian women's movement began to emerge in Iran in the 1950s. In 1956, two women were for the first time accepted onto the Council of the Anjoman in Tehran.

== Female-specific moral teachings ==
=== Purity and menstruation ===
Purity is an essential element in the Zoroastrian worldview. Zoroastrians believe that they must keep their bodies, minds, and environment pure in order to defeat evil. Although they are not fire-worshippers (as often mischaracterized), fire for this reason occupies a central role in Zoroastrianism as a supreme symbol of purity and a representation of divine light and wisdom. In the case that a Zoroastrian's state of purity is violated, they have historically been subjected to segregation. One major way to compromise purity is to come in contact with dead matter (nasu), for instance through contact with blood or through nocturnal emissions. The purity of both men and women can be compromised in this way. Male corpse bearers (nasāsālārs) are for instance in a constant state of impurity and as such physically segregated during events and in general social interaction.

Contact with dead matter presents a greater problem for women than it does for men. Women are considered to often be in an impure state since their bodies produce "dead matter" during menstruation and childbirth. This means that a Zoroastrian woman only has the opportunity to become "clean" in perpetuity at menopause. The notion that menstrual blood is dangerous is common in many religions and cultures. Zoroastrianism considers all substances leaving the body to be ritually impure, including hair, nails, skin, feces, saliva, breath, blood, and semen. Dead matter is attributed to the demon Nasu. Pregnant women are believed to be particularly vulnerable to Nasu and thus encouraged to avoid contact with decomposing or dead matter. Some Zoroastrians light a protective divo (a candle or oil lamp) during pregnancies to keep away demons.

Zoroastrianism has historically considered it to be a woman's moral duty to sequester herself during menstruation so that her touch or glance would not "contaminate". It is unclear to what degree this practice has ever been implemented. In mid-20th century India it was common for Zoroastrian women with menses to live alone in one part of the house, wearing old clothes and using metal utensils. Zoroastrian women in Iran at this time typically lived in an outbuilding away from water or fire during menstruation. Many Zoroastrians today see such stringent approaches as outdated or irrational. Zoroastrian women in Iran and India may still voluntarily isolate themselves after childbirth or during menstruation, and take care to keep distance from fires and avoid touching sacred objects and books. Zoroastrian women raised in the diaspora are less likely to observe these kind of restrictions.

=== Sexuality ===
The duty to marry and procreate is elevated in Zoroastrianism as a holy pursuit, for both men and women. Sexual love within marriage in the attempt to produce children is thus a virtuous act and seen in the context of a religious duty. Zoroastrians also believe that sexual intercourse compromises the purity of both men and women since semen is considered to be "dead matter". According to the Rivayats, both partners can purify themselves by reciting prayers before and after, and by following the act with a ritual washing.

The "wasting of seed" is considered a grave sin. For this reason, and because it can not lead to the creation of children, male homosexuality has historically been cast as an act introduced into the world by Angra Mainyu. There is no historical explicit condemnation of female homosexuality in Zoroastrian tradition. Due to menstruation being seen as compromising purity, sexual intercourse during menstruation has also been historically regarded as sinful since it not only pollutes the other party but also does not lead to the conception of children.

=== Abortion ===
Zoroastrianism has historically considered abortion to be murder, on the part of both the father and the mother. According to Zoroastrian belief, every unborn human is a potential future soldier for Ahura Mazda in the struggle against evil. Abortion is seen as both killing an innocent and intrinsically good person, and as causing compromising purity through the dead body. It is thus considered an evil act, explicitly mentioned in the Avesta, Shāyest nē Shāyest, and the Book of Arda Viraf.

== Contemporary Zoroastrianism ==
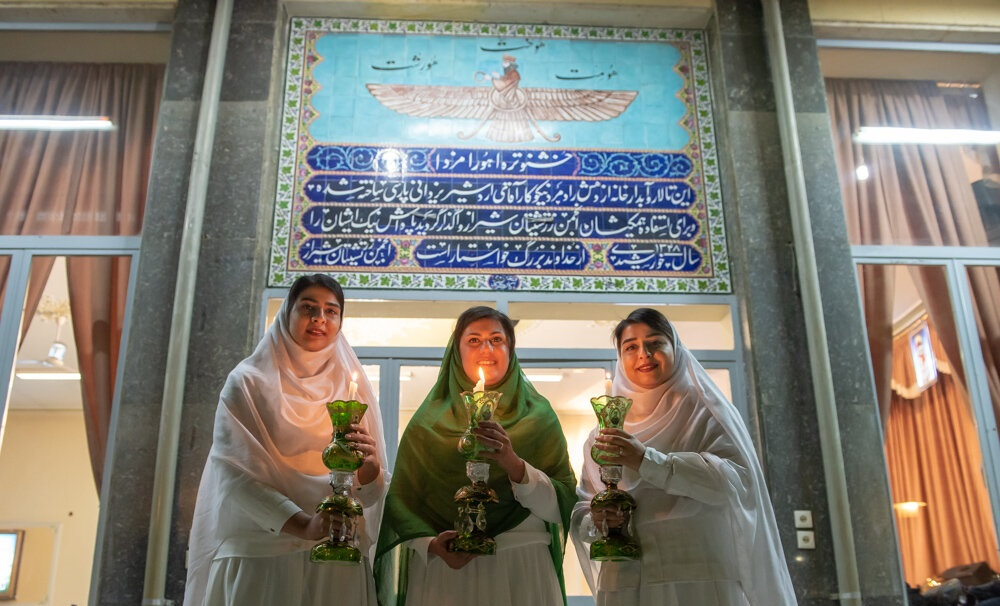
Three women celebrating Sadeh in Shiraz, 2020

The inner rituals of Zoroastrianism are still conducted by male priests and men predominate in the religious policy-making. Female involvement in Zoroastrian rituals has however increased in recent years. Modern proponents of further female influence in Zoroastrianism have argued that the Gathas, the oldest parts of the Avesta, attributed to Zoroaster himself, do not mention anything about menstruation and that menstruation-related purity concerns are later additions to Zoroastrian tradition. Most of the regulations of women in the Avesta are from the Vendidad. Modern Zoroastrian reformists have argued that this text is a corruption of Zoroaster's original teachings, written nearly 700 years after Zoroaster's death.

The modern Zoroastrian family is typically monogamous and employs a patrilineal system of descent. Zoroastrian marriage was up until recently considered to be permanent in Iran and India, especially when children were involved, though divorce is now regulated by Parsi matrimonial courts in India and the Council of Mūbads in Iran. The only specifically religious cause for divorce is apostasy, which applies to both the man and woman. There are no restrictions on remarriage for widows or divorcees.

There are no lay rituals in Zoroastrianism that are exclusive to men and women tend to be more active in daily religious observance. Some lay rituals are exclusively performed by women and the annual "pilgrimage" cycle for Zoroastrians in Iran includes a particular round for women, who visit specific shrines where rituals are women-led and women-oriented. As of 2008, some villages in Iran employ post-menopausal women as "guardians" of Zoroastrian shrines.

=== Female clergy ===
Women in Zoroastrianism have historically been excluded from being priests or holding other higher religious offices. Partly inspired by feminist perspectives in other religions, women have more recently called for further influence, through resistance remains among conservative elements of the Zoroastrian clergy.

In 2008, the North American councils of both Iranian mūbads and Parsi mōbeds decided to allow laywomen to begin training as mūbādyars (assistant priests). In February 2011, eight Iranian Zoroastrian women were invested as mūbādyars in a ceremony held in a hall adjacent to the Adrian Temple of Tehran. In early December 2012, two women were invested as mūbādyars in a ceremony in Ontario, Canada after having fulfilled the criteria determined by the North American Mobed's Council.

In 2009, Mobed Soroushpur, chairman of the Council of Tehran Mobeds in Iran, suggested that the full priesthood should formally be opened to women and pointed to evidence of female clergy in ancient Iran. A majority of Zoroastrians welcomed this proposal, though it was opposed by more conservative priests who believed that women should only be able to become full priests after menopause, though could as already determined serve as mūbādyars before then. Traditionalist priests insisted that women could not perform rituals during their periods, since they were then impure, and they for this reason could not be full priests. Soroushpur personally opposed these ideas, finding them discriminatory and conservative.

Female clergy have leading roles among Kurdish Zoroastrian communities that emerged in the Kurdistan region of Iraq in the beginning of the 21st century.
