= Atashgah Manmade-Cave =

Cave in Iran

- Fire Cave
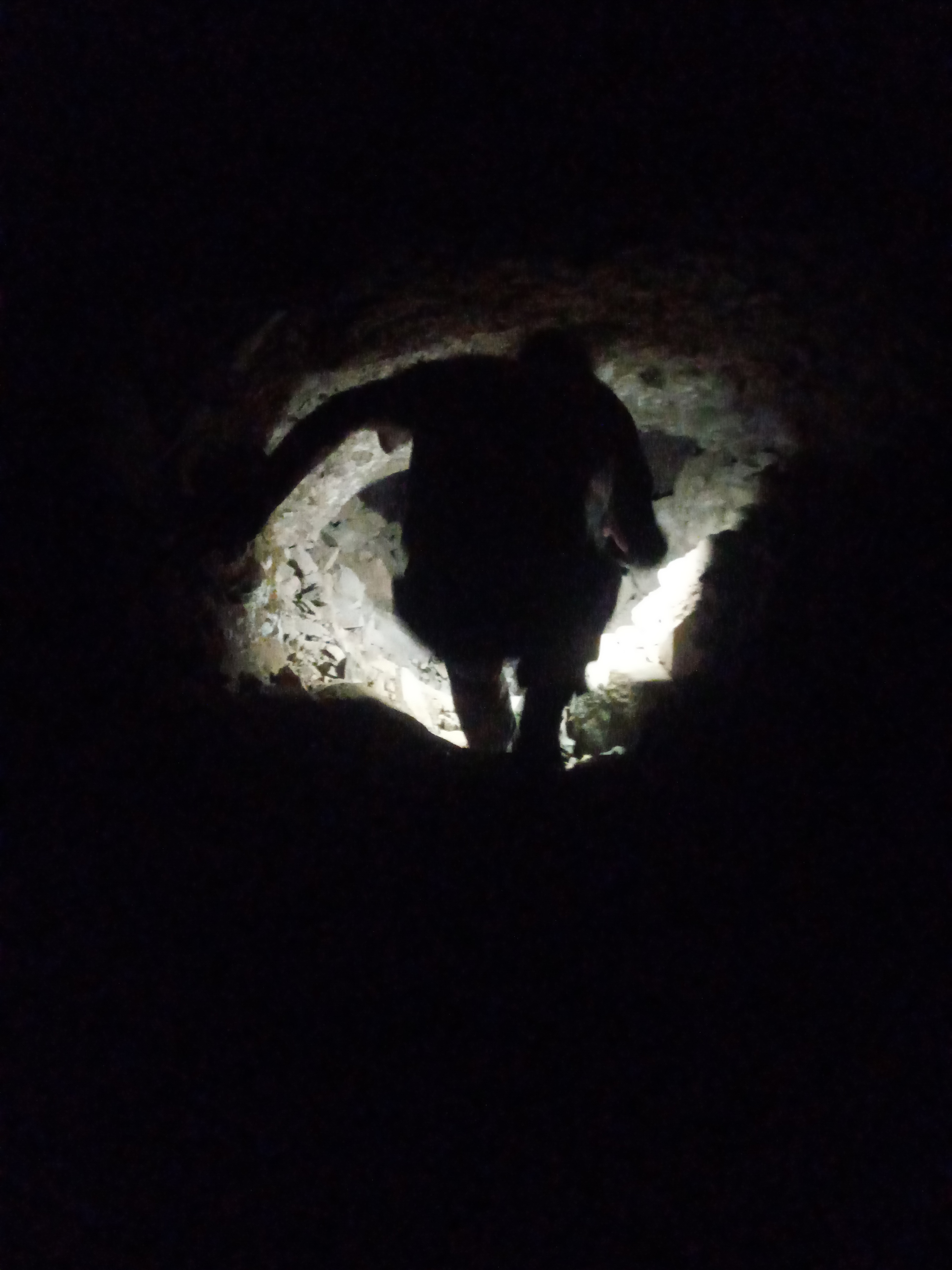
- Atashgah Cave

- Location within Iran
- Interactive map of Atashgah Manmade-Cave
- Location: Razavi Khorasan province
- Coordinates: 35°19′02″N 58°23′02″E

The Atashgah Manmade-Cave or Atashgah Cave is located 20 km northwest of Kashmar city, Razavi Khorasan province, Iran and the cave has two entrance passages.

== See also ==
- Atashgah Castle
