= Espi Mazget =

Former mosque in Rezvanshahr County, Gilan Province, Iran

- اسپی مزگت
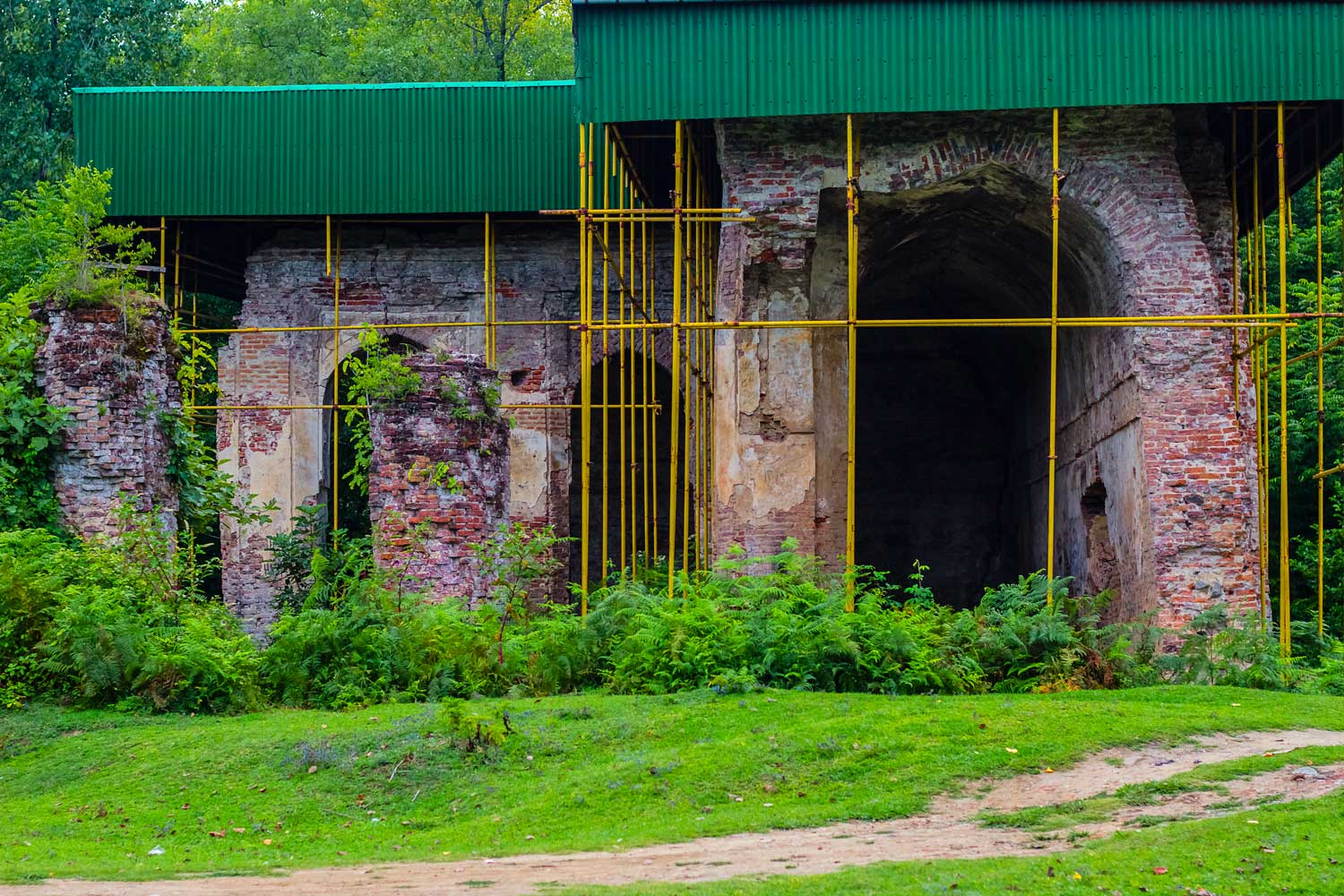
- The former mosque exterior in 2019

- Location of the former mosque in Iran

Religion
- Affiliation: Islam (former)
- Ecclesiastical or organisational status: Mosque (former)
- Status: Inactive (partial ruinous state)

Location
- Location: Dinachal, Rezvanshahr County, Gilan Province
- Country: Iran
- Coordinates: 37°38′17.3″N 49°2′53.1″E

Architecture
- Type: Mosque architecture
- Style: Seljuk
- Completed: 11th century CE

Specifications
- Length: 18 m (59 ft)
- Width: 15.5 m (51 ft)
- Height (max): 7.4 m (24 ft)
- Materials: Brick; plaster

Iran National Heritage List
- Official name: Espi Mazget
- Type: Built
- Designated: 7 October 2000
- Reference no.: 2796
- Conservation organization: Cultural Heritage, Handicrafts and Tourism Organization of Iran

The Espi Mazget (Talysh: Espi Mazgat, lit. 'White Mosque'; Persian: اسپی مزگت, romanized: Masjed-e Sefid, lit. 'White Mosque') is a pre-Islamic ancient sanctuary that was also used as a mosque in the Seljuk and Safavid eras. It lies 80 km west of the city of Rasht and 22 km south of the city of Talesh (Hashtpar), in the rural district (dehestan) of Dinachal Parehsar, on the western bank of the Dinachal River. The former mosque was completed during the Seljuk era on the site of a former fire temple from the Sasanian era.

The former mosque was added to the Iran National Heritage List on 7 October 2000, administered by the Cultural Heritage, Handicrafts and Tourism Organization of Iran.

== Etymology of the name ==
The name Espi Māzgat means "white mosque" in Talyshi (espi "white"; in Persian it's "sefid"). The Arabic word for mosque (masjid) is also said to derive from the same ancient Iranian word, "Māzgat". Moreover, Persian uses the ezafe construction, which is why the same name in Persian is "Masjed-e Sefid".

The toponym "Māzgat" is still preserved in Northern Talysh, where there is a mountain of the same name, Māzgataband, as well the remains of an ancient temple called Māzgat in Astara.

== See also ==
- Islam in Iran
- List of mosques in Iran
- List of fire temples in Iran
