= Sarv-e Abarkuh =

Exceptionally old cypress tree in Yazd province, Iran

Cypress of Abarkuh
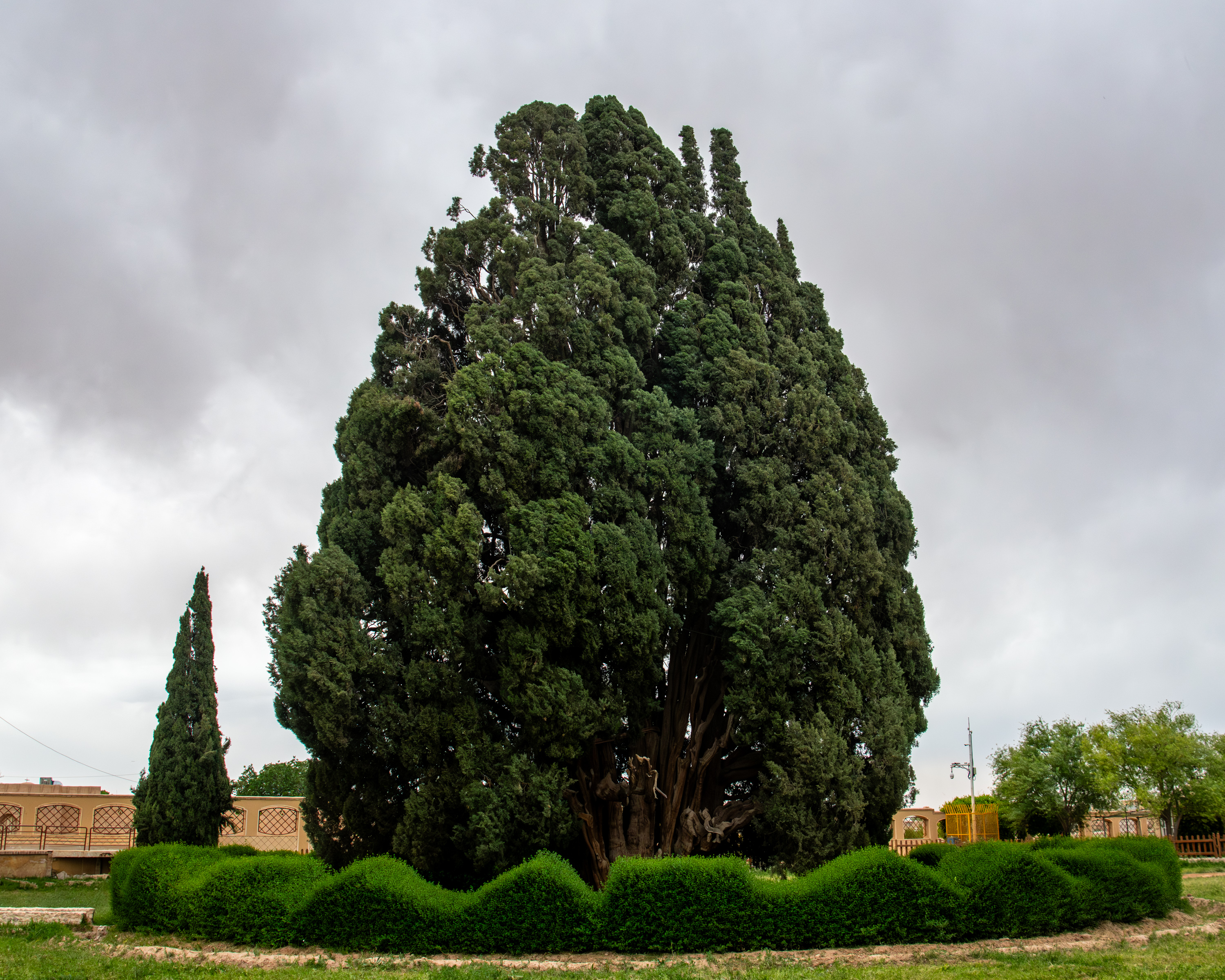
- Sarv-e Abar Kuh

- Location within Iran

- Native name: سرو ابرکوه (Persian)
- Species: Mediterranean cypress (Cupressus sempervirens)
- Location: Abarkuh, Yazd, Iran
- Coordinates: 31.12264°N 53.27984°E
- Height: 25 m (82 ft 0 in)
- Date seeded: circa. 2500 BCE

The Cypress of Abarkuh (Persian: سرو ابرکوه Sarv-e Abarkuh), also called the Zoroastrian Sarv, is a Persian cypress (Cupressus sempervirens) tree in Abarkuh in Yazd Province of Iran. It is protected by the Cultural Heritage Organization of Iran as a national natural monument and is a major tourist attraction with a height of 25 metres (82 ft 0 in) and with a perimeter of 11.5 metres (37 ft 9 in) at its trunk and 18 metres (59 ft 1 in) higher up around its branches. It is estimated to be over four millennia old and is likely the oldest living lifeform in Asia.

According to legend, the tree was planted by Zoroaster, the founder of the Zoroastrian religion. It is said that Zoroaster left to spread his teachings to an Iranian city towards Balkh and met Shah Vishtaspa. He stopped at Abarkuh and supposedly planted this tree.

== Gallery ==
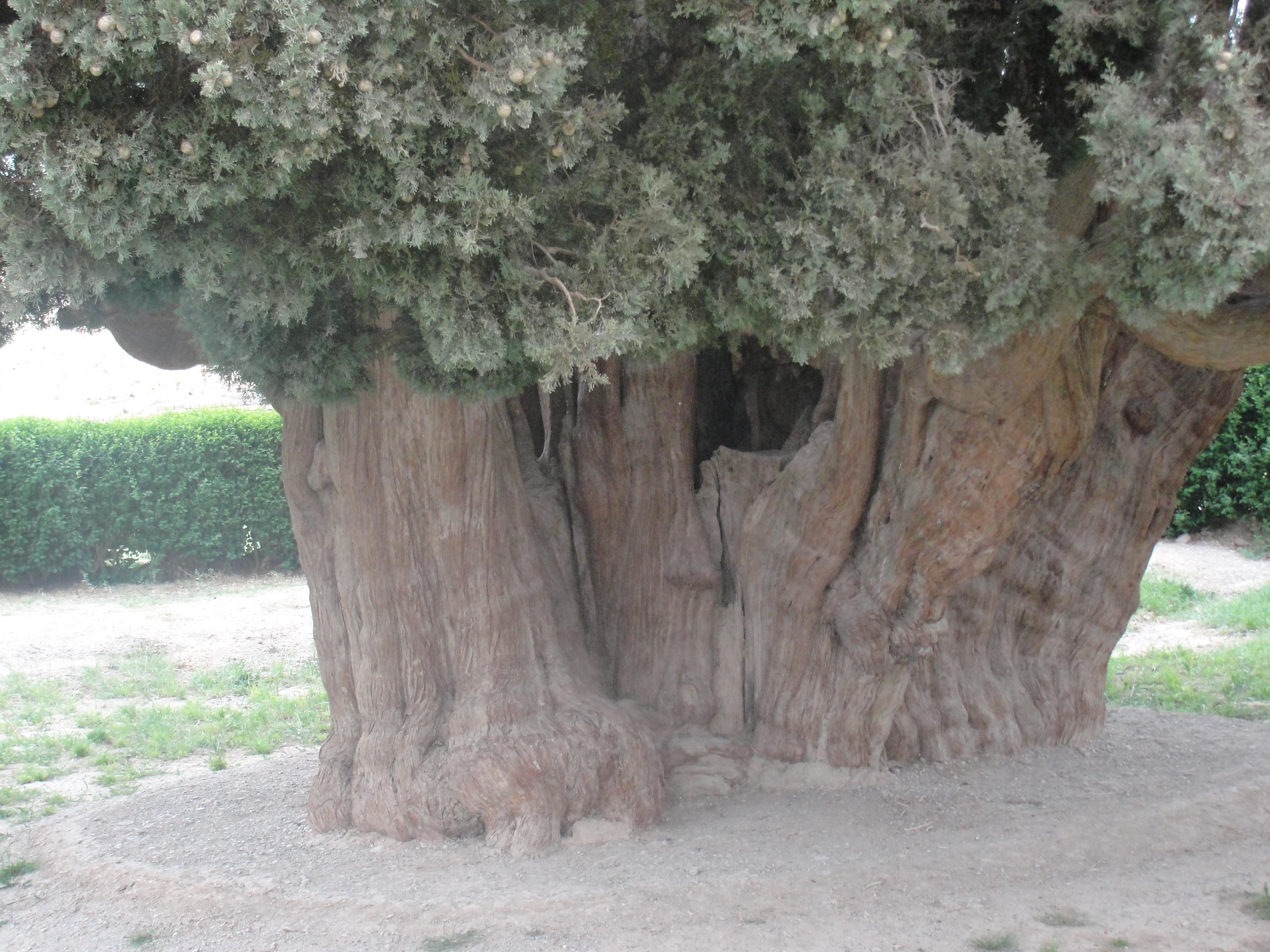

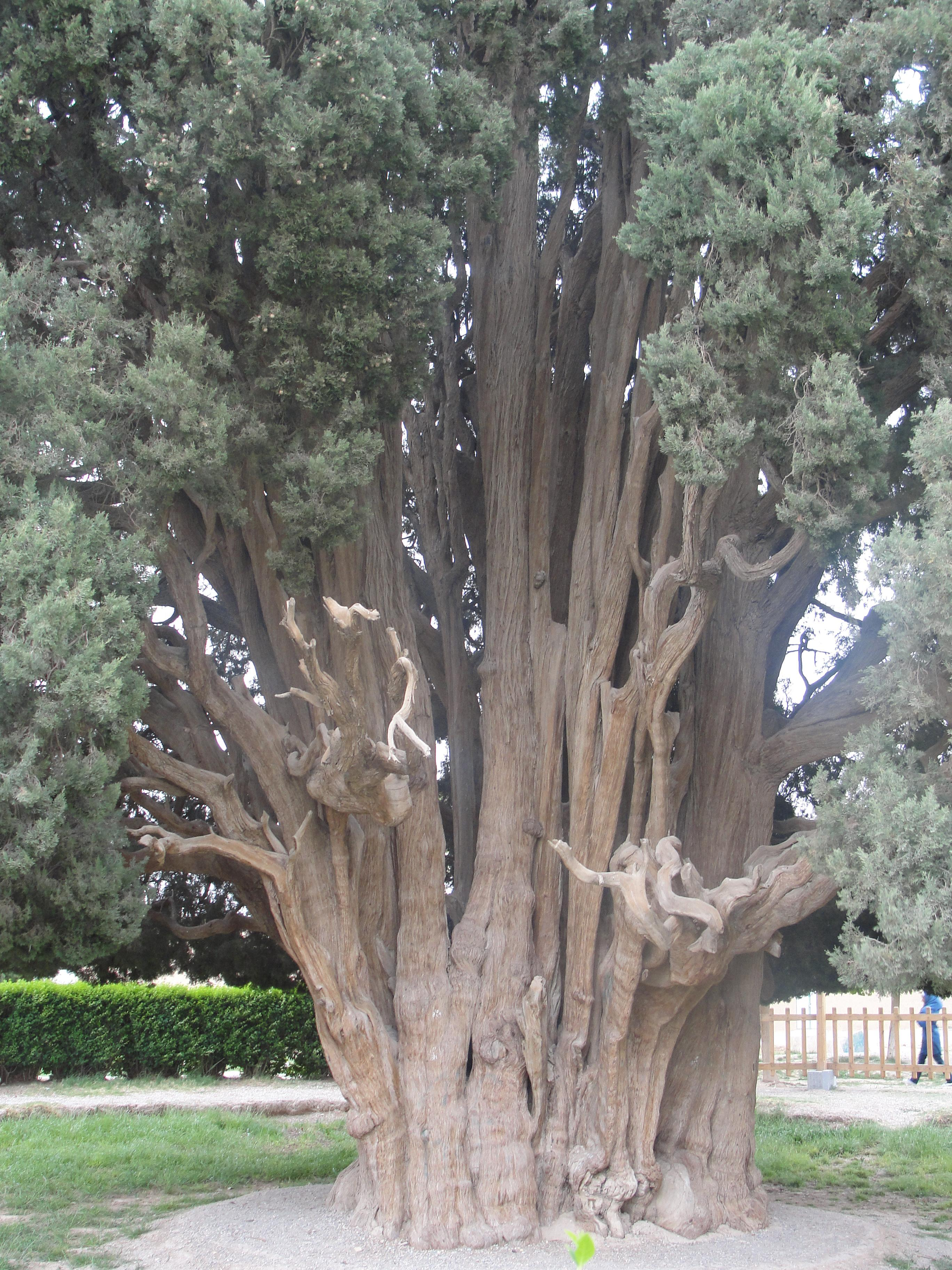

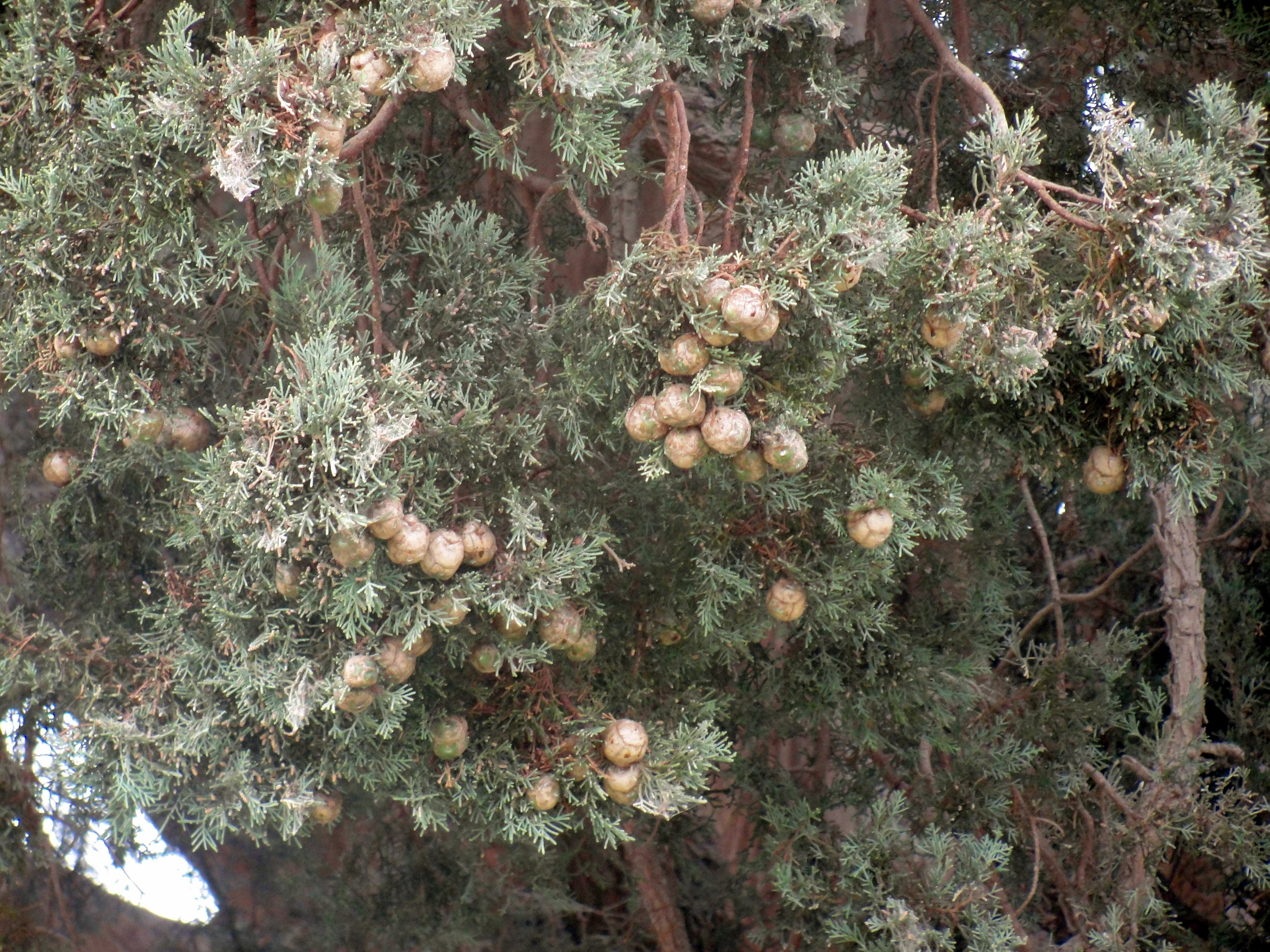
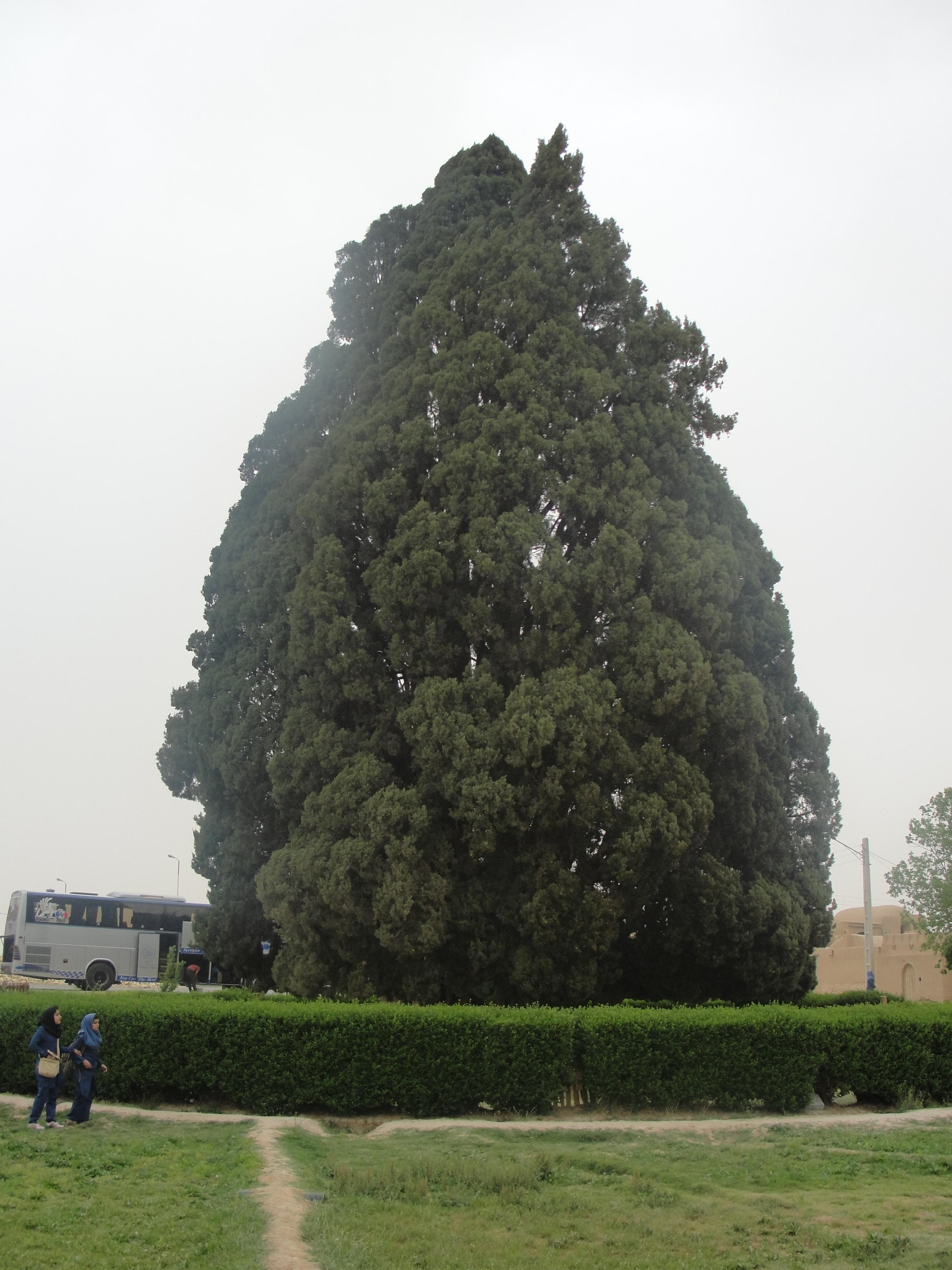

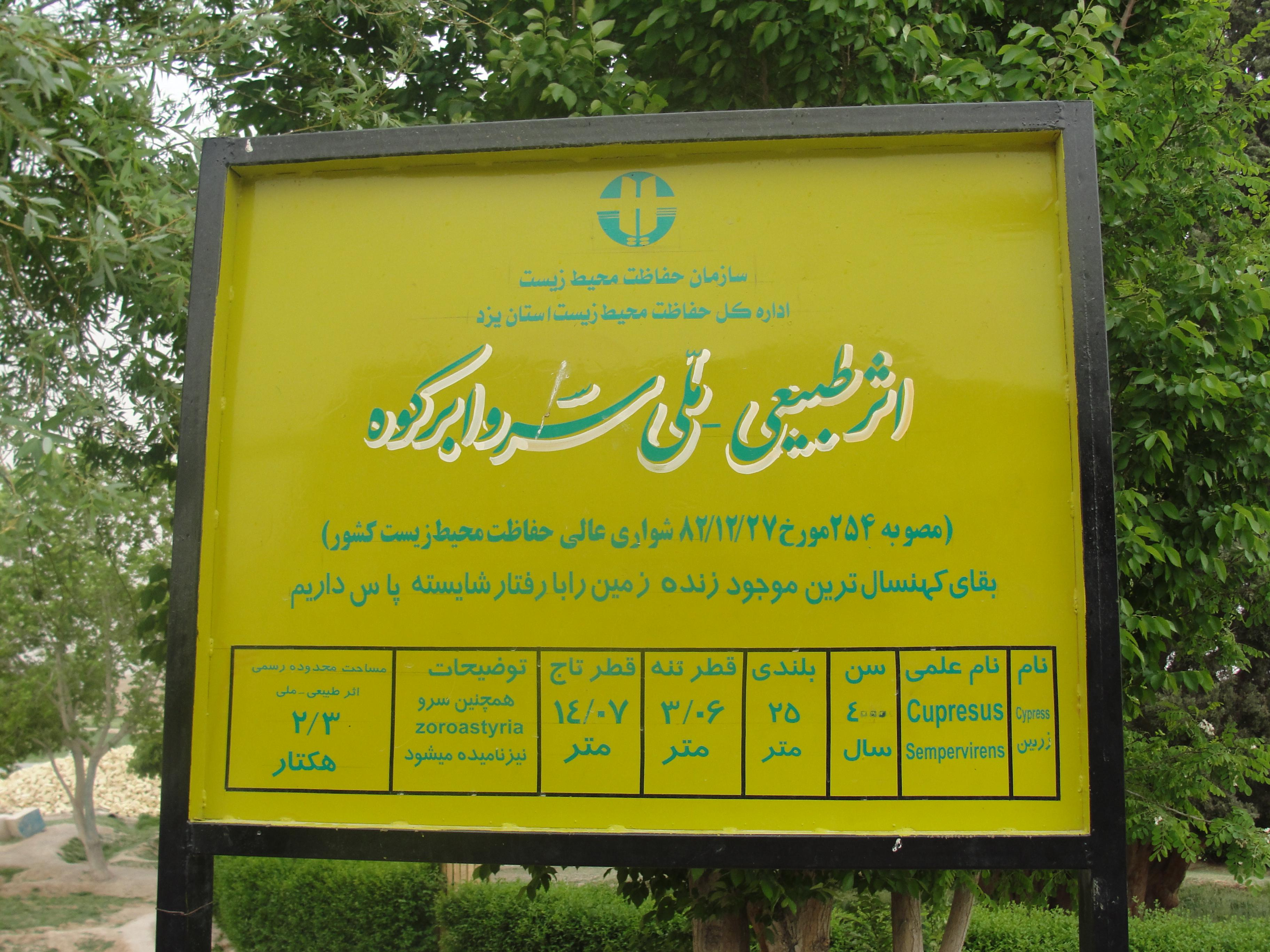

== See also ==
- List of oldest trees
- List of individual trees
- Cypress of Kashmar
- Yaldā Night
