= Adrian Temple of Tehran =

Zoroastrian fire temple in Tehran, Iran

- نیایشگاه آدریان تهران
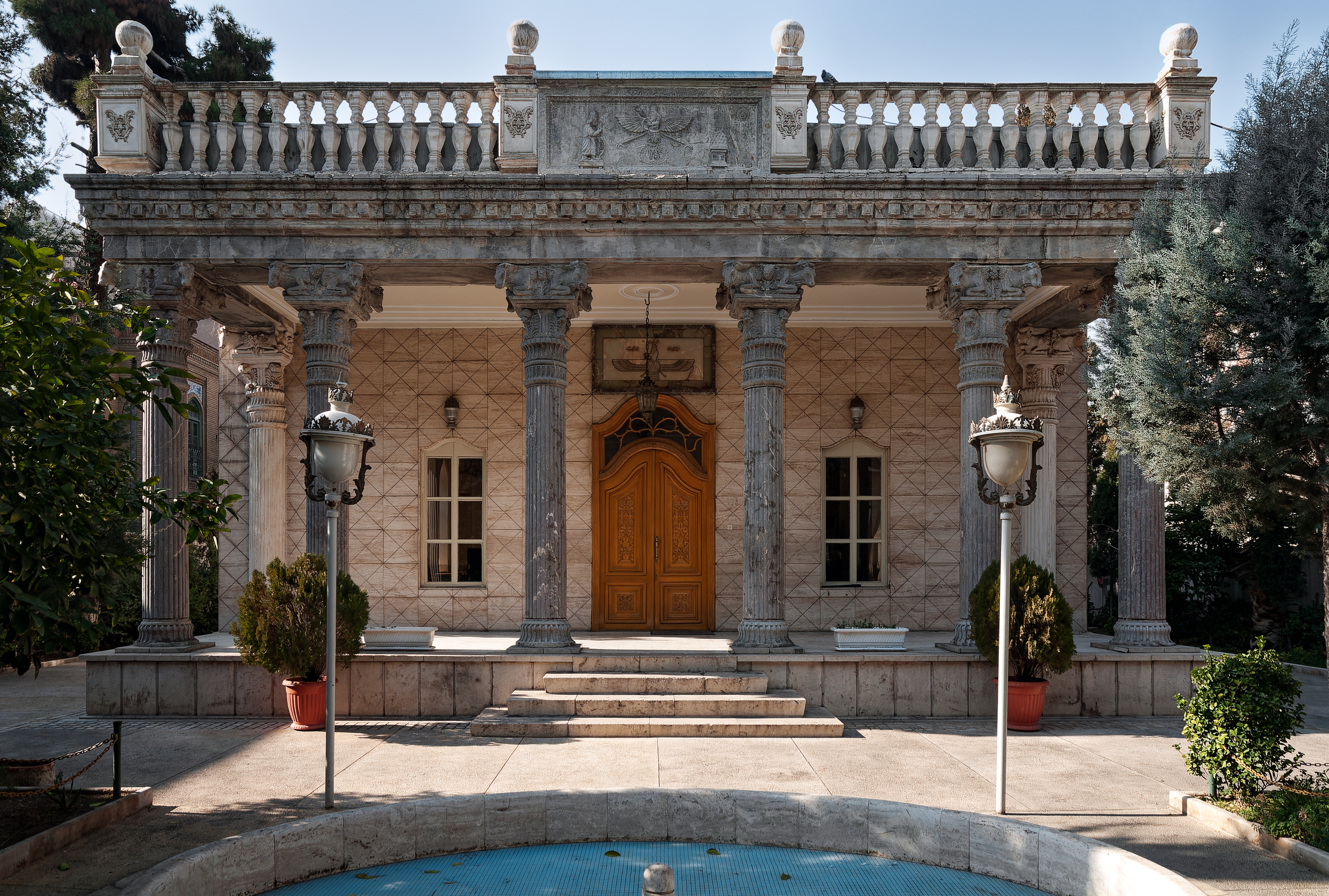
- Façade of the Adrian Temple of Tehran

- Location in Tehran, Iran

Religion
- Affiliation: Zoroastrianism
- Year consecrated: 1917
- Status: Active

Location
- Municipality: Tehran
- Country: Iran
- Coordinates: 35.695672°N 51.414073°E

Architecture
- Groundbreaking: August 1913
- Completed: 1917

The Adrian Temple of Tehran (Persian: نیایشگاه آدریان تهران, romanized: Niâyešgāh-e Ādriān-e Tehrān), also called the Great Adorian, is a Zoroastrian fire temple in Tehran, Iran. Opened during the late Qajar era in 1917, it is the only fire temple in Tehran, and has been on the Iran National Heritage List since 2003. The fire continuously burning within the temple goes back to a line of fires burning since 470 CE.

== History ==
In the 19th century, the Indian subcontinent harbored a large community of Zoroastrian Parsis, descendants from Persians who fled from religious persecution after the Arab conquest of Persia, as well as later Zoroastrian refugees fleeing Qajar rule. In 1853, the Society for the Amelioration of the Conditions of the Zoroastrians in Persia was founded in Bombay, India, with the goal of improving conditions for Zoroastrians in the "original homeland" of Iran.

The Iran-Parsi connections were instrumental in the realization of the Adrian Temple: it was largely made possible by Keikhosrow Shahrokh, who had been to school in Bombay, with the financial backing of the Bombay sisters Zarbai and Sunabai Dubash as well as of Parsi philanthropist Bahramji Bikaji. Shahrokh was the first Zoroastrian representative to the Iranian parliament, serving from 1908 until 1940.

The foundation stone was laid in August 1913 by the minister of education at the time, and future prime minister, Mehdi Qoli Hedayat. However, due to bad press concerning Tehran Zoroastrians in Bombay newspapers, the financial aid from India halted, leaving the temple without a roof until Zoroastrians within Iran were able to finance its completion in 1917.

The consecration ceremony was held on 30 November 1917, or the ninth day of the ninth month in the Zoroastrian and Persian calendars, the day of the fire festival of Azergan. The fire within the temple, which has been burning ever since, was brought over the course of 25 days from the Fire Temple of Yazd, and thus claims a lineage of fire going back to at least 470 CE.

The original brick façade was changed to marble in 1966, financed by Fereydoun Farahmand in memory of Shirmard Farahmand.

== Building ==
The layout of the temple is based on Parsi designs. A portico of six columns flanks the entrance, leading into the assembly and prayer hall. Burning within the domed fire chamber, or ātašgāh, the fire is visible from three sides through glass windows. The building sits on a site of approximately 1300 square metres, and is fronted by an oval 4-by-8 metre water basin. The building contains an additional hall, named Iraj, for ceremonies, among other rooms and halls in the complex.

== Current use ==
Managed by the Zoroastrian Association of Tehran, the Adrian Temple is the only functioning and active Zoroastrian fire temple in Tehran. While it is thus used for Zoroastrian ceremonies including Nowruz, Sadeh, and weddings, for example, it is at other times open for visits by the general public.

== See also ==
- List of fire temples in Iran
- Iran National Heritage List
- Media related to Adrian Temple at Wikimedia Commons
