= Cypress of Kashmar =

Sacred tree in Zoroastrian legend

- Species: Cypress
- Location: Iran, Kashmar
- Date felled: c. 10 December 861

The Cypress of Kashmar was a cypress tree regarded as sacred to followers of Zoroastrianism. According to the Iranian epic Shahnameh, the tree had grown from a branch Zoroaster had carried away from Paradise and which he planted in honor of King Vishtaspa's conversion to Zoroastrianism in Kashmarbalkh. The spreading branches of the tree are used as an allusion to the spread of Zoroaster's creed.

On 10 December 861 AD, Abbasid caliph al-Mutawakkil, unable or unwilling to leave Baghdad, ordered the tree be felled and transported to his capital, so that carpenters might reassemble it for him. The villagers who lived near the tree pleaded with the caliph and offered money for its protection, to no avail. Al-Mutawakkil was murdered before the 1,300 camels carrying the cypress pieces reached Baghdad.

The palace and its spiral minaret still stands today.

== See also ==
- Adur Burzen-Mihr
- Zoroastrian Sarv
- Torshiz
- List of individual trees
