= Fire Temple of Kazerun =

Iranian national heritage site

Fire Temple of Kazerun آتشکده کازرون
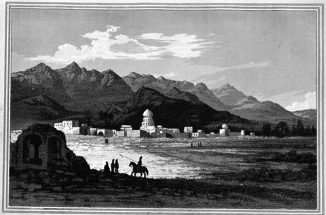
- Engraving by Theodore Henry Adolphus Fielding, 1817/18

Religion
- Affiliation: Zoroastrianism
- Province: Fars province

Iran National Heritage List
- Official name: Fire Temple of Kazerun
- Type: Fire Temple
- Designated: 1940
- Reference no.: 331
- Conservation organization: Cultural Heritage, Handicrafts and Tourism Organization of Iran

Location
- Location: Kazerun County, Iran

The Fire Temple of Kazerun (Persian: آتشکده کازرون, romanized: Atashkadeh-ye Kazerun) is a historic Fire Temple constructed during the Sasanian era located in Kazerun County, Fars province.
