= Atashgah Castle =

Castle in Kashmar, Iran

- قلعه آتشگاه
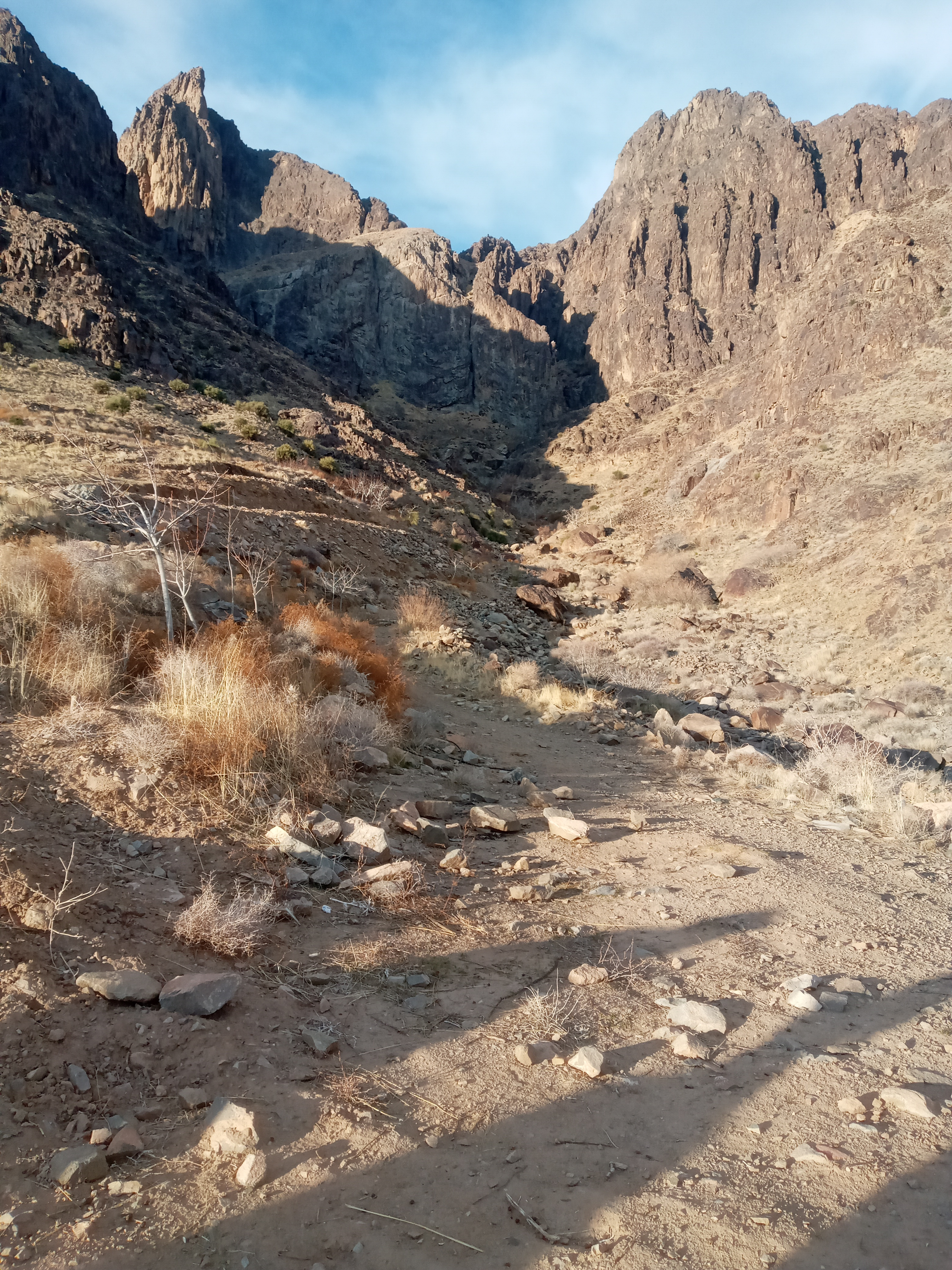
- Atashgah Castle is one of the castles in Iran

- Location within Iran
- Interactive map of the Atashgah Castle area

General information
- Status: Ruined
- Type: Castle
- Architectural style: Sasanian
- Location: Kashmar, Iran
- Coordinates: 35°18′59″N 58°23′10″E

Technical details
- Structural system: Defensive

Atashgah Castle (Persian: قلعه آتشگاه) is a famous Sasanian era castle in the city of Kashmar, Iran.

== Location ==
This fort is one of the most prominent and superior ancient forts of Iran in terms of inaccessibility and resistance against invaders and easily competes with the fortifications of Babak Fort in Kaleybar and Alamut Castle in Alamut. This shows that the builders of the castle have carried out extensive field studies to locate it. In total, Atashgah Castle is built on a high rocky cliff and difficult to cross, three sides of which are high and dangerous precipices. Around this cliff, shortly after the precipices, the walls of other high cliffs have re-enclosed it in the form of impenetrable and inaccessible fortifications.

== See also ==
- Atashgah Manmade-Cave
- Sasanian Empire
- Adur Burzen-Mihr
