= Adur Burzen-Mihr =

Major Zoroastrian sacred fire

Adur Burzen-Mihr (Middle Iranian) or Azar Barzin (Persian: آذر برزین) was an Atash Behram (a Zoroastrian fire temple of the highest grade) located in Parthia. In the Sasanian era, it was one of the three Great Fires and was associated with the farmer class; the other two were Adur Farnbag (fa) in Persis which was associated with the priest class, and Adur Gushnasp in Media, which was associated with the warrior class. Its establishment can be dated to the late 5th or early 4th century BC. Adur means "Holy Fire", and Burzēn-Mihr is a Parthian given name which literally means "Exalted is Mihr" and is probably the name of the temple's founder.

This Fire is described in Bundahishn. Its location is given as Mount Rēvand (fa) (in Avestan: Raēvant), probably a spur of the Binalud Mountains in the district formerly known as Rēvand (fa) in Khorasan. An element of the name is preserved in the name of the nearby village Barzanun. Another identification is Mount Mehr, five miles from the village Mehr on the Shahrud–Sabzevar Highway. Some identify it with the Fire of Asaak.

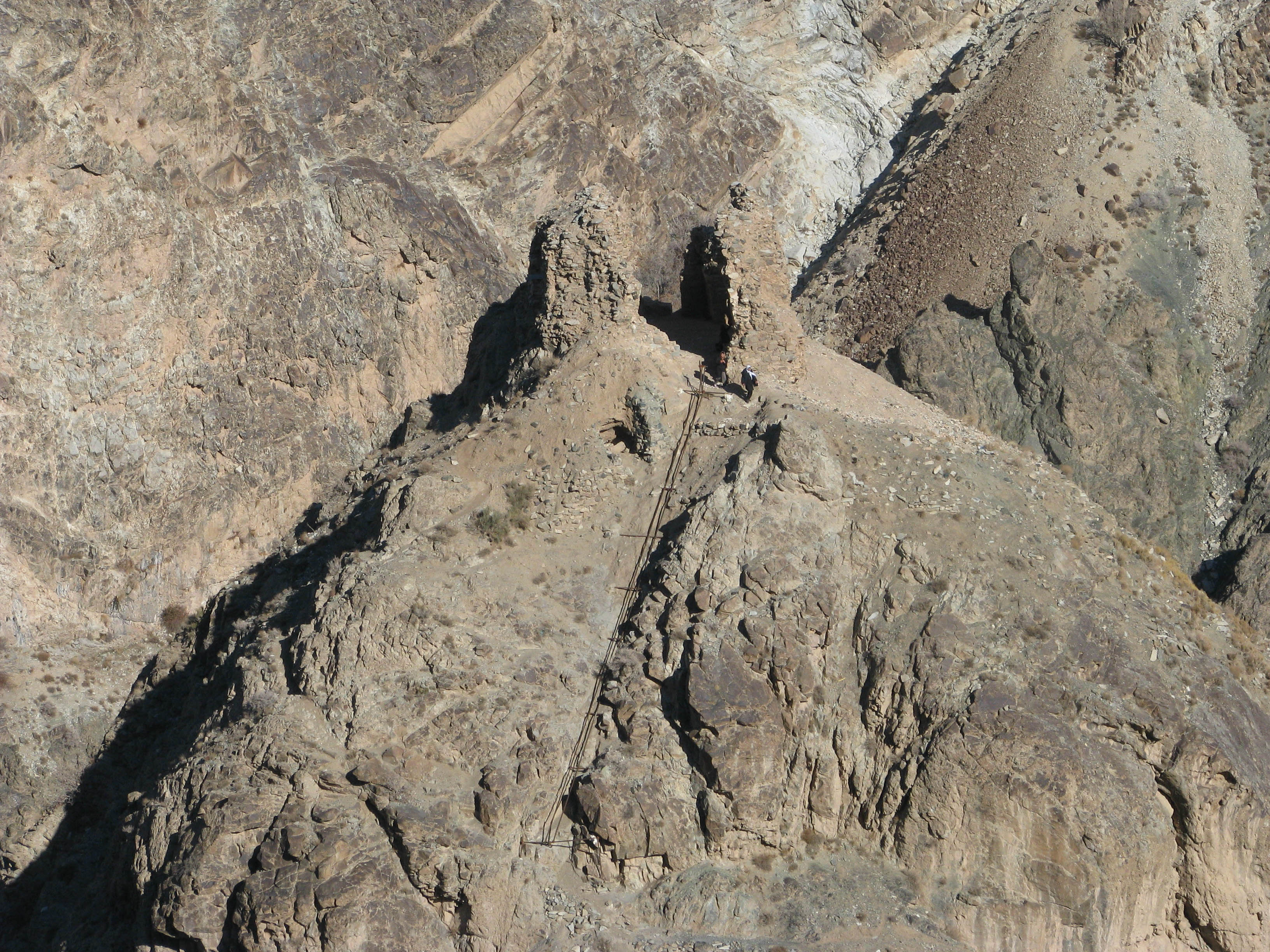
Khaneh Div fire temple near the Mehr village, identified as the Azur Burzen-Mihr

Adur Burzen-Mihr purported location in Atashgah Castle, Kashmar

The Fire is mentioned several times in the Shahnameh as Mehr-Barzīn (مهر برزین), Mehr (مهر), and Barzīn (برزین), and is used also as a simile for fiery fierceness.

The Fire is thought to have been a major center of pilgrimage, even after the Arsacids' fall. In the Sasanian era, although its name was always placed third in texts and the fire was associated with the lowliest class of the society, (farmers; the other two being warriors and priests), it still maintained its importance. Its history in the Islamic era is unknown.

== See also ==
- Cypress of Kashmar
- Atashgah Castle
