= Jordavi =

Village in Razavi Khorasan province, Iran

Jordavi Persian: جردوي
- Village
- Location within Iran
- Coordinates: 35°12′44″N 58°35′46″E
- Country: Iran
- Province: Razavi Khorasan
- County: Kashmar
- District: Farah Dasht
- Rural District: Qaleh-ye Bala

Population (2016)
  - Total: 931
- Time zone: UTC+3:30 (IRST)

Jordavi (Persian: جردوي) (Note: Also romanized as Jordavī) is a village in, and the capital of, Qaleh-ye Bala Rural District in Farah Dasht District of Kashmar County, Razavi Khorasan province, Iran, whose population at the time of the 2016 National Census was 931 people in 269 households. The previous capital of the rural district was the village of Farahabad, (Note: Also known as Qaleh-ye Bala) now a neighborhood in the city of Farg Qaleh.

== Demographics ==
=== Population ===
At the time of the 2006 National Census, the village's population was 894 in 207 households, when it was in Bala Velayat Rural District of the Central District. The following census in 2011 counted 900 people in 238 households. The 2016 census measured the population of the village as 931 people in 269 households.

In 2019, Jordavi was transferred to Qaleh-ye Bala Rural District created in the new Farah Dasht District.
