= Farg, Kashmar =

Neighborhood in Razavi Khorasan province, Iran

Farg Persian: فرگ
- Neighborhood
- Location within Iran
- Coordinates: 35°13′38″N 58°33′29″E
- Country: Iran
- Province: Razavi Khorasan
- County: Kashmar
- District: Farah Dasht
- City: Farg Qaleh

Population (2016)
  - Total: 2,134
- Time zone: UTC+3:30 (IRST)

Farg (Persian: فرگ) (Note: Also known as Qaleh-ye Pain (قلعه پائين)) is a neighborhood in the city of Farg Qaleh in Farah Dasht District of Kashmar County, Razavi Khorasan province, Iran.

== Demographics ==
=== Population ===
At the time of the 2006 National Census, Farg's population was 2,477 in 615 households, when it was a village in Bala Velayat Rural District of the Central District. The following census in 2011 counted 2,459 people in 727 households. The 2016 census measured the population of the village as 2,134 people in 663 households.

In 2019, Farg was transferred to Qaleh-ye Bala Rural District created in the new Farah Dasht District. In 2021, the village was merged with the village of Farahabad (Note: Also known as Qaleh-ye Bala) to form the new village of Farg Qaleh, which was converted to a city the following year.
