= Quch Palang =

Village in Razavi Khorasan province, Iran

Quch Palang Persian: قوچ پلنگ
- Village
- Location within Iran
- Coordinates: 35°16′23″N 58°36′25″E
- Country: Iran
- Province: Razavi Khorasan
- County: Kashmar
- District: Farah Dasht
- Rural District: Rezqabad

Population (2016)
  - Total: 861
- Time zone: UTC+3:30 (IRST)

Quch Palang (Persian: قوچ پلنگ) (Note: Also romanized as Qūch Palang) is a village in Rezqabad Rural District of Farah Dasht District in Kashmar County, Razavi Khorasan province, Iran.

== Demographics ==
=== Population ===
At the time of the 2006 National Census, the village's population was 763 in 178 households, when it was in Bala Velayat Rural District of the Central District. The following census in 2011 counted 826 people in 217 households. The 2016 census measured the population of the village as 861 people in 243 households.

In 2019, Quch Palang was transferred to Rezqabad Rural District created in the new Farah Dasht District.
