= Kazhghuneh =

Village in Razavi Khorasan province, Iran

Kazhghuneh Persian: کاژغونه
- Village
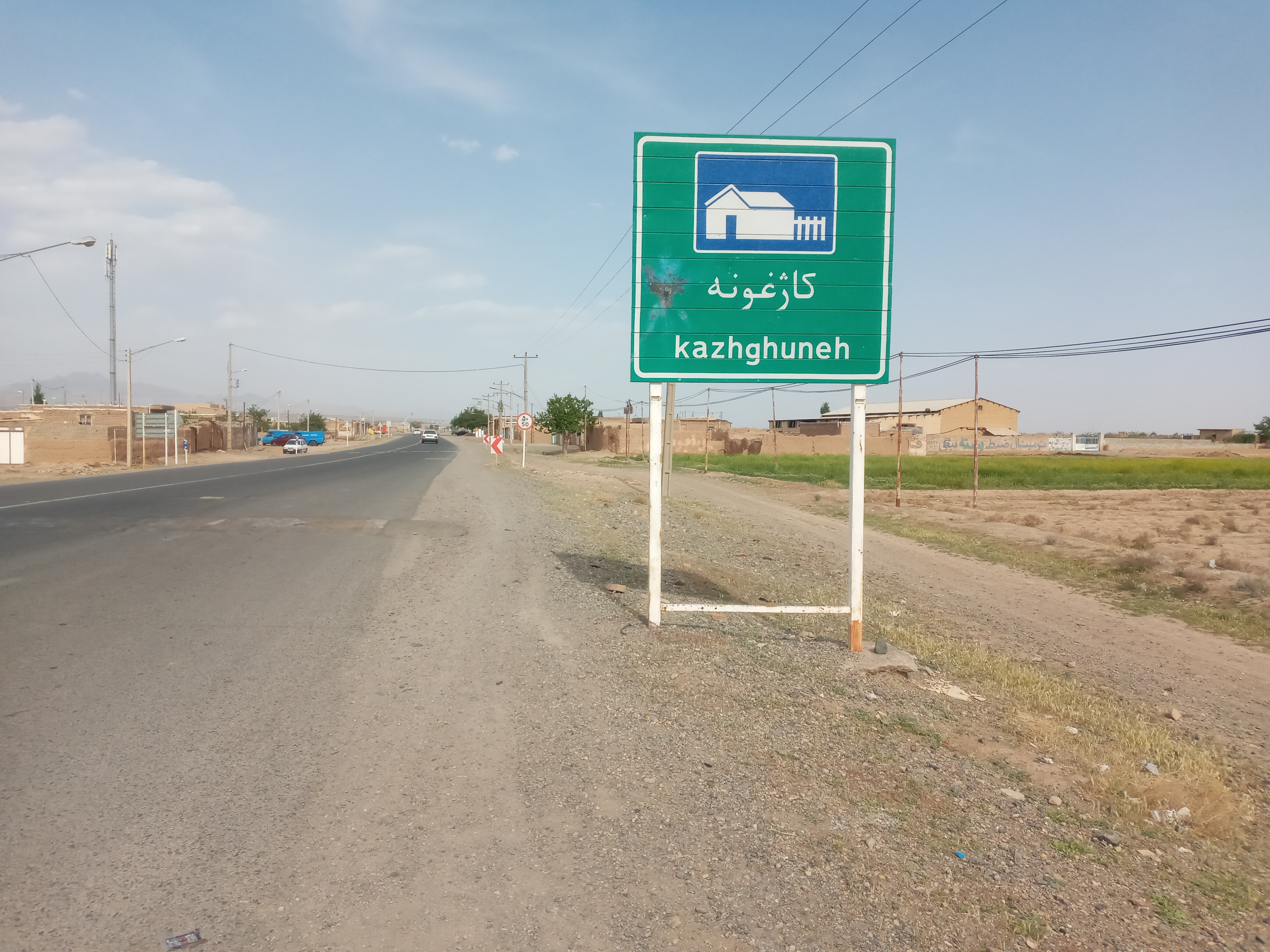
- Entrance sign to the village of Kazhghuneh

- Location within Iran
- Coordinates: 35°12′52″N 58°32′24″E
- Country: Iran
- Province: Razavi Khorasan
- County: Kashmar
- District: Farah Dasht
- Rural District: Rezqabad

Population (2016)
  - Total: 324
- Time zone: UTC+3:30 (IRST)

Kazhghuneh (Persian: کاژغونه) (Note: Also romanized as Kāzhghūneh; also known as Kajghuneh (كاج غونه), also romanized as Kājghūneh) is a village in Rezqabad Rural District of Farah Dasht District in Kashmar County, Razavi Khorasan province, Iran.

== Demographics ==
=== Population ===
At the time of the 2006 National Census, the village's population was 271 in 80 households, when it was in Bala Velayat Rural District of the Central District. The following census in 2011 counted 318 people in 98 households. The 2016 census measured the population of the village as 324 people in 104 households.

In 2019, Kazhghuneh was transferred to Rezqabad Rural District created in the new Farah Dasht District.
