= Nay, Iran =

Village in Razavi Khorasan province, Iran

Nay Persian: ناي
- Village
- Location within Iran
- Coordinates: 35°16′24″N 58°42′50″E
- Country: Iran
- Province: Razavi Khorasan
- County: Kashmar
- District: Farah Dasht
- Rural District: Qaleh-ye Bala

Population (2016)
  - Total: 708
- Time zone: UTC+3:30 (IRST)

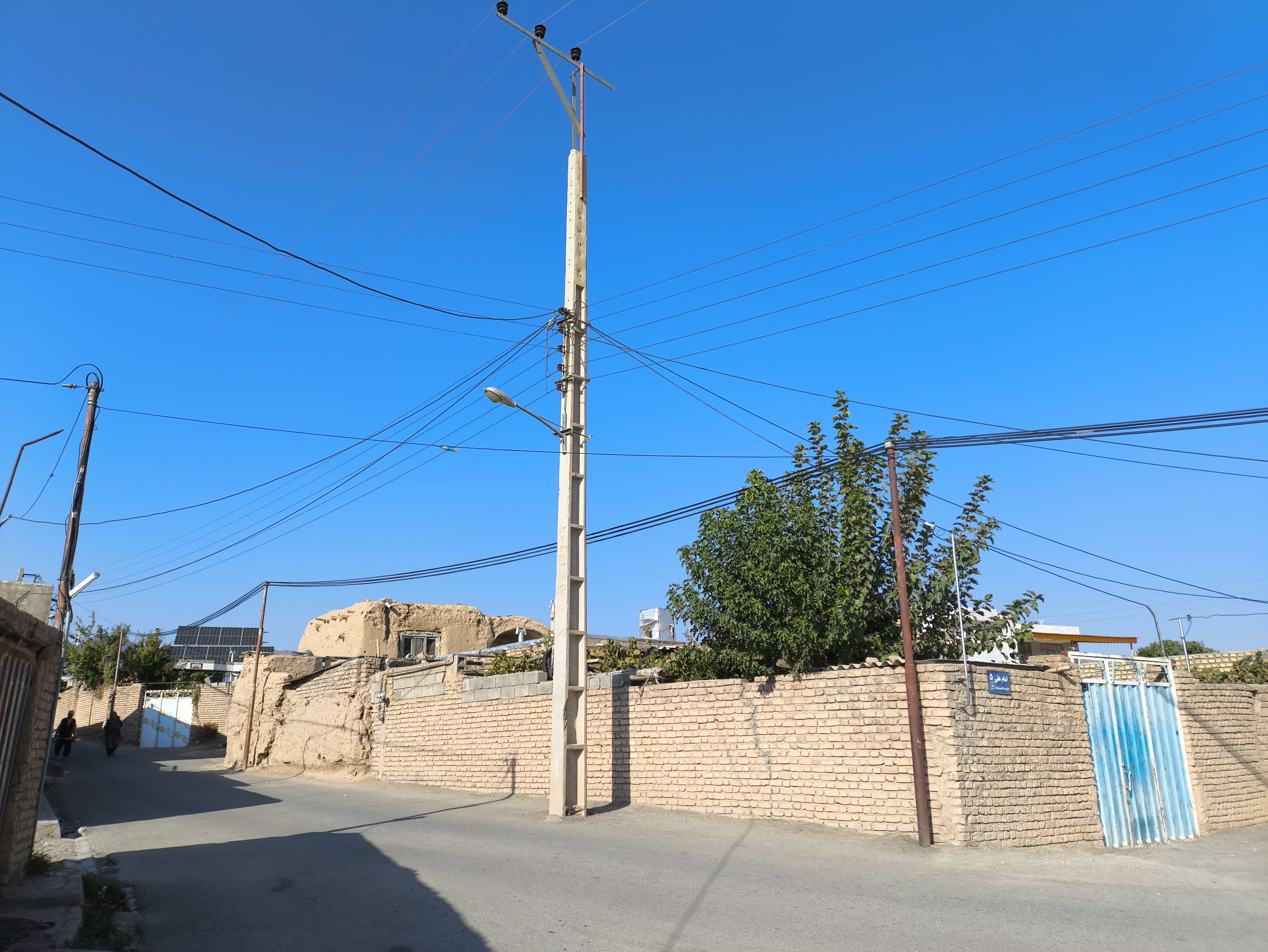
Nay, Iran in 2024

Nay (Persian: ناي) (Note: Also romanized as Nāy) is a village in Qaleh-ye Bala Rural District of Farah Dasht District in Kashmar County, Razavi Khorasan province, Iran.

== Demographics ==
=== Population ===
At the time of the 2006 National Census, the village's population was 862 in 259 households, when it was in Bala Velayat Rural District of the Central District. The following census in 2011 counted 715 people in 265 households. The 2016 census measured the population of the village as 708 people in 254 households.

In 2019, Nay was transferred to Qaleh-ye Bala Rural District created in the new Farah Dasht District.
