= Bahariyeh, Razavi Khorasan =

Village in Razavi Khorasan province, Iran

Bahariyeh Persian: بهاريه
- Village
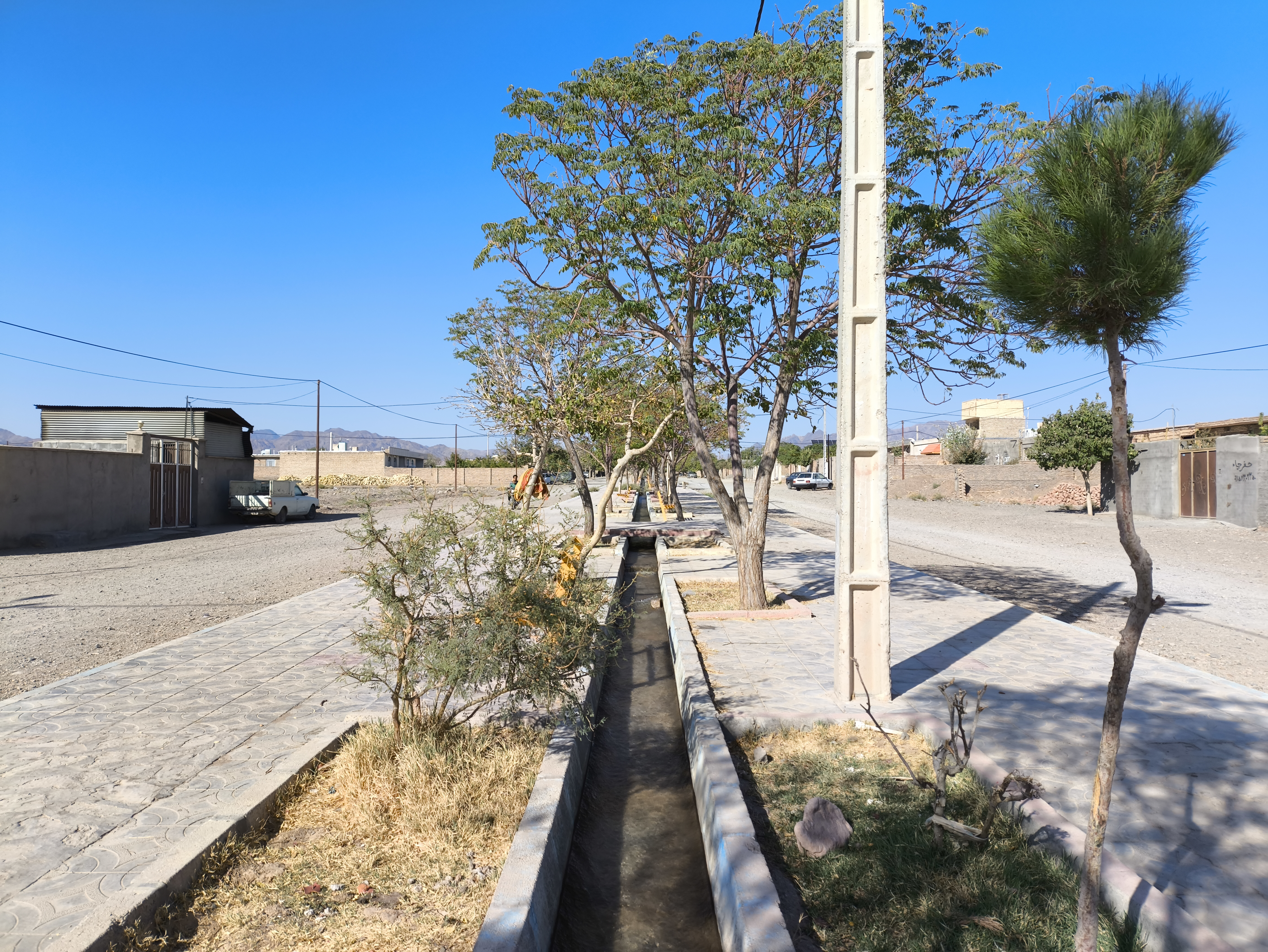
- Street in the village of Bahariyeh

- Location within Iran
- Coordinates: 35°14′17″N 58°39′10″E
- Country: Iran
- Province: Razavi Khorasan
- County: Kashmar
- District: Farah Dasht
- Rural District: Qaleh-ye Bala

Population (2016)
  - Total: 125
- Time zone: UTC+3:30 (IRST)

Bahariyeh (Persian: بهاريه) (Note: Also romanized as Bahārīyeh) is a village in Qaleh-ye Bala Rural District of Farah Dasht District in Kashmar County, Razavi Khorasan province, Iran.

== Demographics ==
=== Population ===
At the time of the 2006 National Census, the village's population was 115 in 29 households, when it was in Bala Velayat Rural District of the Central District. The following census in 2011 counted 127 people in 35 households. The 2016 census measured the population of the village as 125 people in 43 households.

In 2019, Bahariyeh was transferred to Qaleh-ye Bala Rural District created in the new Farah Dasht District.
