= Farsheh =

Village in Razavi Khorasan province, Iran

Farsheh Persian: فرشه
- Village
- Location within Iran
- Coordinates: 35°16′19″N 58°45′02″E
- Country: Iran
- Province: Razavi Khorasan
- County: Kashmar
- District: Farah Dasht
- Rural District: Qaleh-ye Bala

Population (2016)
  - Total: 634
- Time zone: UTC+3:30 (IRST)

Farsheh (Persian: فرشه) is a village in Qaleh-ye Bala Rural District of Farah Dasht District in Kashmar County, Razavi Khorasan province, Iran.

== Demographics ==
=== Population ===
At the time of the 2006 National Census, the village's population was 756 in 242 households, when it was in Bala Velayat Rural District of the Central District. The following census in 2011 counted 677 people in 235 households. The 2016 census measured the population of the village as 634 people in 252 households.

In 2019, Farsheh was transferred to Qaleh-ye Bala Rural District created in the new Farah Dasht District.
