= Hajj Rajab =

Village in Razavi Khorasan province, Iran

Hajj Rajab Persian: حاج رجب
- Village
- Location within Iran
- Coordinates: 35°09′52″N 58°38′57″E
- Country: Iran
- Province: Razavi Khorasan
- County: Kashmar
- District: Farah Dasht
- Rural District: Qaleh-ye Bala

Population (2016)
  - Total: Below reporting threshold
- Time zone: UTC+3:30 (IRST)

Hajj Rajab (Persian: حاج رجب, also Romanized as Ḩājj Rajab; also known as Ḩājjī Rajab and Kalāteh-ye Ḩājjī Rajab) is a village in Qaleh-ye Bala Rural District of Farah Dasht District in Kashmar County, Razavi Khorasan province, Iran.

== Demographics ==
=== Population ===
At the time of the 2006 National Census, the village's population was 135 in 30 households, when it was in Bala Velayat Rural District of the Central District. The following census in 2011 counted 37 people in 12 households. The 2016 census measured the population of the village as below the reporting threshold.

In 2019, Hajj Rajab was transferred to Qaleh-ye Bala Rural District created in the new Farah Dasht District.
