= Rezqabad, Razavi Khorasan =

Village in Razavi Khorasan province, Iran

Rezqabad Persian: رزق‌آباد
- Village
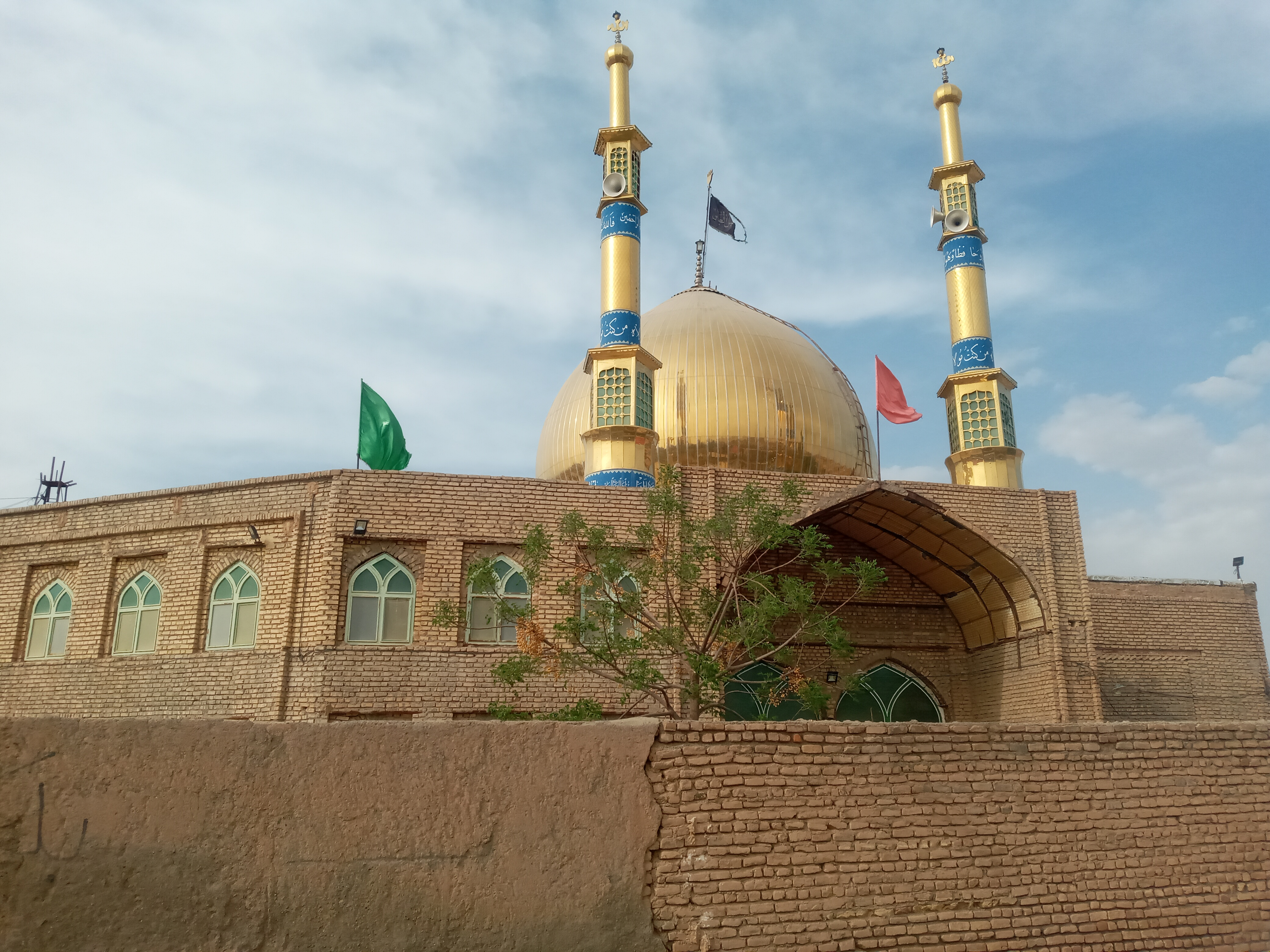
- A mosque at Rezqabad

- Location within Iran
- Coordinates: 35°13′34″N 58°32′05″E
- Country: Iran
- Province: Razavi Khorasan
- County: Kashmar
- District: Farah Dasht
- Rural District: Rezqabad

Population (2016)
  - Total: 2,704
- Time zone: UTC+3:30 (IRST)

Rezqabad (Persian: رزق‌آباد) (Note: Also romanized as Rezqābād) is a village in, and the capital of, Rezqabad Rural District in Farah Dasht District of Kashmar County, Razavi Khorasan province, Iran.

== Demographics ==
=== Population ===
At the time of the 2006 National Census, the village's population was 2,394 in 648 households, when it was in Bala Velayat Rural District of the Central District. The following census in 2011 counted 2,590 people in 791 households. The 2016 census measured the population of the village as 2,704 people in 858 households.

In 2019, Rezqabad was transferred to Rezqabad Rural District created in the new Farah Dasht District.
