= Arefabad, Razavi Khorasan =

Village in Razavi Khorasan province, Iran

Arefabad Persian: عارف اباد
- Village
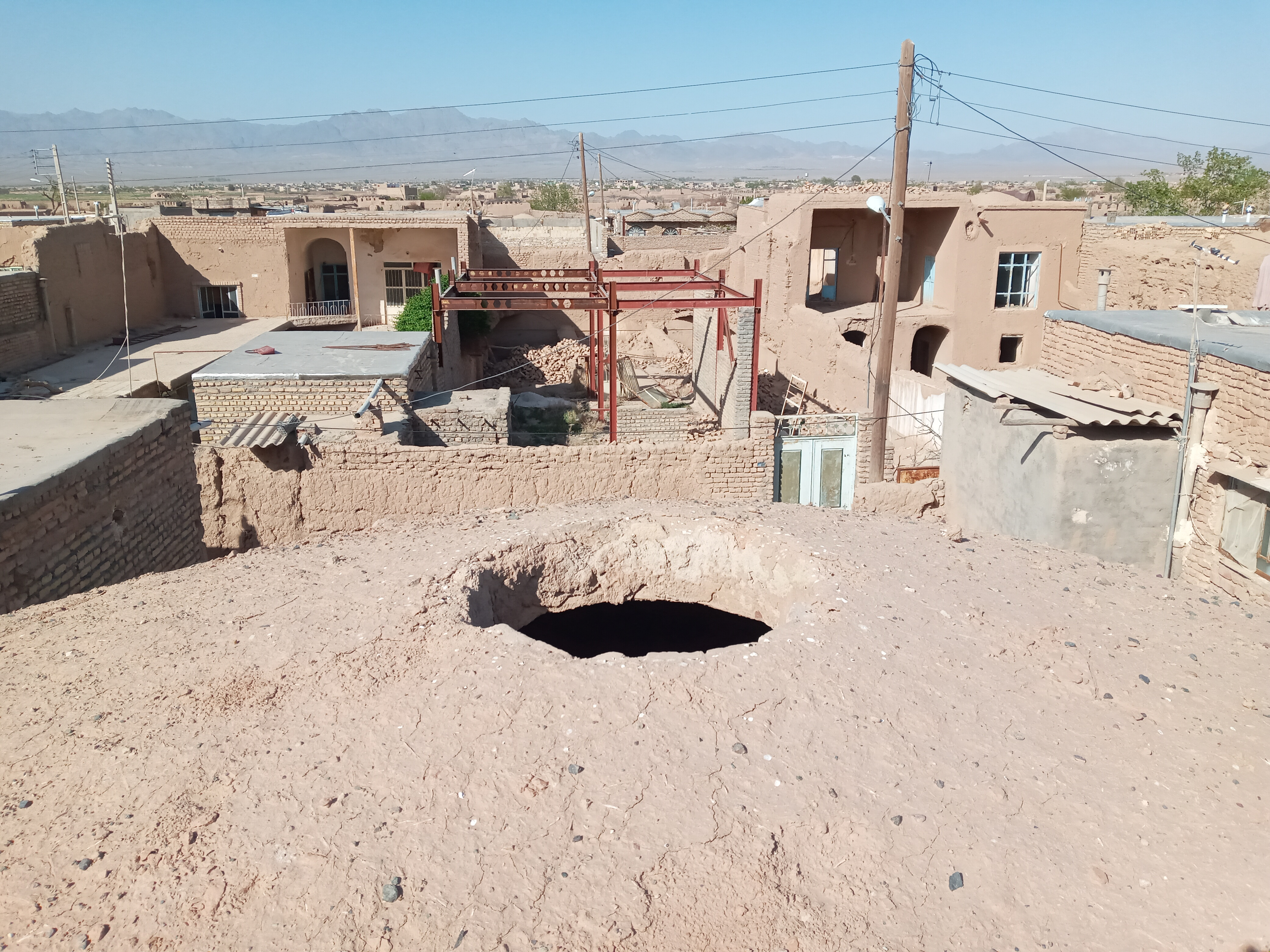
- The village of Arefabad in 2022

- Location within Iran
- Coordinates: 35°12′20″N 58°32′56″E
- Country: Iran
- Province: Razavi Khorasan
- County: Kashmar
- District: Farah Dasht
- Rural District: Rezqabad

Population (2016)
  - Total: 2,142
- Time zone: UTC+3:30 (IRST)

Arefabad (Persian: عارف اباد) (Note: Also romanized as ‘Ārefābād; also known as Kalāteh-ye ‘Abd ol Reẕā) is a village in Rezqabad Rural District of Farah Dasht District in Kashmar County, Razavi Khorasan province, Iran.

== Demographics ==
=== Population ===
At the time of the 2006 National Census, the village's population was 2,016 in 514 households, when it was in Bala Velayat Rural District of the Central District. The following census in 2011 counted 2,182 people in 628 households. The 2016 census measured the population of the village as 2,142 people in 652 households.

In 2019, Arefabad was transferred to Rezqabad Rural District created in the new Farah Dasht District.
