= Arefabad =

Arefabad (Persian: عارف اباد) may refer to:

- Arefabad, Razavi Khorasan
- Arefabad, Chabahar, Sistan and Baluchestan Province
- Arefabad, Zahedan, Sistan and Baluchestan Province
