= Quzhd, Kashmar =

Village in Razavi Khorasan province, Iran

Quzhd Persian: قوژد
- Village
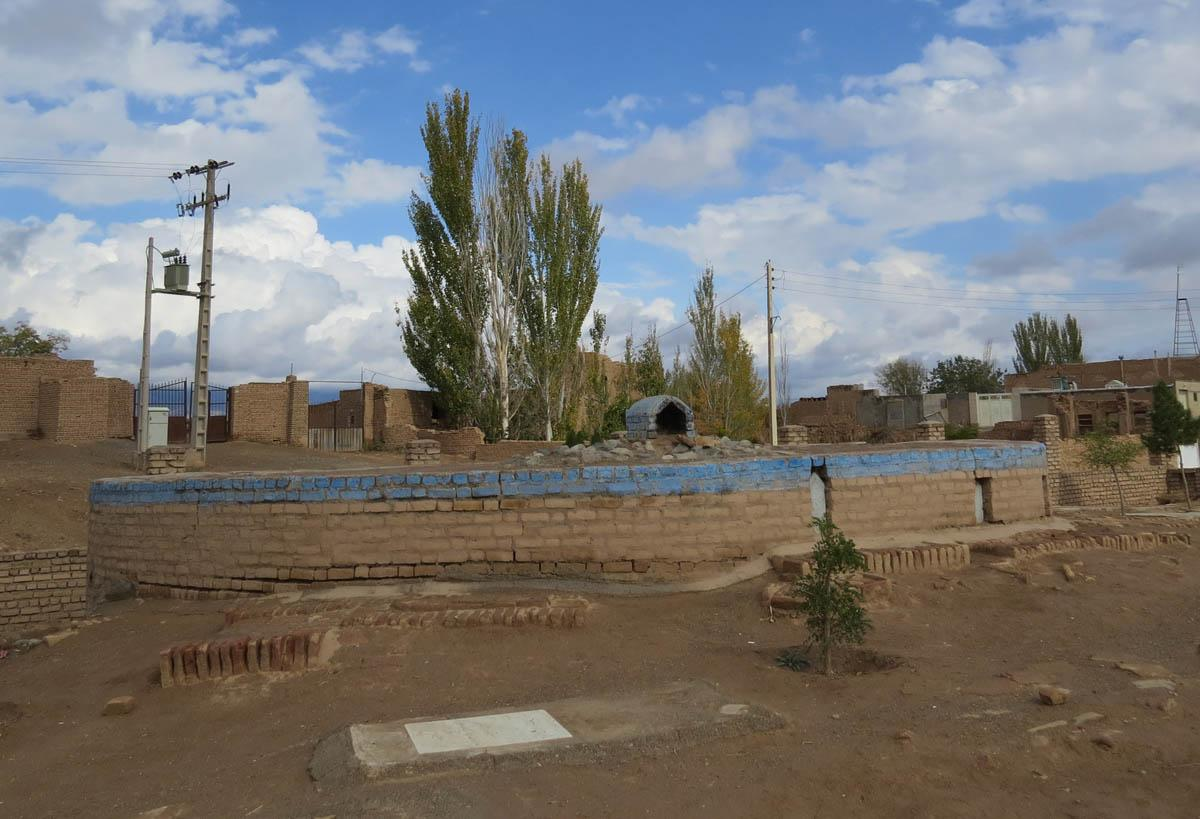
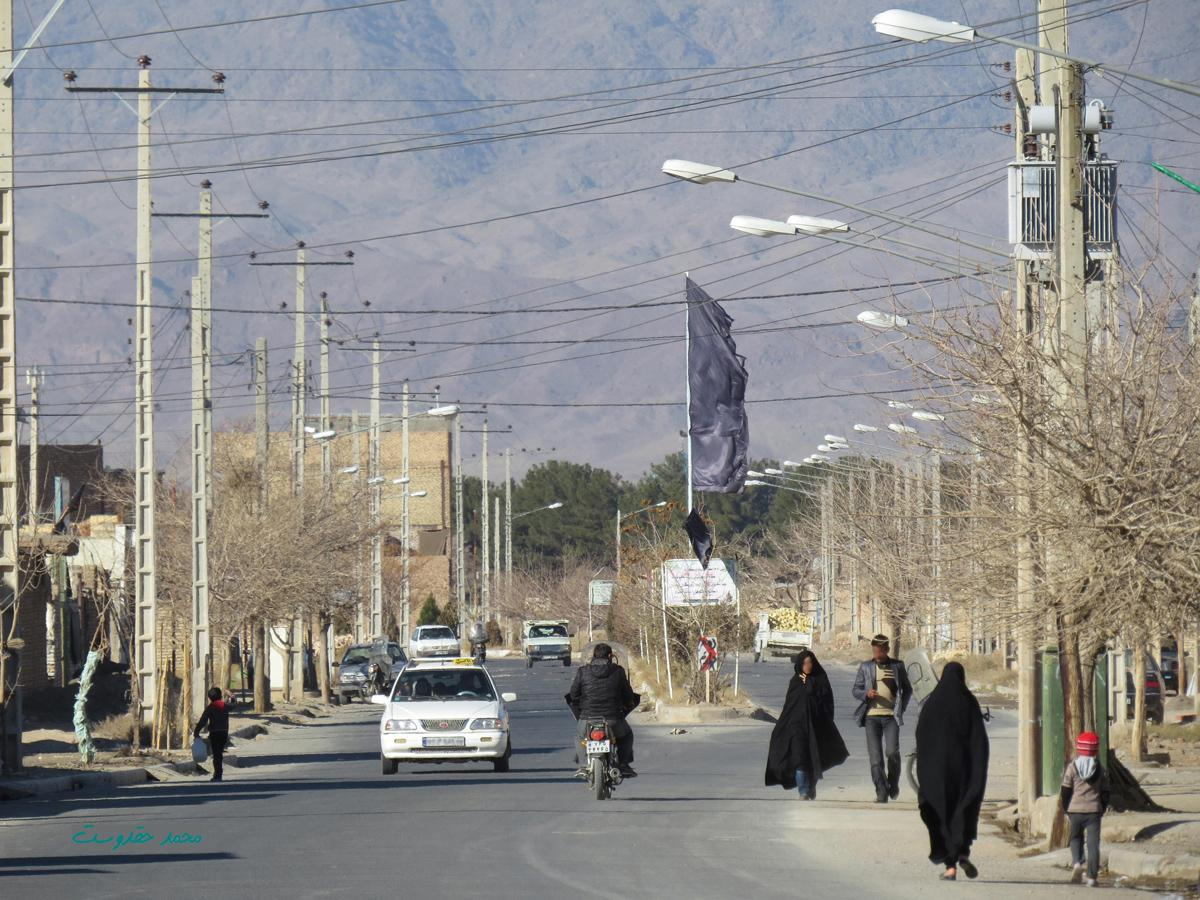
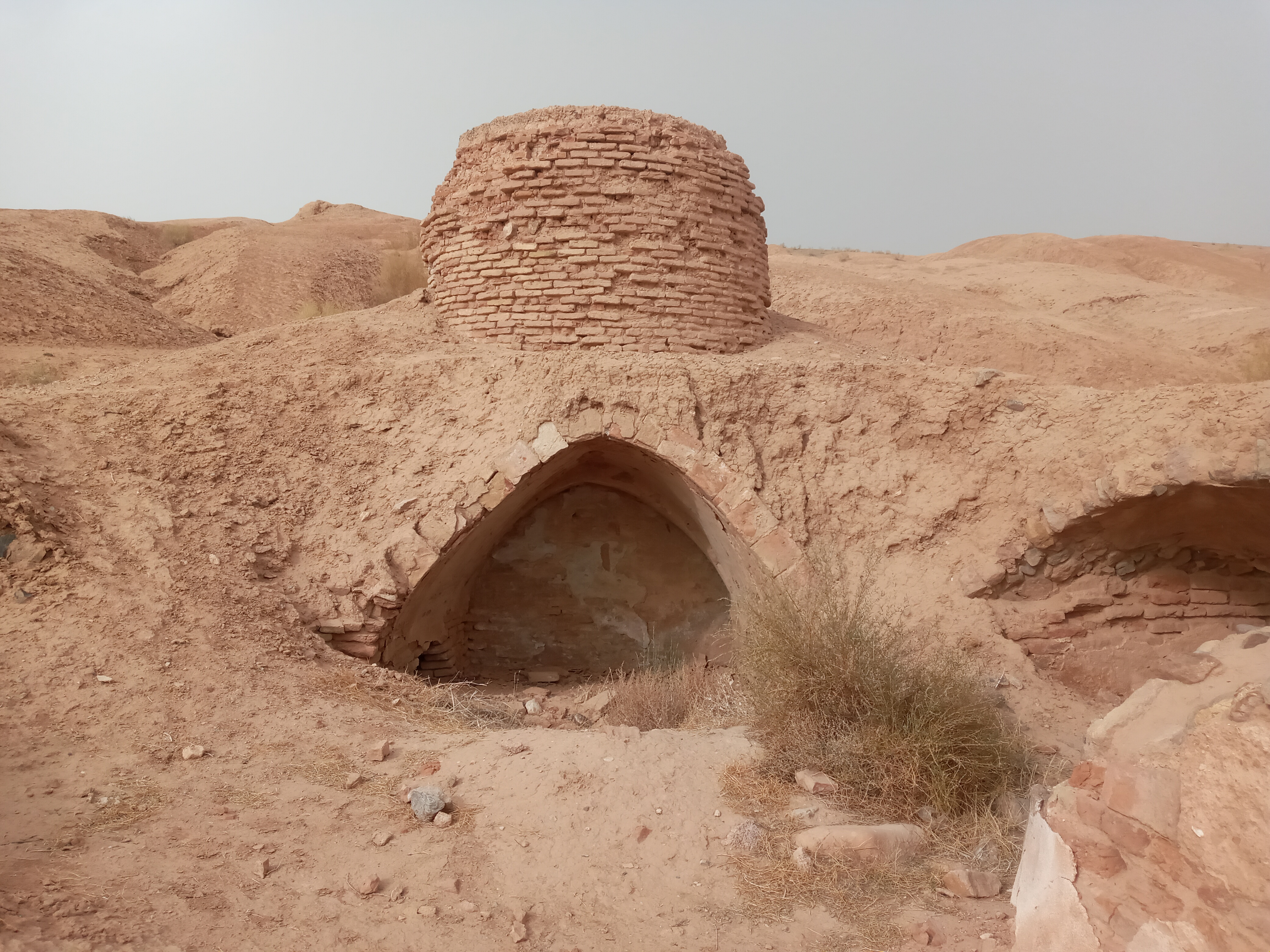
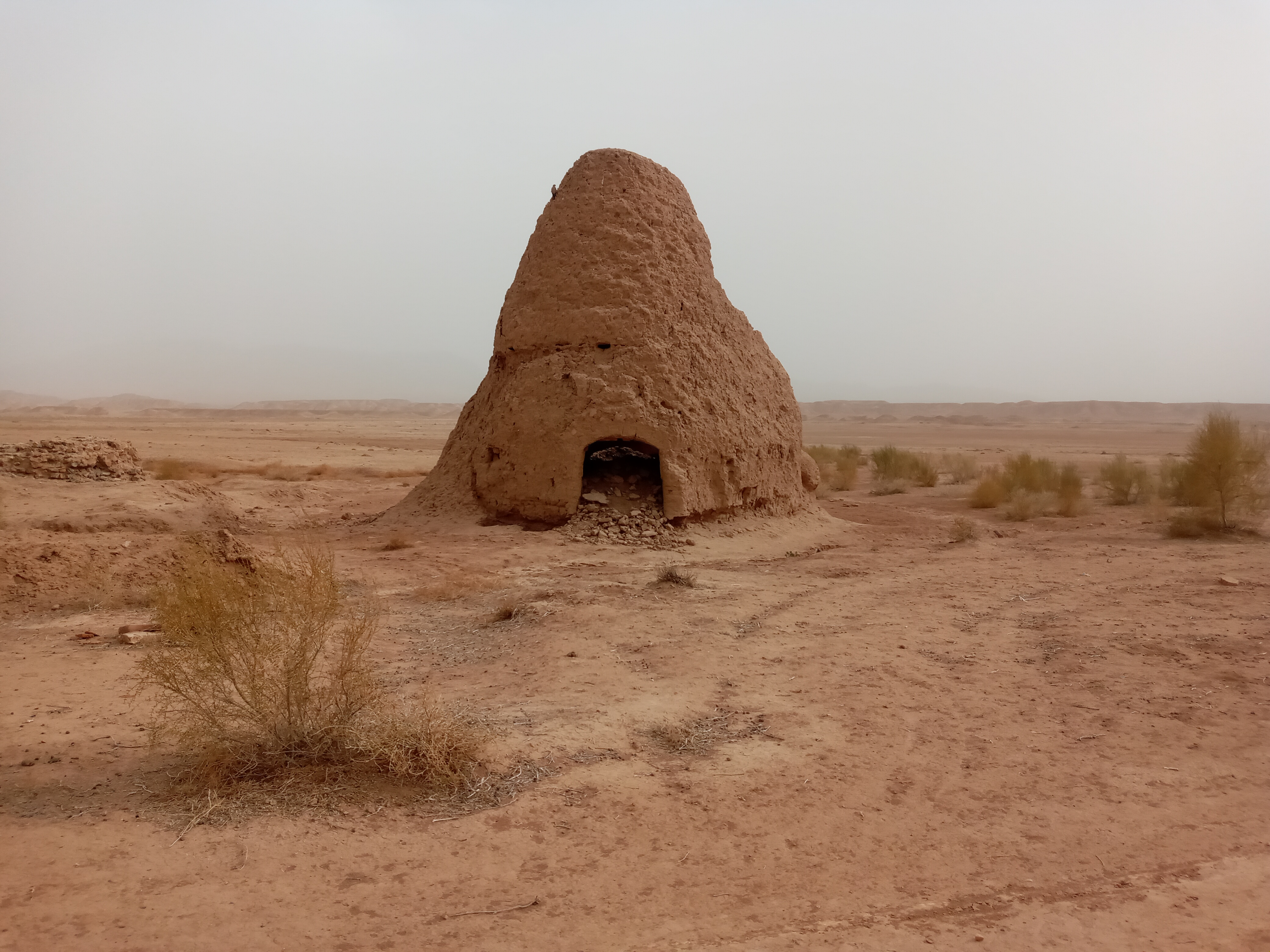
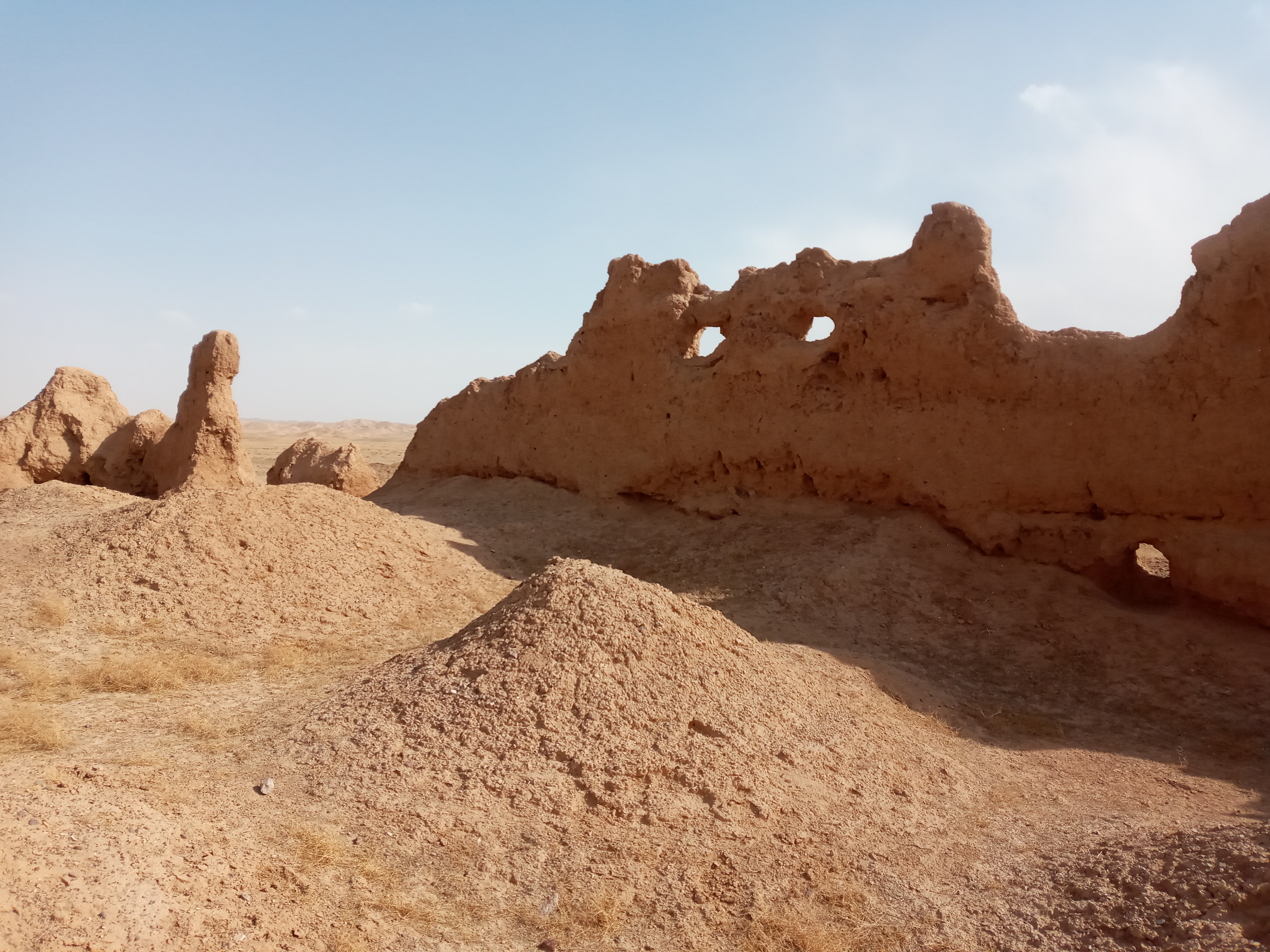
- From up: Grave of Pir Quzhd, Talaabad Watermill, Village road, Talaabad Chahartaq, Yakhdan of Talaabad, Rig Castle.

- Location within Iran
- Coordinates: 35°12′23″N 58°27′37″E
- Country: Iran
- Province: Razavi Khorasan
- County: Kashmar
- District: Central
- Rural District: Bala Velayat

Population (2016)
  - Total: 4,650
- Time zone: UTC+3:30 (IRST)

Quzhd (Persian: قوژد) (Note: Also romanized as Qūzhd) is a village in, and the capital of Bala Velayat Rural District in the Central District of Kashmar County, Razavi Khorasan province, Iran. The previous capital of the rural district was the village of Farahabad, (Note: Also known as Qaleh-ye Bala) now a neighborhood in the city of Farg Qaleh.

== Demographics ==
=== Population ===
At the time of the 2006 National Census, the village's population was 4,024 in 1,087 households. The following census in 2011 counted 4,344 people in 1,281 households. The 2016 census measured the population of the village as 4,650 people in 1,435 households, the most populous in its rural district.

== Historical sites, ancient artifacts and tourism ==
=== Grave of Pir Quzhd ===
Grave of Pir Quzhd is a historical Grave related to the Before the 11th century AH and is located in Quzhd, Razavi Khorasan province.

=== Rig Castle ===
Rig castle is a Castle related to the Seljuq dynasty and is located in the Kashmar County, Quzhd village.

=== Talaabad Watermill ===
Talaabad Watermill is a Watermill related to the late Safavid period and is located in Kashmar County, Central District, Quzhd village.

=== Qanats of Quzhd ===
The Qanats of Quzhd is a historical Qanat is located in Quzhd in Kashmar County.
