= Farahabad, Kashmar =

Neighborhood in Razavi Khorasan province, Iran

Farahabad Persian: فرح اباد
- Neighborhood
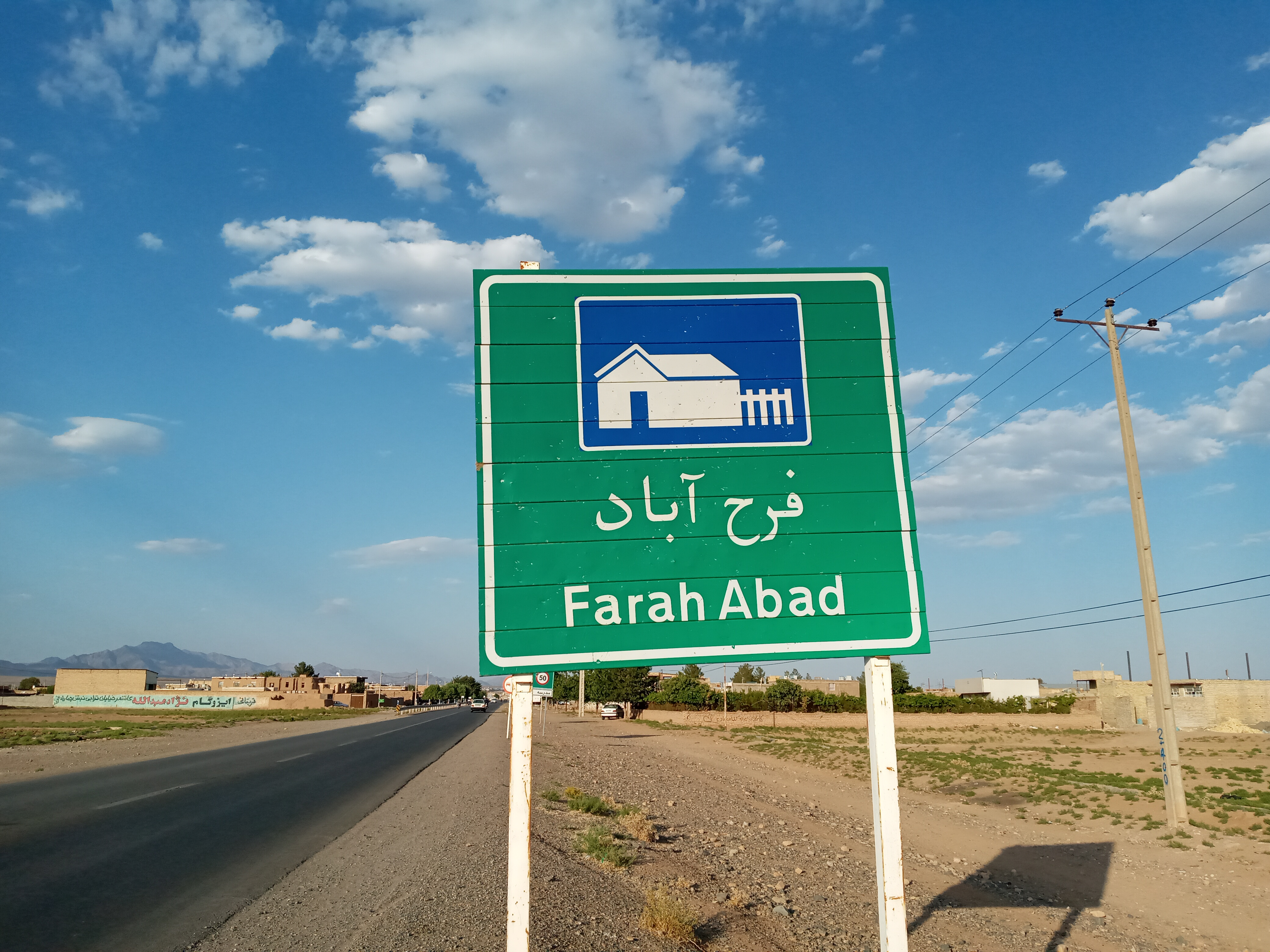

- Location within Iran
- Coordinates: 35°13′02″N 58°33′34″E
- Country: Iran
- Province: Razavi Khorasan
- County: Kashmar
- District: Farah Dasht
- City: Farg Qaleh

Population (2016)
  - Total: 2,385
- Time zone: UTC+3:30 (IRST)

Farahabad (Persian: فرح اباد) (Note: Also romanized as Faraḩābād; also known as Qal‘eh-ye Bālā (قلعه بالا)) is a neighborhood in the city of Farg Qaleh in Farah Dasht District of Kashmar County, Razavi Khorasan province, Iran. As a village, it was the capital of Bala Velayat Rural District until its capital was transferred to the village of Quzhd. Farahabad was then the capital of Qaleh-ye Bala Rural District until its capital was transferred to the village of Jordavi.

== Demographics ==
=== Population ===
At the time of the 2006 National Census, Farahabad's population was 2,376 in 620 households, when it was in Bala Velayat Rural District of the Central District. The following census in 2011 counted 2,353 people in 723 households. The 2016 census measured the population of the village as 2,385 people in 748 households.

In 2019, Farahabad was transferred to Qaleh-ye Bala Rural District created in the new Farah Dasht District. In 2021, village was merged with the village of Farg (Note: Also known as Qaleh-ye Pain) to form the new village of Farg Qaleh, which was converted to a city the following year.
