= Torbeqan =

Village in Razavi Khorasan province, Iran

Torbeqan Persian: تربقان
- Village
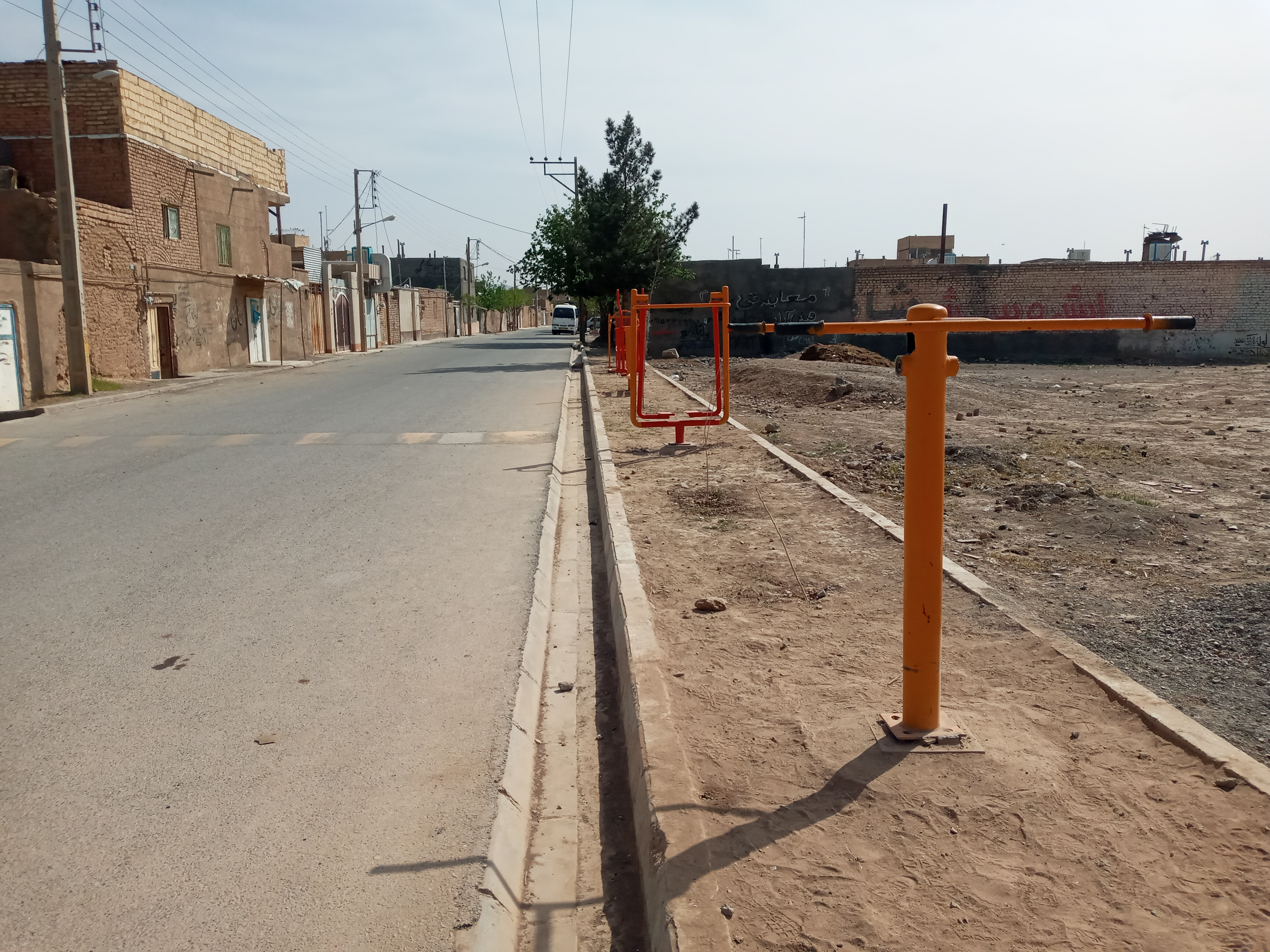
- Street in the village of Torbeqan

- Location within Iran
- Coordinates: 35°12′51″N 58°30′36″E
- Country: Iran
- Province: Razavi Khorasan
- County: Kashmar
- District: Central
- Rural District: Bala Velayat

Population (2016)
  - Total: 1,795
- Time zone: UTC+3:30 (IRST)

Torbeqan (Persian: تربقان) (Note: Also romanized as Torbeqān) is a village in Bala Velayat Rural District of the Central District in Kashmar County, Razavi Khorasan province, Iran.

== Demographics ==
=== Population ===
At the time of the 2006 National Census, the village's population was 1,515 in 420 households. The following census in 2011 counted 1,735 people in 535 households. The 2016 census measured the population of the village as 1,795 people in 566 households.
