= Talabad, Kashmar =

Village in Razavi Khorasan province, Iran

Talabad Persian: تل اباد
- Village
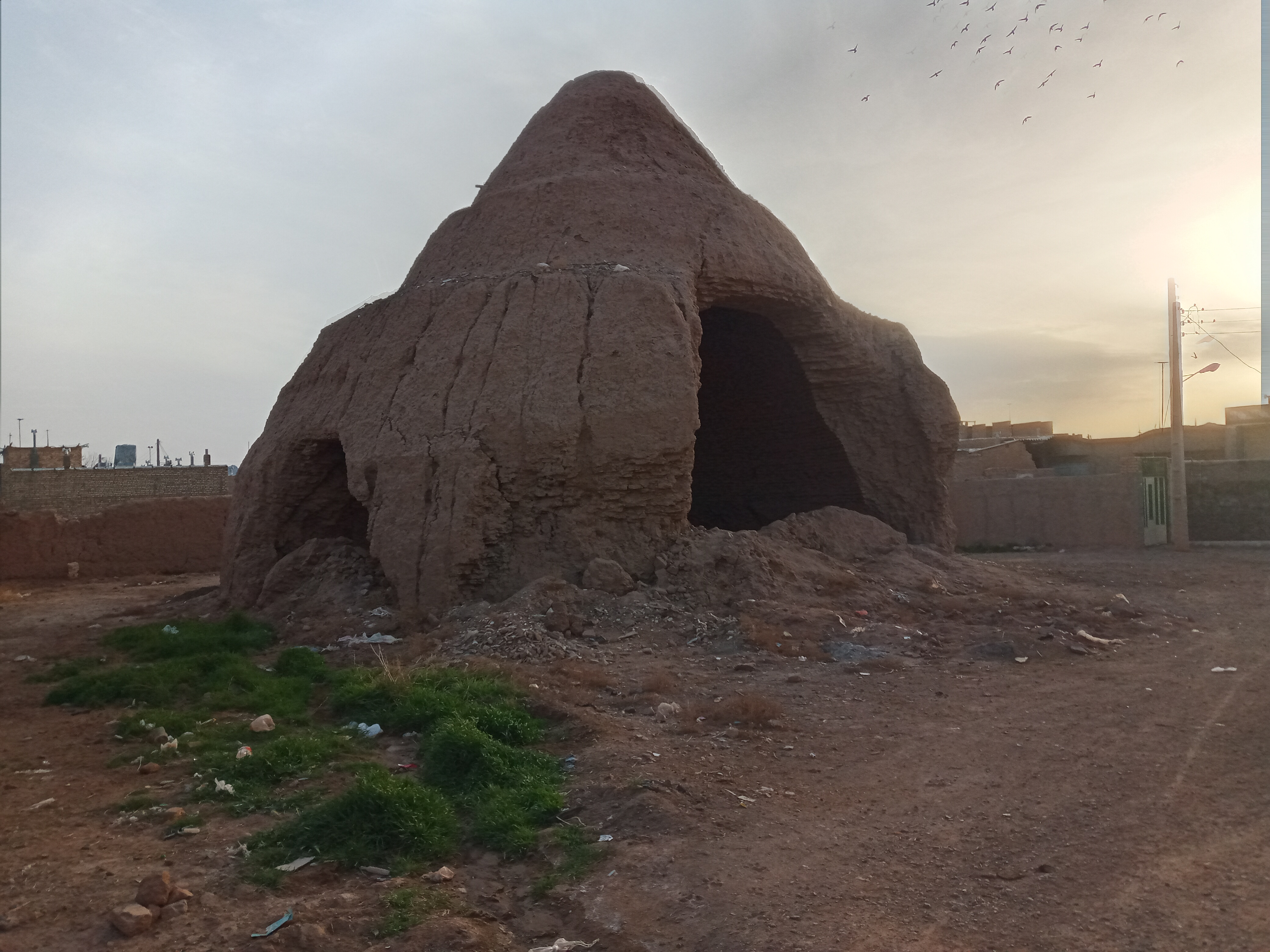
- Yakhdan in the village of Talabad

- Location within Iran
- Coordinates: 35°10′21″N 58°25′29″E
- Country: Iran
- Province: Razavi Khorasan
- County: Kashmar
- District: Central
- Rural District: Bala Velayat

Population (2016)
  - Total: 556
- Time zone: UTC+3:30 (IRST)

Talabad (Persian: تل اباد) (Note: Also romanized as Talābād; also known as Ţālebābād, Tilāābād, and Tīlehābād) is a village in Bala Velayat Rural District of the Central District in Kashmar County, Razavi Khorasan province, Iran.

== Demographics ==
=== Population ===
At the time of the 2006 National Census, the village's population was 620 in 141 households. The following census in 2011 counted 586 people in 154 households. The 2016 census measured the population of the village as 556 people in 150 households.
