= Fadafen =

Village in Razavi Khorasan province, Iran

Fadafen Persian: فدافن
- Village
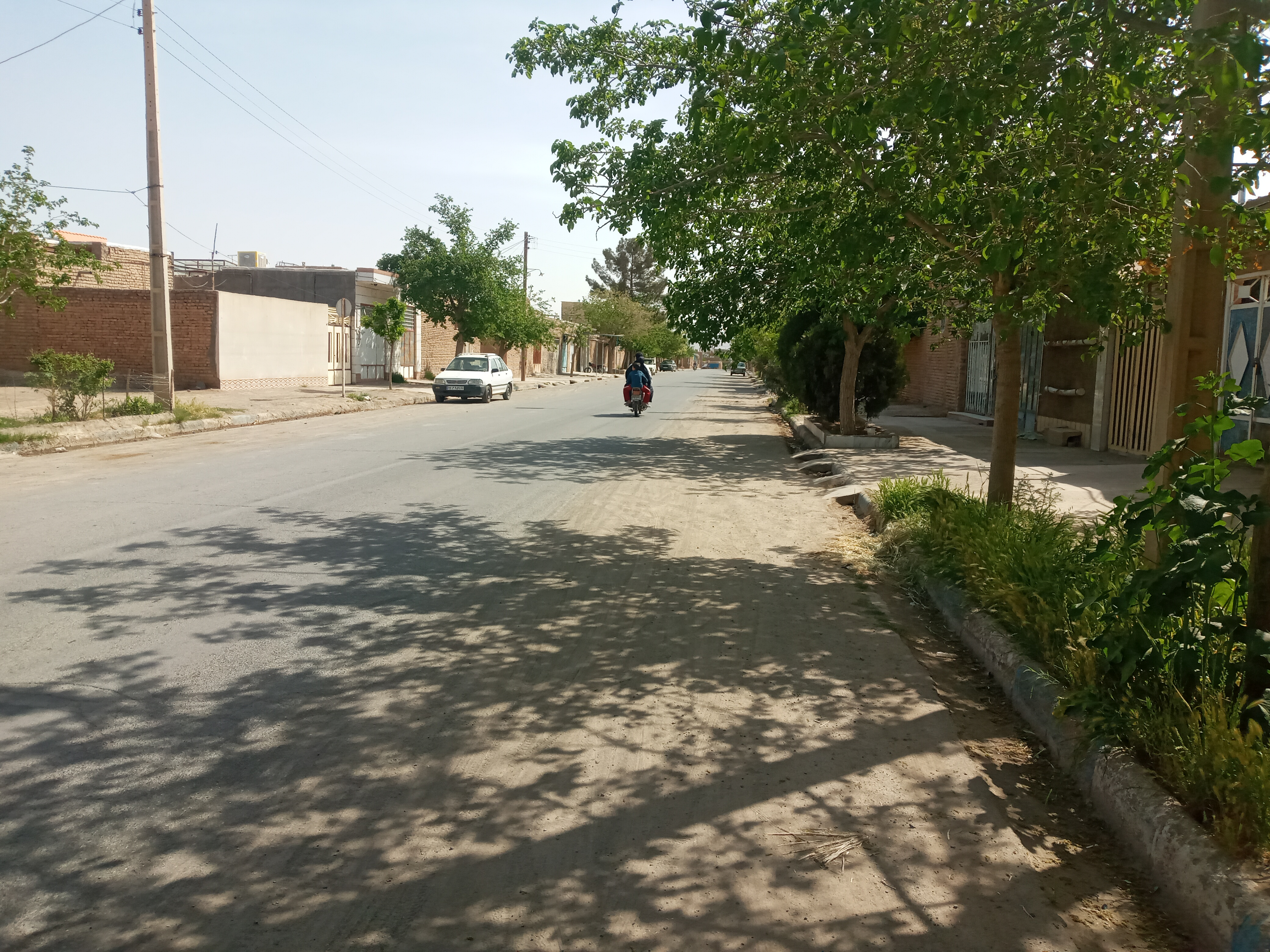
- Street in the village of Fadafen

- Location within Iran
- Coordinates: 35°12′22″N 58°29′46″E
- Country: Iran
- Province: Razavi Khorasan
- County: Kashmar
- District: Central
- Rural District: Bala Velayat

Population (2016)
  - Total: 4,473
- Time zone: UTC+3:30 (IRST)

Fadafen (Persian: فدافن) (Note: Also romanized as Fadāfen; also known as Fadāfin) is a village in Bala Velayat Rural District of the Central District in Kashmar County, Razavi Khorasan province, Iran.

== Demographics ==
=== Population ===
At the time of the 2006 National Census, the village's population was 3,731 in 1,009 households. The following census in 2011 counted 4,206 people in 1,274 households. The 2016 census measured the population of the village as 4,473 people in 1,379 households.
