= Eshaqabad, Kashmar =

Village in Razavi Khorasan province, Iran

Eshaqabad Persian: اسحاق اباد
- Village
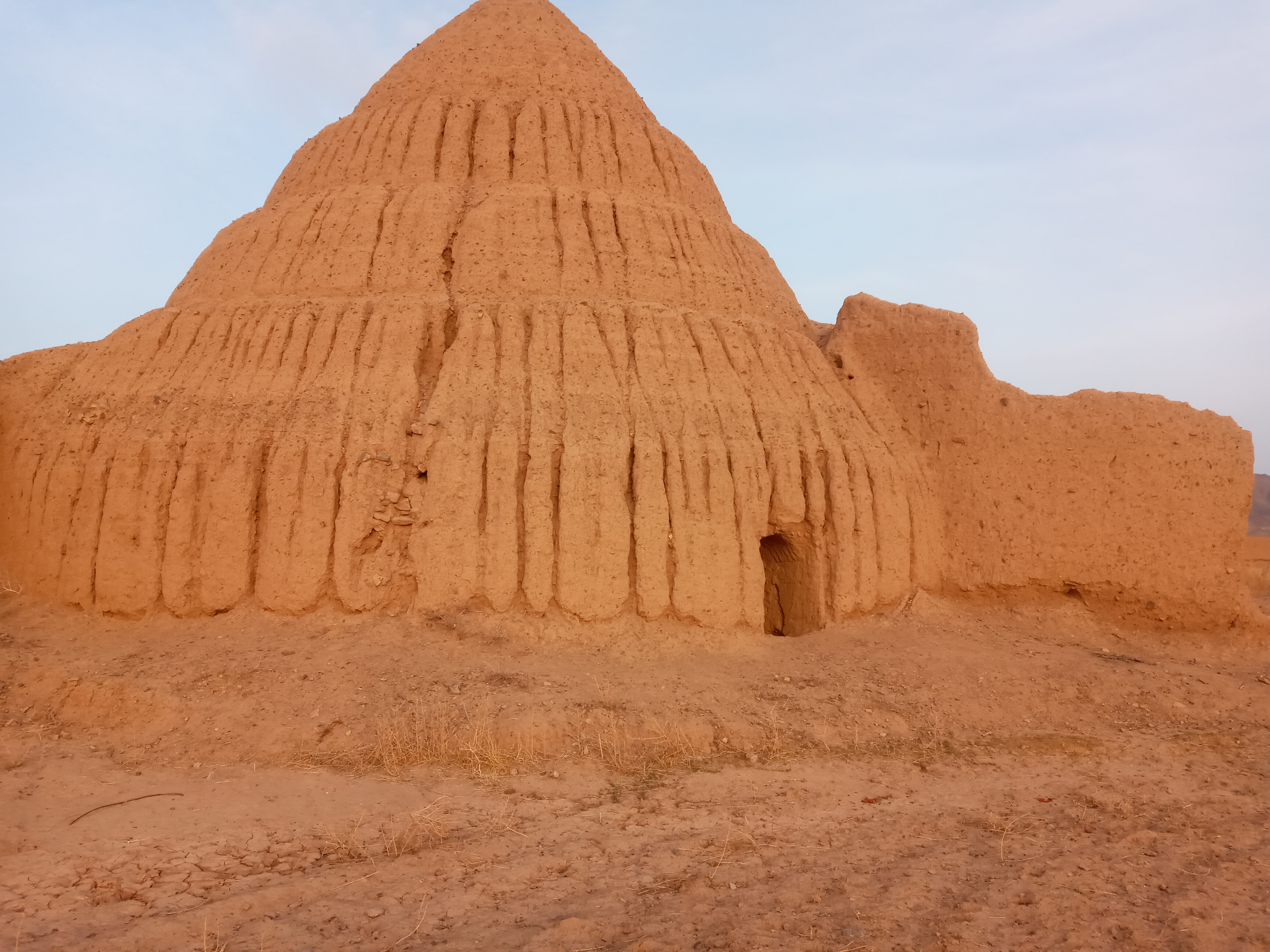
- Yakhdan in the village of Eshaqabad

- Location within Iran
- Coordinates: 35°09′42″N 58°26′36″E
- Country: Iran
- Province: Razavi Khorasan
- County: Kashmar
- District: Central
- Rural District: Bala Velayat

Population (2016)
  - Total: 670
- Time zone: UTC+3:30 (IRST)

Eshaqabad (Persian: اسحاق اباد) (Note: Also romanized as Esḩāqābād; also known as Is-Hāqabād, Sāghābād, and Sāqābād) is a village in Bala Velayat Rural District of the Central District in Kashmar County, Razavi Khorasan province, Iran.

== Demographics ==
=== Population ===
At the time of the 2006 National Census, the village's population was 674 in 167 households. The following census in 2011 counted 623 people in 177 households. The 2016 census measured the population of the village as 670 people in 200 households.
