= Forutqeh =

Village in Razavi Khorasan province, Iran

Forutqeh Persian: فروتقه
- Village
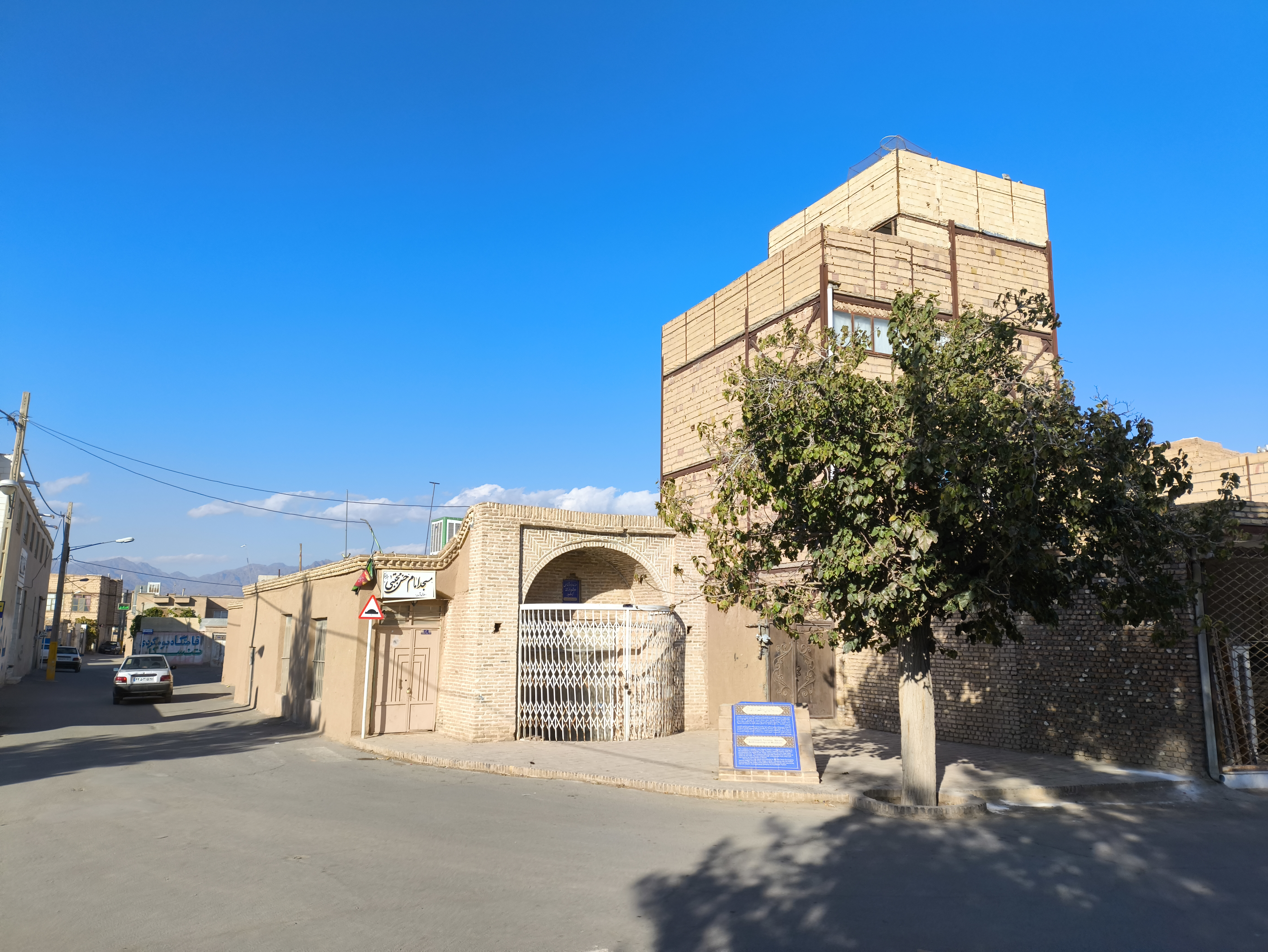

- Location within Iran
- Coordinates: 35°13′12″N 58°29′57″E
- Country: Iran
- Province: Razavi Khorasan
- County: Kashmar
- District: Central
- Rural District: Bala Velayat

Population (2016)
  - Total: 3,281
- Time zone: UTC+3:30 (IRST)

Forutqeh (Persian: فروتقه) (Note: Also romanized as Forūtqeh) is a village in Bala Velayat Rural District of the Central District in Kashmar County, Razavi Khorasan province, Iran.

== Demographics ==
=== Population ===
At the time of the 2006 National Census, the village's population was 2,657 in 739 households. The following census in 2011 counted 3,277 people in 1,012 households. The 2016 census measured the population of the village as 3,281 people in 1,051 households.
