= Rig Castle =

- قلعه ریگ
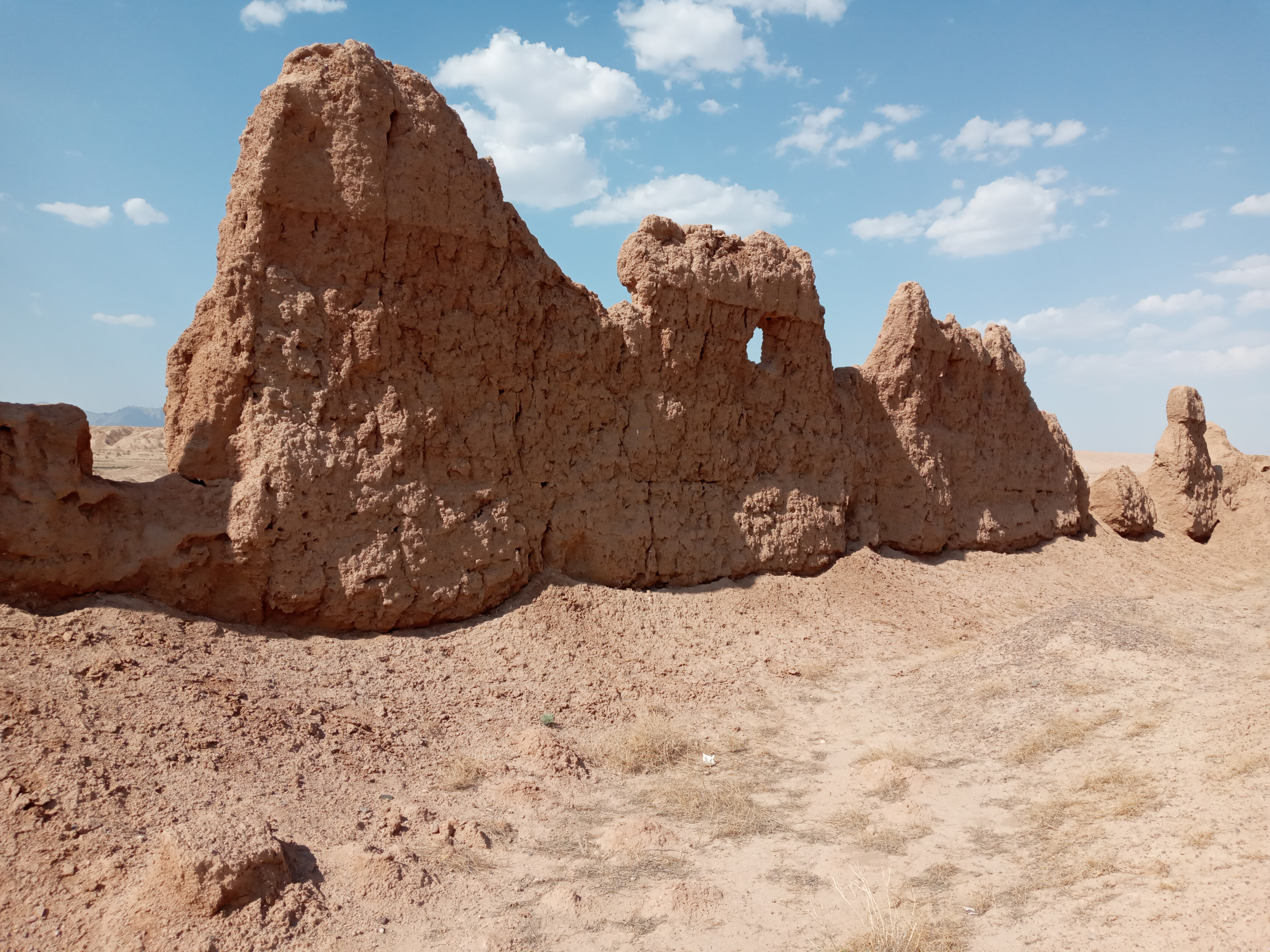
- Interactive map of the Rig Castle area

General information
- Status: Ruined
- Type: Castle
- Architectural style: Iranian
- Location: Quzhd, Khorasan Razavi، Kashmar، Quzhd, Iran
- Coordinates: 35.1811°N 58.454278°E

Rig Castle (Persian: قلعه ریگ) is a Castle related to the Seljuq dynasty and is located in the Kashmar County, Quzhd village.
