= Gandabar =

Village in Razavi Khorasan province, Iran

Gandabar Persian: گندبر
- Village
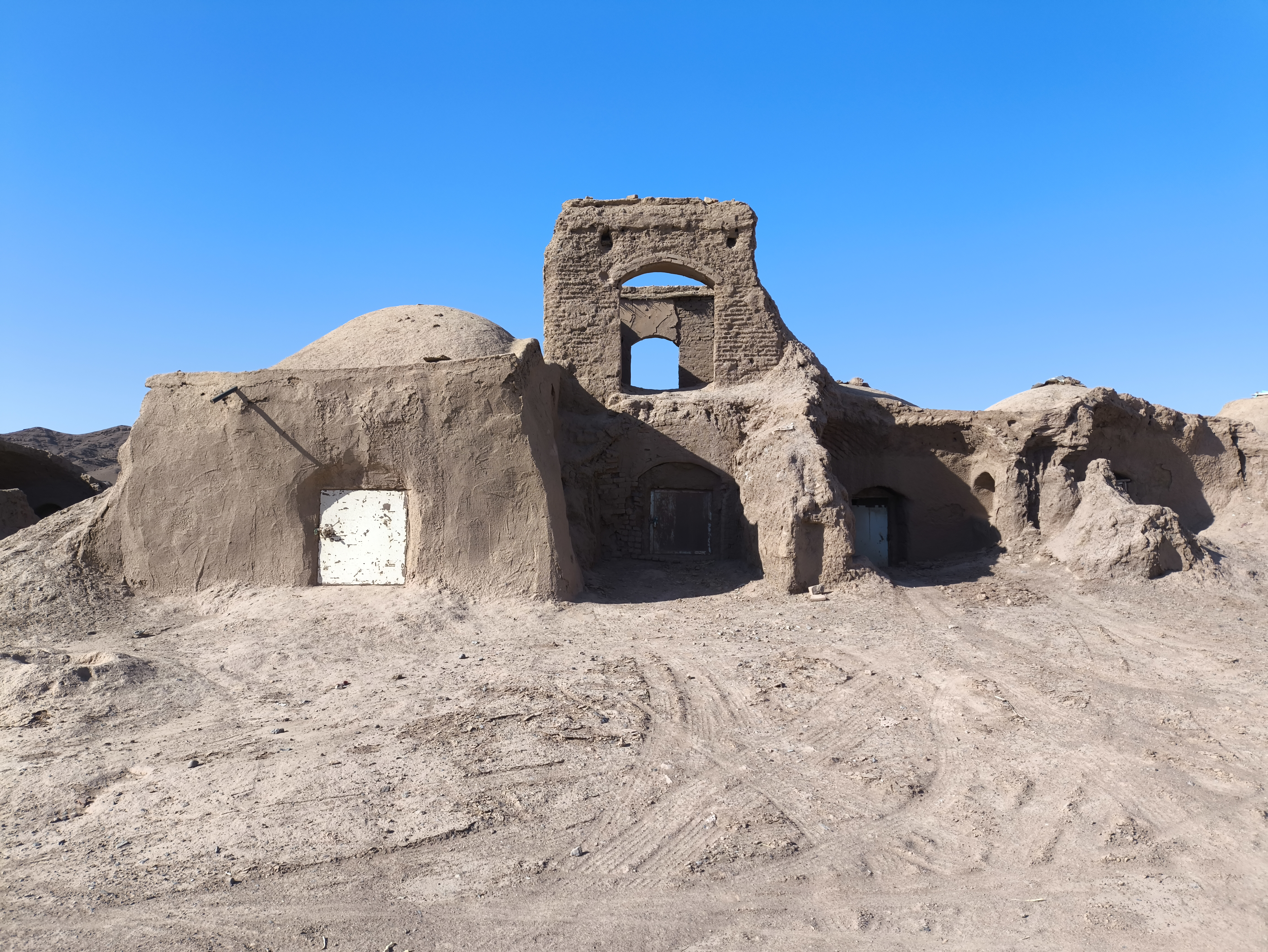
- The village of Gandabar

- Location within Iran
- Coordinates: 35°02′03″N 58°26′33″E
- Country: Iran
- Province: Razavi Khorasan
- County: Kashmar
- District: Central
- Rural District: Bala Velayat

Population (2016)
  - Total: 227
- Time zone: UTC+3:30 (IRST)

Gandabar (Persian: گندبر) is a village in Bala Velayat Rural District of the Central District in Kashmar County, Razavi Khorasan province, Iran.

== Demographics ==
=== Population ===
At the time of the 2006 National Census, the village's population was 172 in 43 households. The following census in 2011 counted 167 people in 40 households. The 2016 census measured the population of the village as 227 people in 58 households.
