= Rezqabad Rural District (Kashmar County) =

Rural district in Razavi Khorasan province, Iran

Rezqabad Rural District Persian: دهستان رزق‌آباد
- Rural District
- Location within Iran
- Coordinates: 35°17′N 58°37′E
- Country: Iran
- Province: Razavi Khorasan
- County: Kashmar
- District: Farah Dasht
- Established: 2019
- Capital: Rezqabad
- Time zone: UTC+3:30 (IRST)

Rezqabad Rural District (Persian: دهستان رزق‌آباد) is in Farah Dasht District of Kashmar County, Razavi Khorasan province, Iran. Its capital is the village of Rezqabad, whose population at the time of the 2016 National Census was 2,704 in 858 households.

In 2019, Farah Dasht District was formed, and Rezqabad Rural District was created in the new district.

== Other villages in the rural district ==
- Arefabad
- Kazhghuneh
- Quch Palang
