= Qaleh-ye Bala Rural District =

Rural district in Razavi Khorasan province, Iran

Qaleh-ye Bala Rural District Persian: دهستان قلعه بالا
- Rural District
- Location within Iran
- Coordinates: 35°16′N 58°40′E
- Country: Iran
- Province: Razavi Khorasan
- County: Kashmar
- District: Farah Dasht
- Established: 2019
- Capital: Jordavi
- Time zone: UTC+3:30 (IRST)

Qaleh-ye Bala Rural District (Persian: دهستان قلعه بالا) is in Farah Dasht District of Kashmar County, Razavi Khorasan province, Iran. Its capital is the village of Jordavi, whose population at the time of the 2016 National Census was 931 people in 269 households. The previous capital of the rural district was the village of Farahabad, (Note: Also known as Qaleh-ye Bala) now a neighborhood in the city of Farg Qaleh.

== History ==
Farah Dasht District was formed in 2019, and Qaleh-ye Bala Rural District was created in the new district.

== Other villages in the rural district ==
- Bahariyeh
- Farsheh
- Hajj Rajab
- Nay
