= Farg Qaleh =

City in Razavi Khorasan province, Iran

Farg Qaleh Persian: فرگ قلعه
- City
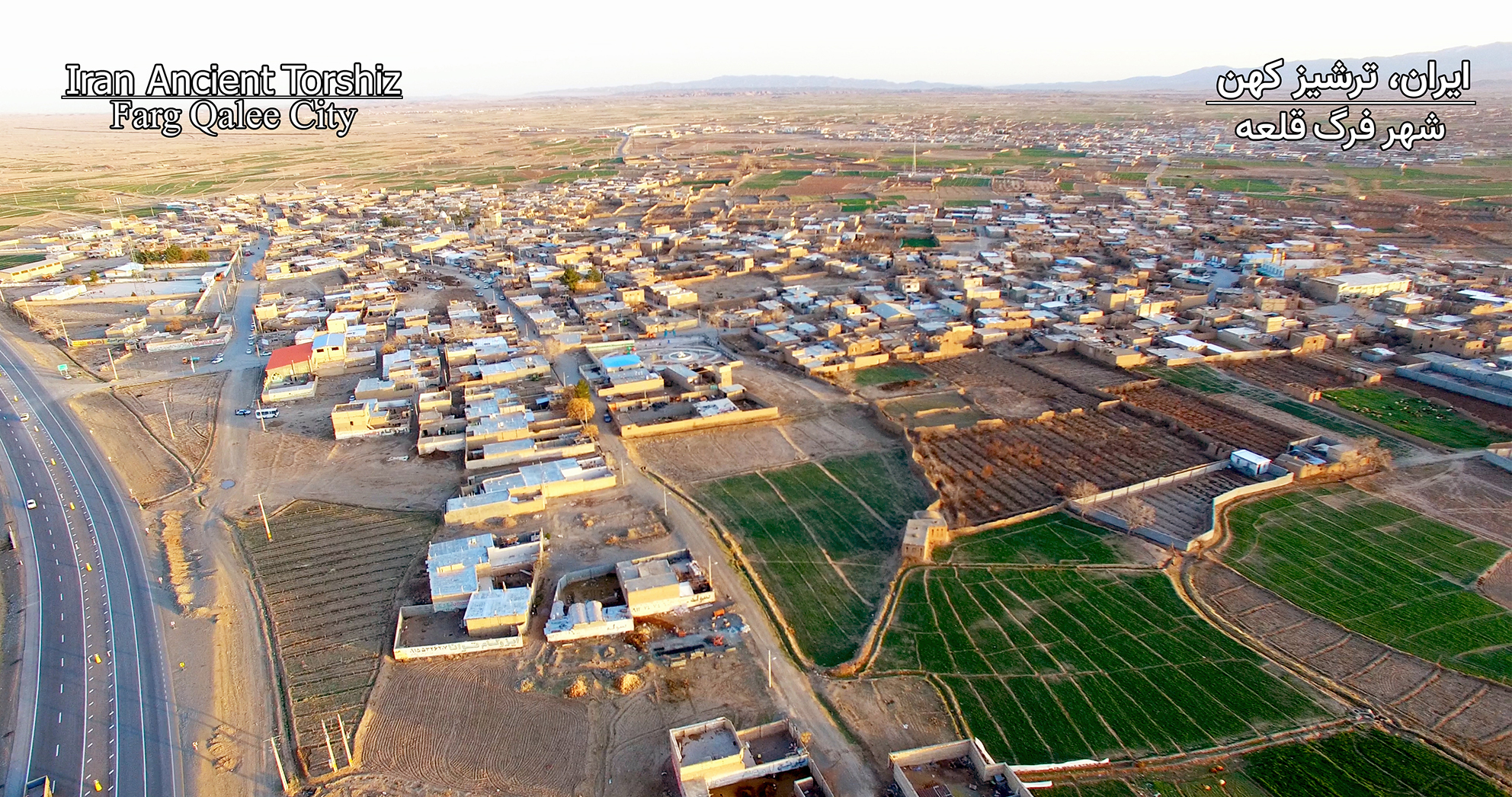
- The city of Farg Qaleh

- Location within Iran
- Coordinates: 35°13′19″N 58°33′25″E
- Country: Iran
- Province: Razavi Khorasan
- County: Kashmar
- District: Farah Dasht
- Established: 2022
- Time zone: UTC+3:30 (IRST)

Farg Qaleh (Persian: فرگ قلعه) (Note: Also known as Farg and Fark Qaleh) is a city in, and the capital of, Farah Dasht District in Kashmar County, Razavi Khorasan province, Iran.

== History ==
In 2019, several villages were separated from the Central District in the formation of Farah Dasht District. The villages of Farahabad (Note: Also known as Qaleh-ye Bala) and Farg (Note: Also known as Qaleh-ye Pain) were transferred to Qaleh-ye Bala Rural District created in the new district. In 2021, the two villages were merged to form the new village of Farg Qaleh, which was converted to a city the following year.
