= Bala Velayat Rural District (Kashmar County) =

Rural district in Razavi Khorasan province, Iran

Bala Velayat Rural District Persian: دهستان بالا ولايت
- Rural District
- Location within Iran
- Coordinates: 35°08′N 58°33′E
- Country: Iran
- Province: Razavi Khorasan
- County: Kashmar
- District: Central
- Established: 1987
- Capital: Quzhd

Population (2016)
  - Total: 28,610
- Time zone: UTC+3:30 (IRST)

Bala Velayat Rural District (Persian: دهستان بالا ولايت) is in the Central District of Kashmar County, Razavi Khorasan province, Iran. Its capital is the village of Quzhd. The previous capital of the rural district was the village of Farahabad, (Note: Also known as Qaleh-ye Bala) now a neighborhood in the city of Farg Qaleh.

== Demographics ==
=== Population ===
At the time of the 2006 National Census, the rural district's population was 26,581 in 7,052 households. There were 28,188 inhabitants in 8,465 households at the following census of 2011. The 2016 census measured the population of the rural district as 28,610 in 8,932 households. The most populous of its 57 villages was Quzhd, with 4,650 people.

=== Other villages in the rural district ===
- Eshaqabad
- Fadafen
- Forutqeh
- Gandabar
- Kalateh-ye Nay
- Talabad
- Torbeqan
