= Farah Dasht District =

District in Razavi Khorasan province, Iran

Farah Dasht District Persian: بخش فرح‌دشت
- District
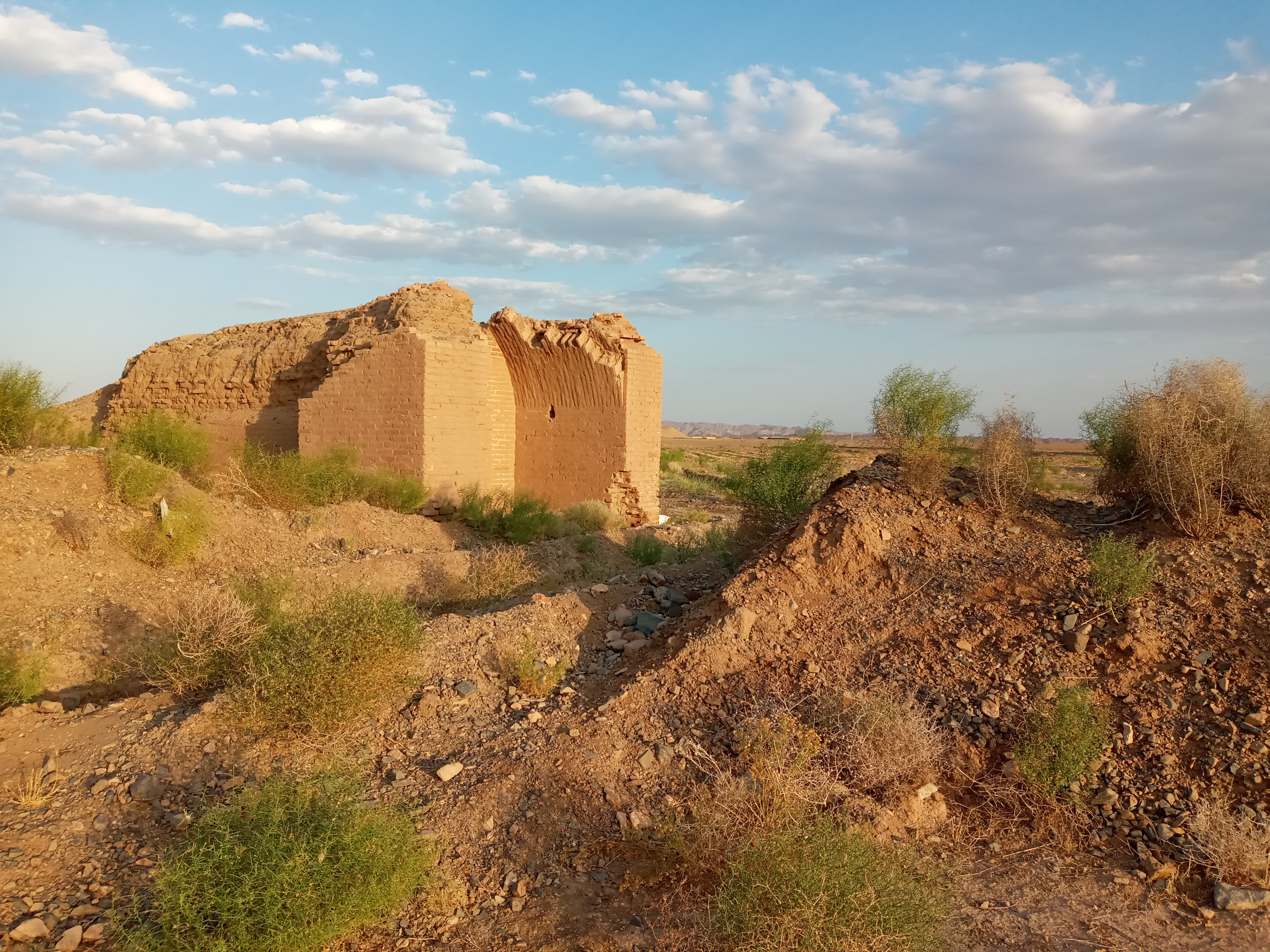
- Watermill in the village of Jordavi

- Location within Iran
- Coordinates: 35°16′N 58°39′E
- Country: Iran
- Province: Razavi Khorasan
- County: Kashmar
- Established: 2019
- Capital: Farg Qaleh
- Time zone: UTC+3:30 (IRST)

Farah Dasht District (Persian: بخش فرح‌دشت) is in Kashmar County, Razavi Khorasan province, Iran. Its capital is the city of Farg Qaleh.

== History ==
The district was formed in 2019. Two villages were merged to form the new village of Farg Qaleh in 2021, which was converted to a city in 2022.

== Demographics ==
=== Administrative divisions ===
Farah Dasht District
Administrative Divisions
Qaleh-ye Bala RD
Rezqabad RD
Farg Qaleh (city) (Note: Merger of two villages; became a city after the 2016 census)
RD = Rural District
