= Kashmar County =

County in Razavi Khorasan province, Iran

Kashmar County شهرستان کاشمر
- County
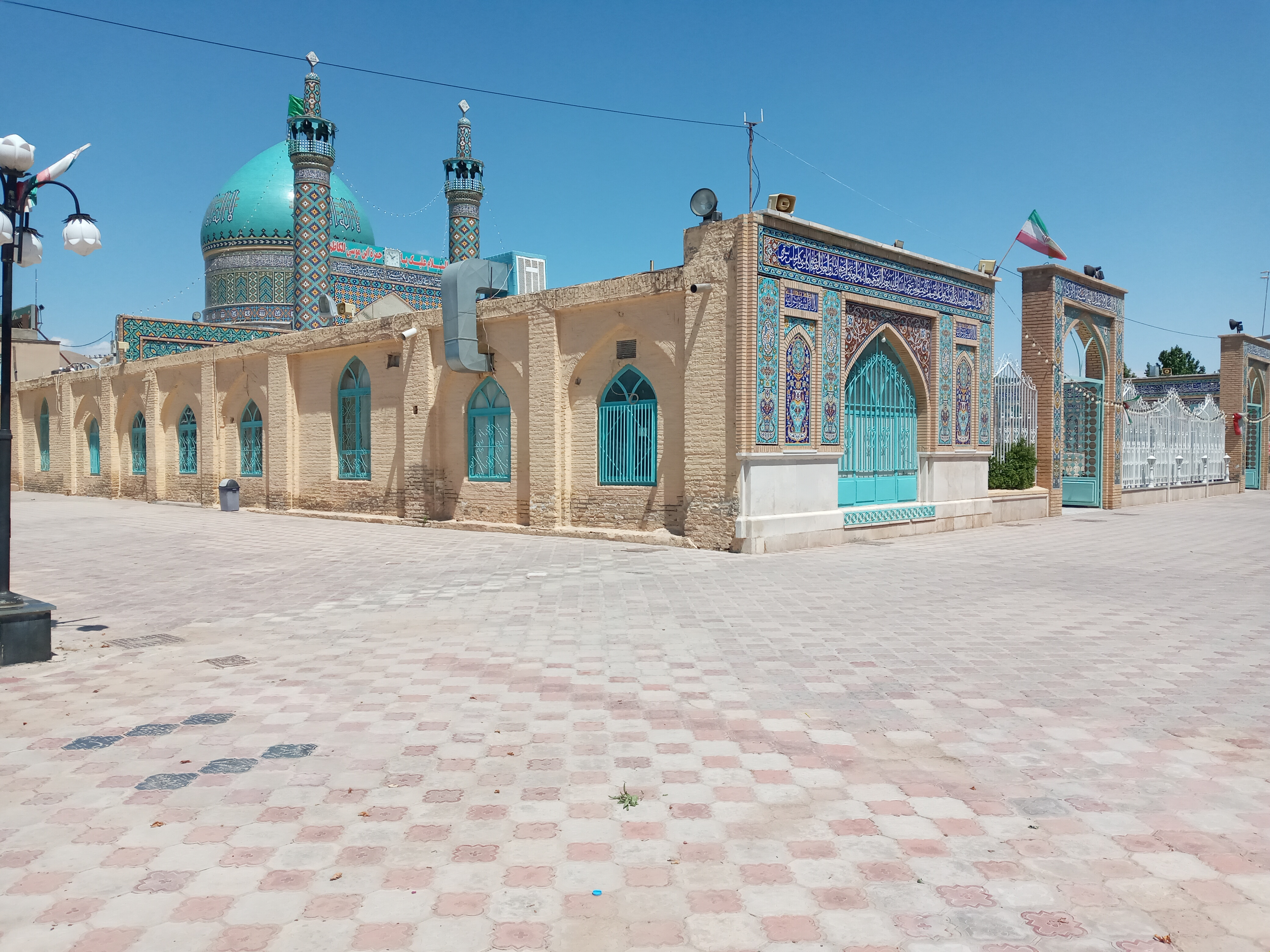
- Emamzadeh Hamzah

- Location of Kashmar County in Razavi Khorasan province (center left, yellow)

- Location of Razavi Khorasan province in Iran
- Coordinates: 35°12′N 58°34′E
- Country: Iran
- Province: Razavi Khorasan
- Capital: Kashmar
- Districts: Central, Farah Dasht

Area
  - Total: 1,152 km^{2} (445 sq mi)

Population (2016)
  - Total: 168,664
  - Density: 146.4/km^{2} (379.2/sq mi)
- Time zone: UTC+3:30 (IRST)

Kashmar County (Note: Persian: شهرستان کاشمر, romanized: Shahrestân-e Kâshmar) is in Razavi Khorasan province of Iran. Its capital is the city of Kashmar.

== History ==
In 2019, Farah Dasht District was formed and divided into the new Qaleh-ye Bala and Rezqabad Rural Districts. At the same time, Kuhsorkh District was separated from the county in the establishment of Kuhsorkh County. Two villages were merged to form the new village of Farg Qaleh in 2021, which was converted to a city in 2022.

== Demographics ==
=== Population ===
At the time of the 2006 National Census, the county's population was 146,536 in 39,554 households. The following census in 2011 counted 157,149 people in 46,726 households. The 2016 census measured the population of the county as 168,664 in 52,778 households.

=== Administrative divisions ===
Kashmar County's population history and administrative structure over three consecutive censuses are shown in the following table.

Kashmar County Population
Administrative Divisions	2006	2011	2016
Central District	119,507	130,891	143,650
Bala Velayat RD	26,581	28,188	28,610
Pain Velayat RD	11,399	12,503	12,758
Kashmar (city)	81,527	90,200	102,282
Farah Dasht District (Note: Established after the 2016 census)			
Qaleh-ye Bala RD			
Rezqabad RD			
Farg Qaleh (city) (Note: Merger of two villages; became a city after the 2016 census)			
Kuhsorkh District (Note: Transferred to Kuhsorkh County after the 2016 census)	27,029	26,258	25,014
Barkuh RD	11,963	11,692	11,357
Barrud RD	4,684	3,947	3,586
Takab RD	5,772	4,857	4,384
Rivash (city)	4,610	5,762	5,687
Total	146,536	157,149	168,664
RD = Rural District

== See also ==
Media related to Kashmar County at Wikimedia Commons
