= Tavalli =

Village in Razavi Khorasan province, Iran

Tavalli Persian: تولا
- Village
- Location within Iran
- Coordinates: 35°29′54″N 58°29′40″E
- Country: Iran
- Province: Razavi Khorasan
- County: Kuhsorkh
- District: Central
- Rural District: Kuh Sefid

Population (2016)
  - Total: 965
- Time zone: UTC+3:30 (IRST)

Tavalli (Persian: تولا) (Note: Also romanized as Tavallī; also known as Tavallā, Tavalleh, and Tawalla) is a village in, and the capital of, Kuh Sefid Rural District in the Central District of Kuhsorkh County, Razavi Khorasan province, Iran.

== Demographics ==
=== Population ===
At the time of the 2006 National Census, the village's population was 1,181 in 328 households, when it was in Barkuh Rural District of the former Kuhsorkh District in Kashmar County. The following census in 2011 counted 1,055 people in 338 households. The 2016 census measured the population of the village as 965 people in 334 households.

In 2019, the district was separated from the county in the establishment of Kuhsorkh County, and the rural district was transferred to the new Central District. Tavalli was transferred to Kuh Sefid Rural District created in the same district.
