= Chalpu, Kuhsorkh =

Village in Razavi Khorasan province, Iran

Chalpu Persian: چلپو
- Village
- Location within Iran
- Coordinates: 35°36′49″N 58°32′31″E
- Country: Iran
- Province: Razavi Khorasan
- County: Kuhsorkh
- District: Central
- Rural District: Kuh Sefid

Population (2016)
  - Total: 489
- Time zone: UTC+3:30 (IRST)

Chalpu (Persian: چلپو) (Note: Also romanized as Chalpū) is a village in Kuh Sefid Rural District of the Central District in Kuhsorkh County, Razavi Khorasan province, Iran.

== Demographics ==
=== Population ===
At the time of the 2006 National Census, the village's population was 486 in 112 households, when it was in Barkuh Rural District of the former Kuhsorkh District in Kashmar County. The following census in 2011 counted 512 people in 138 households. The 2016 census measured the population of the village as 489 people in 144 households.

In 2019, the district was separated from the county in the establishment of Kuhsorkh County, and the rural district was transferred to the new Central District. Chalpu was transferred to Kuh Sefid Rural District created in the same district.
