= Bakhtiar, Kuhsorkh =

Village in Razavi Khorasan province, Iran

Bakhtiar Persian: بختيار
- Village
- Location within Iran
- Coordinates: 35°29′51″N 58°28′38″E
- Country: Iran
- Province: Razavi Khorasan
- County: Kuhsorkh
- District: Central
- Rural District: Kuh Sefid

Population (2016)
  - Total: 238
- Time zone: UTC+3:30 (IRST)

Bakhtiar (Persian: بختيار) (Note: Also romanized as Bakhtīār) is a village in Kuh Sefid Rural District of the Central District in Kuhsorkh County, Razavi Khorasan province, Iran.

== Demographics ==
=== Population ===
At the time of the 2006 National Census, the village's population was 294 in 79 households, when it was in Barkuh Rural District of the former Kuhsorkh District in Kashmar County. The following census in 2011 counted 320 people in 89 households. The 2016 census measured the population of the village as 238 people in 70 households.

In 2019, the district was separated from the county in the establishment of Kuhsorkh County, and the rural district was transferred to the new Central District. Bakhtiar was transferred to Kuh Sefid Rural District created in the same district.
