= Maki, Kuhsorkh =

Village in Razavi Khorasan province, Iran

Maki Persian: مکی
- Village
- Location within Iran
- Coordinates: 35°27′53″N 58°29′07″E
- Country: Iran
- Province: Razavi Khorasan
- County: Kuhsorkh
- District: Central
- Rural District: Kuh Sefid

Population (2016)
  - Total: 1,469
- Time zone: UTC+3:30 (IRST)

Maki (Persian: مکی) (Note: Also romanized as Makkī) is a village in Kuh Sefid Rural District of the Central District in Kuhsorkh County, Razavi Khorasan province, Iran.

== Demographics ==
=== Population ===
At the time of the 2006 National Census, the village's population was 1,474 in 375 households, when it was in Barkuh Rural District of the former Kuhsorkh District in Kashmar County. The following census in 2011 counted 1,489 people in 451 households. The 2016 census measured the population of the village as 1,469 people in 476 households.

In 2019, the district was separated from the county in the establishment of Kuhsorkh County, and the rural district was transferred to the new Central District. Maki was transferred to Kuh Sefid Rural District created in the same district.
