= Aliabad, Kuhsorkh =

Village in Razavi Khorasan province, Iran

Aliabad Persian: علی‌آباد
- Village
- Location within Iran
- Coordinates: 35°29′54″N 58°28′54″E
- Country: Iran
- Province: Razavi Khorasan
- County: Kuhsorkh
- District: Central
- Rural District: Kuh Sefid

Population (2016)
  - Total: 786
- Time zone: UTC+3:30 (IRST)

Aliabad (Persian: علی‌آباد) (Note: Also romanized as ‘Alīābād; also known as ‘Alīābād-e Bakhtīār) is a village in Kuh Sefid Rural District of the Central District in Kuhsorkh County, Razavi Khorasan province, Iran.

== Demographics ==
=== Population ===
At the time of the 2006 National Census, the village's population was 979 in 249 households, when it was in Barkuh Rural District of the former Kuhsorkh District in Kashmar County. The following census in 2011 counted 1,005 people in 295 households. The 2016 census measured the population of the village as 786 people in 263 households.

In 2019, the district was separated from the county in the establishment of Kuhsorkh County, and the rural district was transferred to the new Central District. Aliabad was transferred to Kuh Sefid Rural District created in the same district.
