= Kusheh, Kuhsorkh =

Village in Razavi Khorasan province, Iran

Kusheh Persian: كوشه
- Village
- Location within Iran
- Coordinates: 35°27′58″N 58°30′10″E
- Country: Iran
- Province: Razavi Khorasan
- County: Kuhsorkh
- District: Central
- Rural District: Kuh Sefid

Population (2016)
  - Total: 1,251
- Time zone: UTC+3:30 (IRST)

Kusheh (Persian: كوشه) (Note: Also romanized as Kūsheh) is a village in Kuh Sefid Rural District of the Central District in Kuhsorkh County, Razavi Khorasan province, Iran.

== Demographics ==
=== Population ===
At the time of the 2006 National Census, the village's population was 1,113 in 278 households, when it was in Barkuh Rural District of the former Kuhsorkh District in Kashmar County. The following census in 2011 counted 1,241 people in 356 households. The 2016 census measured the population of the village as 1,251 people in 370 households.

In 2019, the district was separated from the county in the establishment of Kuhsorkh County, and the rural district was transferred to the new Central District. Kusheh was transferred to Kuh Sefid Rural District created in the same district.
