= Khezr Beyg =

Village in Razavi Khorasan province, Iran

Khezr Beyg Persian: خضربيگ
- Village
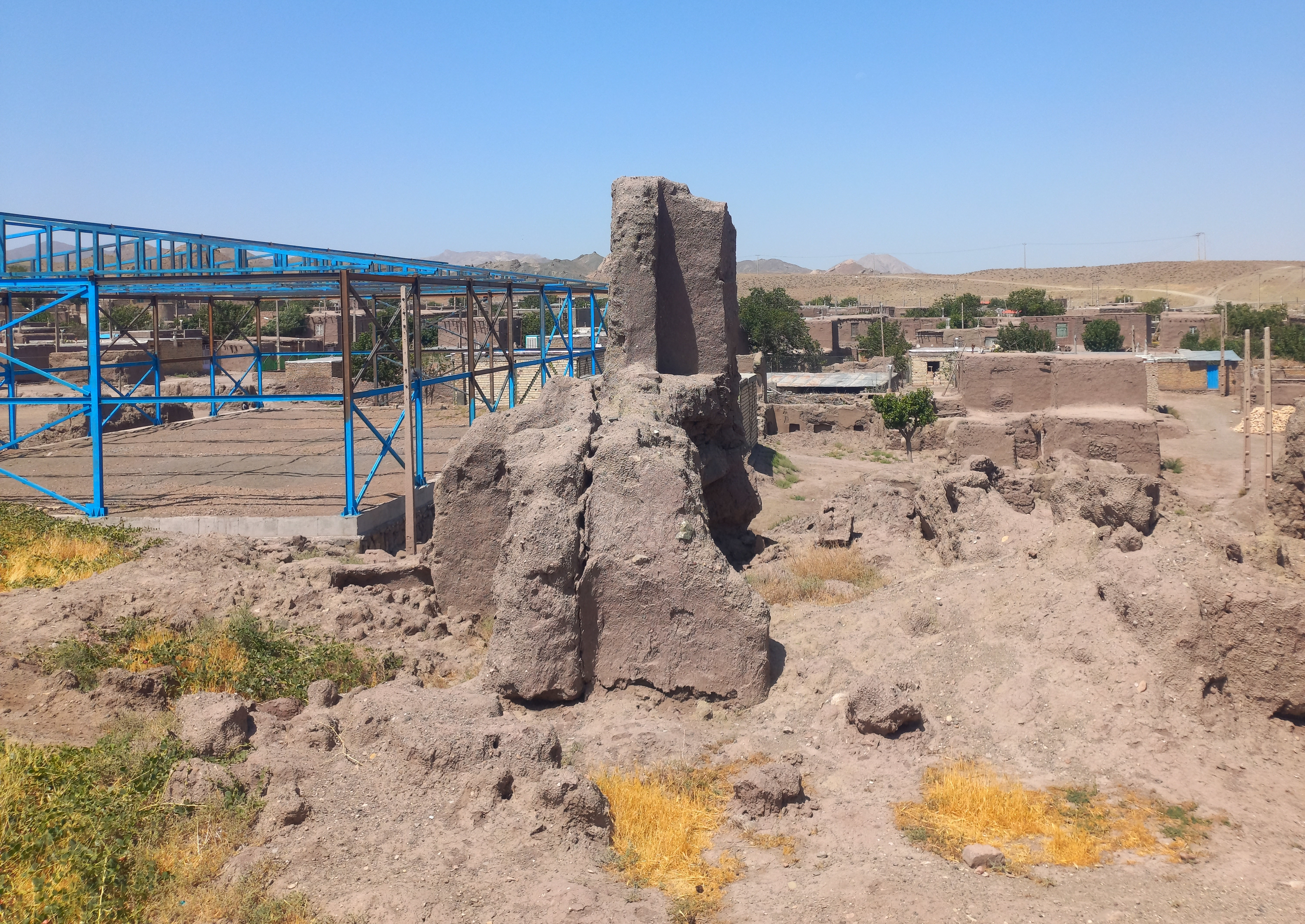
- Khezr Beyg Castle

- Location within Iran
- Coordinates: 35°35′17″N 58°21′50″E
- Country: Iran
- Province: Razavi Khorasan
- County: Kuhsorkh
- District: Barrud
- Rural District: Takab

Population (2016)
  - Total: 965
- Time zone: UTC+3:30 (IRST)

Khezr Beyg (Persian: خضربيگ) (Note: Also romanized as Khazar Beyg and Kheẕr Beyg) is a village in Takab Rural District of Barrud District in Kuhsorkh County, Razavi Khorasan province, Iran.

== Demographics ==
=== Population ===
At the time of the 2006 National Census, the village's population was 1,158 in 289 households, when it was in the former Kuhsorkh District of Kashmar County. The following census in 2011 counted 1,044 people in 331 households. The 2016 census measured the population of the village as 965 people in 298 households.

In 2019, the district was separated from the county in the establishment of Kuhsorkh County, and the rural district was transferred to the new Barrud District.
