= Kusheh Nama =

Village in Razavi Khorasan province, Iran

Kusheh Nama Persian: كوشه نما
- Village
- Location within Iran
- Coordinates: 35°26′22″N 58°32′41″E
- Country: Iran
- Province: Razavi Khorasan
- County: Kuhsorkh
- District: Central
- Rural District: Barkuh

Population (2016)
  - Total: 480
- Time zone: UTC+3:30 (IRST)

Kusheh Nama (Persian: كوشه نما) (Note: Also romanized as Kūsheh Namā) is a village in Barkuh Rural District of the Central District in Kuhsorkh County, Razavi Khorasan province, Iran.

== Demographics ==
=== Population ===
At the time of the 2006 National Census, the village's population was 378 in 112 households, when it was in the former Kuhsorkh District of Kashmar County. The following census in 2011 counted 420 people in 127 households. The 2016 census measured the population of the village as 480 people in 140 households.

In 2019, the district was separated from the county in the establishment of Kuhsorkh County, and the rural district was transferred to the new Central District.
