= Deh-e Mian, Kuhsorkh =

Village in Razavi Khorasan province, Iran

Deh-e Mian Persian: ده ميان
- Village
- Location within Iran
- Coordinates: 35°41′54″N 58°16′14″E
- Country: Iran
- Province: Razavi Khorasan
- County: Kuhsorkh
- District: Barrud
- Rural District: Takab

Population (2016)
  - Total: 600
- Time zone: UTC+3:30 (IRST)

Deh-e Mian (Persian: ده ميان) (Note: Also romanized as Deh Meyān, Deh Mīyān, and Deh-e Mīān; also known as Deh Mū’ī) is a village in Takab Rural District of Barrud District in Kuhsorkh County, Razavi Khorasan province, Iran.

== Demographics ==
=== Population ===
At the time of the 2006 National Census, the village's population was 843 in 225 households, when it was in the former Kuhsorkh District of Kashmar County. The following census in 2011 counted 770 people in 240 households. The 2016 census measured the population of the village as 600 people in 187 households.

In 2019, the district was separated from the county in the establishment of Kuhsorkh County, and the rural district was transferred to the new Barrud District.
