= Qaracheh =

Village in Razavi Khorasan province, Iran

Qaracheh Persian: قراچه
- Village
- Location within Iran
- Coordinates: 35°29′06″N 58°23′01″E
- Country: Iran
- Province: Razavi Khorasan
- County: Kuhsorkh
- District: Barrud
- Rural District: Barrud

Population (2016)
  - Total: 453
- Time zone: UTC+3:30 (IRST)

Qaracheh (Persian: قراچه) (Note: Also romanized as Qarācheh) is a village in Barrud Rural District of Barrud District in Kuhsorkh County, Razavi Khorasan province, Iran.

== Demographics ==
=== Population ===
At the time of the 2006 National Census, the village's population was 590 in 180 households, when it was in the former Kuhsorkh District of Kashmar County. The following census in 2011 counted 462 people in 156 households. The 2016 census measured the population of the village as 453 people in 162 households.

In 2019, the district was separated from the county in the establishment of Kuhsorkh County, and the rural district was transferred to the new Barrud District.
