= Avandar =

Village in Razavi Khorasan province, Iran

Avandar Persian: اوندر
- Village
- Location within Iran
- Coordinates: 35°36′50″N 58°20′04″E
- Country: Iran
- Province: Razavi Khorasan
- County: Kuhsorkh
- District: Barrud
- Rural District: Takab

Population (2016)
  - Total: 996
- Time zone: UTC+3:30 (IRST)

Avandar (Persian: اوندر) is a village in, and the capital of, Takab Rural District in Barrud District of Kuhsorkh County, Razavi Khorasan province, Iran.

== Demographics ==
=== Population ===
At the time of the 2006 National Census, the village's population was 1,572 in 393 households, when it was in the former Kuhsorkh District of Kashmar County. The following census in 2011 counted 1,274 people in 370 households. The 2016 census measured the population of the village as 996 people in 326 households, the most populous in its rural district.

In 2019, the district was separated from the county in the establishment of Kuhsorkh County, and the rural district was transferred to the new Barrud District.
