= Mushak, Iran =

Village in Razavi Khorasan province, Iran

Mushak Persian: موشک
- Village
- Location within Iran
- Coordinates: 35°30′24″N 58°32′32″E
- Country: Iran
- Province: Razavi Khorasan
- County: Kuhsorkh
- District: Central
- Rural District: Barkuh

Population (2016)
  - Total: 903
- Time zone: UTC+3:30 (IRST)

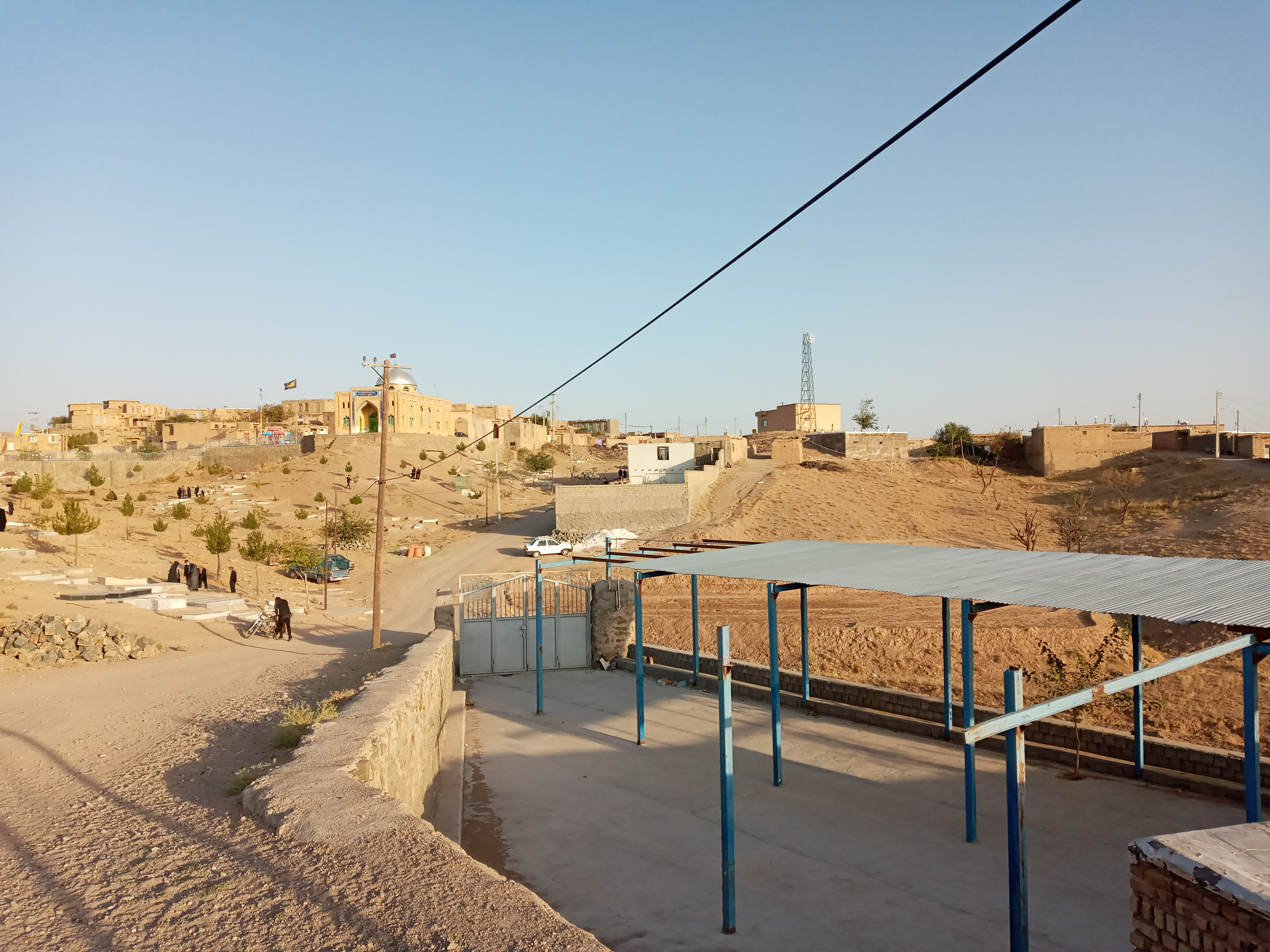
Mushak, 2021

Mushak (Persian: موشک) (Note: Also romanized as Mūshak) is a village in Barkuh Rural District of the Central District in Kuhsorkh County, Razavi Khorasan province, Iran.

== Demographics ==
=== Population ===
At the time of the 2006 National Census, the village's population was 1,171 in 331 households, when it was in the former Kuhsorkh District of Kashmar County. The following census in 2011 counted 1,063 people in 331 households. The 2016 census measured the population of the village as 903 people in 301 households.

In 2019, the district was separated from the county in the establishment of Kuhsorkh County, and the rural district was transferred to the new Central District.
