= Khezrabad, Kuhsorkh =

Village in Razavi Khorasan province, Iran

Khezrabad Persian: خضراباد
- Village
- Location within Iran
- Coordinates: 35°38′34″N 58°18′17″E
- Country: Iran
- Province: Razavi Khorasan
- County: Kuhsorkh
- District: Barrud
- Rural District: Takab

Population (2016)
  - Total: 223
- Time zone: UTC+3:30 (IRST)

Khezrabad (Persian: خضراباد) (Note: Also romanized as Kheẕrābād and Khezrābād; also known as Khizrābād and Kirzrābād) is a village in Takab Rural District of Barrud District in Kuhsorkh County, Razavi Khorasan province, Iran.

== Demographics ==
=== Population ===
At the time of the 2006 National Census, the village's population was 274 in 69 households, when it was in the former Kuhsorkh District of Kashmar County. The following census in 2011 counted 227 people in 66 households. The 2016 census measured the population of the village as 223 people in 70 households.

In 2019, the district was separated from the county in the establishment of Kuhsorkh County, and the rural district was transferred to the new Barrud District.
