= Tajrud, Kuhsorkh =

Village in Razavi Khorasan province, Iran

Tajrud Persian: تجرود
- Village
- Location within Iran
- Coordinates: 35°30′19″N 58°18′52″E
- Country: Iran
- Province: Razavi Khorasan
- County: Kuhsorkh
- District: Barrud
- Rural District: Barrud

Population (2016)
  - Total: 141
- Time zone: UTC+3:30 (IRST)

Tajrud (Persian: تجرود) (Note: Also romanized as Tajrūd) is a village in Barrud Rural District of Barrud District in Kuhsorkh County, Razavi Khorasan province, Iran.

== Demographics ==
=== Population ===
At the time of the 2006 National Census, the village's population was 216 in 62 households, when it was in the former Kuhsorkh District of Kashmar County. The following census in 2011 counted 165 people in 58 households. The 2016 census measured the population of the village as 141 people in 48 households.

In 2019, the district was separated from the county in the establishment of Kuhsorkh County, and the rural district was transferred to the new Barrud District.
