= Ivar, Kuhsorkh =

Village in Razavi Khorasan province, Iran

Ivar Persian: ايور
- Village
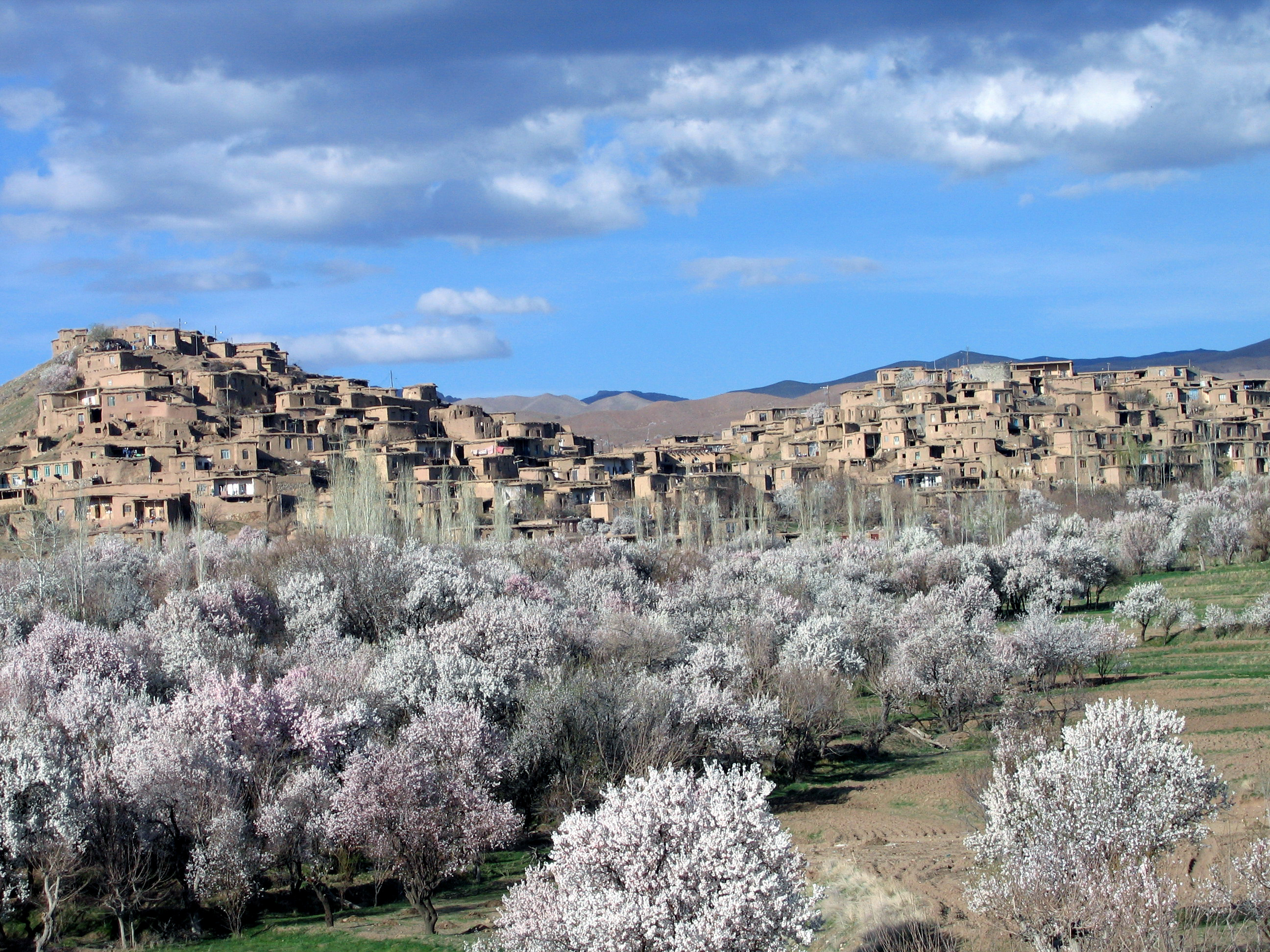
- The village of Ivar

- Location within Iran
- Coordinates: 35°28′45″N 58°35′00″E
- Country: Iran
- Province: Razavi Khorasan
- County: Kuhsorkh
- District: Central
- Rural District: Barkuh

Population (2016)
  - Total: 2,753
- Time zone: UTC+3:30 (IRST)

Ivar (Persian: ايور) (Note: Also romanized as Avar, Ewar, and Īvar) is a village in, and the capital of, Barkuh Rural District in the Central District of Kuhsorkh County, Razavi Khorasan province, Iran. The previous capital of the rural district was the village of Rivash, now a city.

== Demographics ==
=== Population ===
At the time of the 2006 National Census, the village's population was 2,627 in 668 households, when it was in the former Kuhsorkh District of Kashmar County. The following census in 2011 counted 2,655 people in 812 households. The 2016 census measured the population of the village as 2,753 people in 836 households. It was the most populous village in its rural district.

In 2019, the district was separated from the county in the establishment of Kuhsorkh County, and the rural district was transferred to the new Central District.
