= Kalateh-ye Teymur =

Village in Razavi Khorasan province, Iran

Kalateh-ye Teymur Persian: كلاته تيمور
- Village
- Location within Iran
- Coordinates: 35°23′58″N 58°21′36″E
- Country: Iran
- Province: Razavi Khorasan
- County: Kuhsorkh
- District: Barrud
- Rural District: Barrud

Population (2016)
  - Total: 116
- Time zone: UTC+3:30 (IRST)

Kalateh-ye Teymur (Persian: كلاته تيمور) (Note: Also romanized as Kalāteh-ye Teymūr) is a village in Barrud Rural District of Barrud District in Kuhsorkh County, Razavi Khorasan province, Iran.

== Demographics ==
=== Population ===
At the time of the 2006 National Census, the village's population was 153 in 38 households, when it was in the former Kuhsorkh District of Kashmar County. The following census in 2011 counted 141 people in 40 households. The 2016 census measured the population of the village as 116 people in 34 households.

In 2019, the district was separated from the county in the establishment of Kuhsorkh County, and the rural district was transferred to the new Barrud District.
