= Tanurjeh =

Village in Razavi Khorasan province, Iran

Tanurjeh Persian: تنورجه
- Village
- Location within Iran
- Coordinates: 35°23′53″N 58°37′36″E
- Country: Iran
- Province: Razavi Khorasan
- County: Kuhsorkh
- District: Central
- Rural District: Barkuh

Population (2016)
  - Total: 968
- Time zone: UTC+3:30 (IRST)

Tanurjeh (Persian: تنورجه) (Note: Also romanized as Tanoorjeh, Tanūrjeh, and Tonvarjeh; also known as Tanūrah, Tanūrcheh, and Tonvareh) is a village in Barkuh Rural District of the Central District in Kuhsorkh County, Razavi Khorasan province, Iran.

== Demographics ==
=== Population ===
At the time of the 2006 National Census, the village's population was 895 in 238 households, when it was in the former Kuhsorkh District of Kashmar County. The following census in 2011 counted 768 people in 234 households. The 2016 census measured the population of the village as 968 people in 301 households.

In 2019, the district was separated from the county in the establishment of Kuhsorkh County, and the rural district was transferred to the new Central District.
