= Tavandar =

Village in Razavi Khorasan province, Iran

Tavandar Persian: توندر
- Village
- Location within Iran
- Coordinates: 35°34′06″N 58°16′45″E
- Country: Iran
- Province: Razavi Khorasan
- County: Kuhsorkh
- District: Barrud
- Rural District: Takab

Population (2016)
  - Total: 846
- Time zone: UTC+3:30 (IRST)

Tavandar (Persian: توندر) (Note: Also romanized as Tawandar and Toondar) is a village in Takab Rural District of Barrud District in Kuhsorkh County, Razavi Khorasan province, Iran.

== Demographics ==
=== Population ===
At the time of the 2006 National Census, the village's population was 867 in 209 households, when it was in the former Kuhsorkh District of Kashmar County. The following census in 2011 counted 771 people in 212 households. The 2016 census measured the population of the village as 846 people in 236 households.

In 2019, the district was separated from the county in the establishment of Kuhsorkh County, and the rural district was transferred to the new Barrud District.
