= Kalateh-ye Pain Darreh =

Village in Razavi Khorasan province, Iran

Kalateh-ye Pain Darreh Persian: كلاته پايين دره
- Village
- Location within Iran
- Coordinates: 35°28′26″N 58°20′00″E
- Country: Iran
- Province: Razavi Khorasan
- County: Kuhsorkh
- District: Barrud
- Rural District: Barrud

Population (2016)
  - Total: 256
- Time zone: UTC+3:30 (IRST)

Kalateh-ye Pain Darreh (Persian: كلاته پايين دره) (Note: Also romanized as Kalāteh-ye Pā’īn Darreh; also known as Kalāteh-ye Pā’īn Deh) is a village in Barrud Rural District of Barrud District in Kuhsorkh County, Razavi Khorasan province, Iran.

== Demographics ==
=== Population ===
At the time of the 2006 National Census, the village's population was 281 in 85 households, when it was in the former Kuhsorkh District of Kashmar County. The following census in 2011 counted 259 people in 91 households. The 2016 census measured the population of the village as 256 people in 83 households.

In 2019, the district was separated from the county in the establishment of Kuhsorkh County, and the rural district was transferred to the new Barrud District.
