= Senjedak, Kuhsorkh =

Village in Razavi Khorasan province, Iran

Senjedak Persian: سنجدك
- Village
- Location within Iran
- Coordinates: 35°35′53″N 58°10′20″E
- Country: Iran
- Province: Razavi Khorasan
- County: Kuhsorkh
- District: Barrud
- Rural District: Takab

Population (2016)
  - Total: 209
- Time zone: UTC+3:30 (IRST)

Senjedak (Persian: سنجدك) is a village in Takab Rural District of Barrud District in Kuhsorkh County, Razavi Khorasan province, Iran.

== Demographics ==
=== Population ===
At the time of the 2006 National Census, the village's population was 335 in 100 households, when it was in the former Kuhsorkh District of Kashmar County. The following census in 2011 counted 258 people in 84 households. The 2016 census measured the population of the village as 209 people in 63 households.

In 2019, the district was separated from the county in the establishment of Kuhsorkh County, and the rural district was transferred to the new Barrud District.
