= Kharu, Kuhsorkh =

Village in Razavi Khorasan province, Iran

Kharu Persian: خرو
- Village
- Location within Iran
- Coordinates: 35°30′39″N 58°15′35″E
- Country: Iran
- Province: Razavi Khorasan
- County: Kuhsorkh
- District: Barrud
- Rural District: Barrud

Population (2016)
  - Total: 119
- Time zone: UTC+3:30 (IRST)

Kharu (Persian: خرو) (Note: Also romanized as Kharū) is a village in Barrud Rural District of Barrud District in Kuhsorkh County, Razavi Khorasan province, Iran.

== Demographics ==
=== Population ===
At the time of the 2006 National Census, the village's population was 89 in 30 households, when it was in the former Kuhsorkh District of Kashmar County. The following census in 2011 counted 78 people in 29 households. The 2016 census measured the population of the village as 119 people in 41 households.

In 2019, the district was separated from the county in the establishment of Kuhsorkh County, and the rural district was transferred to the new Barrud District.
