= Daghi, Kuhsorkh =

Village in Razavi Khorasan province, Iran

Daghi Persian: داغي
- Village
- Location within Iran
- Coordinates: 35°38′13″N 58°11′41″E
- Country: Iran
- Province: Razavi Khorasan
- County: Kuhsorkh
- District: Barrud
- Rural District: Takab

Population (2016)
  - Total: 160
- Time zone: UTC+3:30 (IRST)

Daghi (Persian: داغي) (Note: Also romanized as Dāghī) is a village in Takab Rural District of Barrud District in Kuhsorkh County, Razavi Khorasan province, Iran.

== Demographics ==
=== Population ===
At the time of the 2006 National Census, the village's population was 215 in 63 households, when it was in the former Kuhsorkh District of Kashmar County. The following census in 2011 counted 172 people in 56 households. The 2016 census measured the population of the village as 160 people in 47 households.

In 2019, the district was separated from the county in the establishment of Kuhsorkh County, and the rural district was transferred to the new Barrud District.
