= Tarq, Kuhsorkh =

Village in Razavi Khorasan province, Iran

Tarq Persian: طرق
- Village
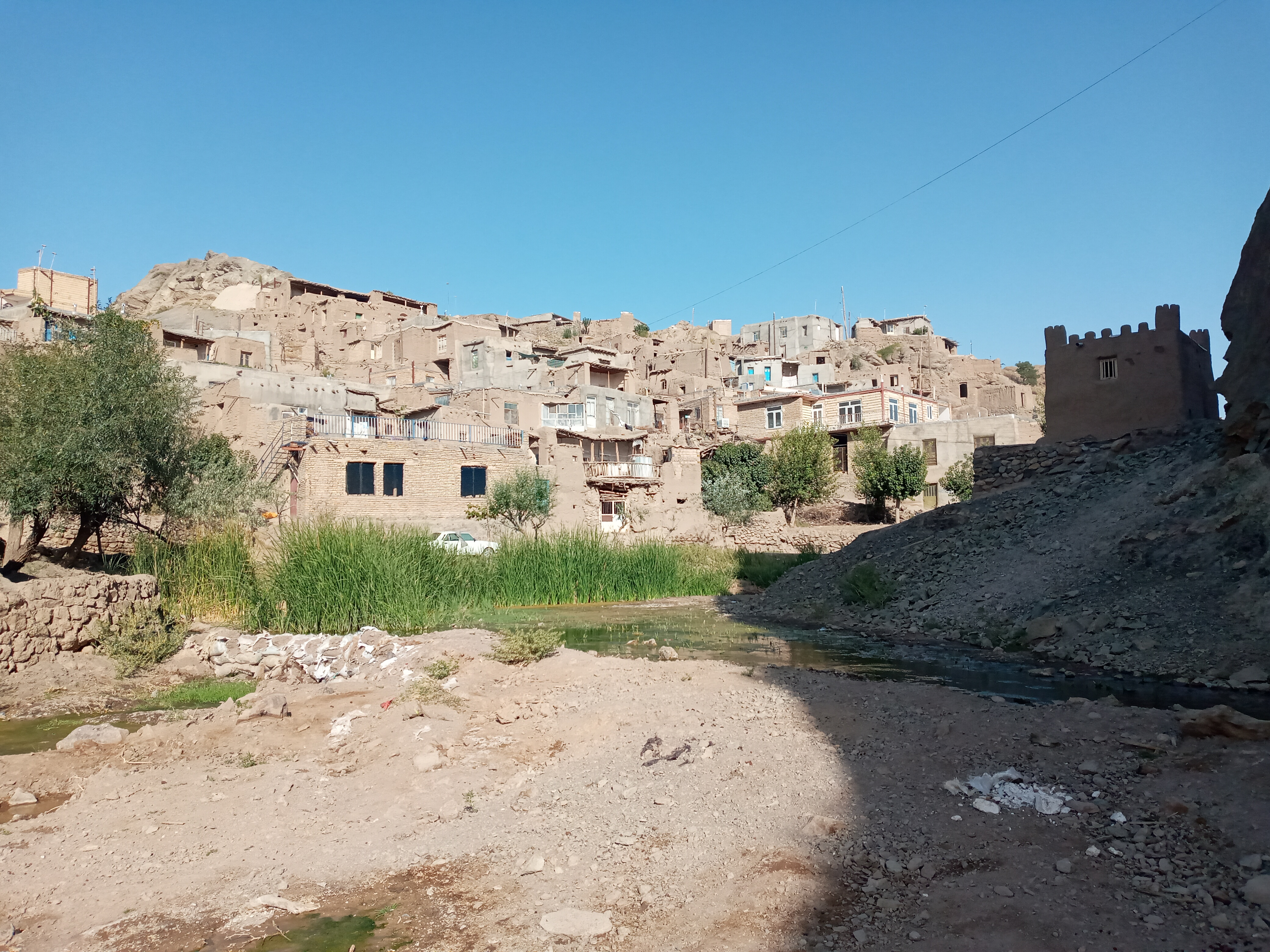
- The village of Tarq in 2021

- Location within Iran
- Coordinates: 35°29′00″N 58°24′51″E
- Country: Iran
- Province: Razavi Khorasan
- County: Kuhsorkh
- District: Barrud
- Rural District: Barrud

Population (2016)
  - Total: 1,507
- Time zone: UTC+3:30 (IRST)

Tarq (Persian: طرق) is a village in Barrud Rural District of Barrud District in Kuhsorkh County, Razavi Khorasan province, Iran, serving as capital of both the district and the rural district.

== Demographics ==
=== Population ===
At the time of the 2006 National Census, the village's population was 1,803 in 541 households, when it was in the former Kuhsorkh District of Kashmar County. The following census in 2011 counted 1,791 people in 568 households. The 2016 census measured the population of the village as 1,507 people in 572 households, the most populous in its rural district.

In 2019, the district was separated from the county in the establishment of Kuhsorkh County, and the rural district was transferred to the new Barrud District.

== Gallery ==
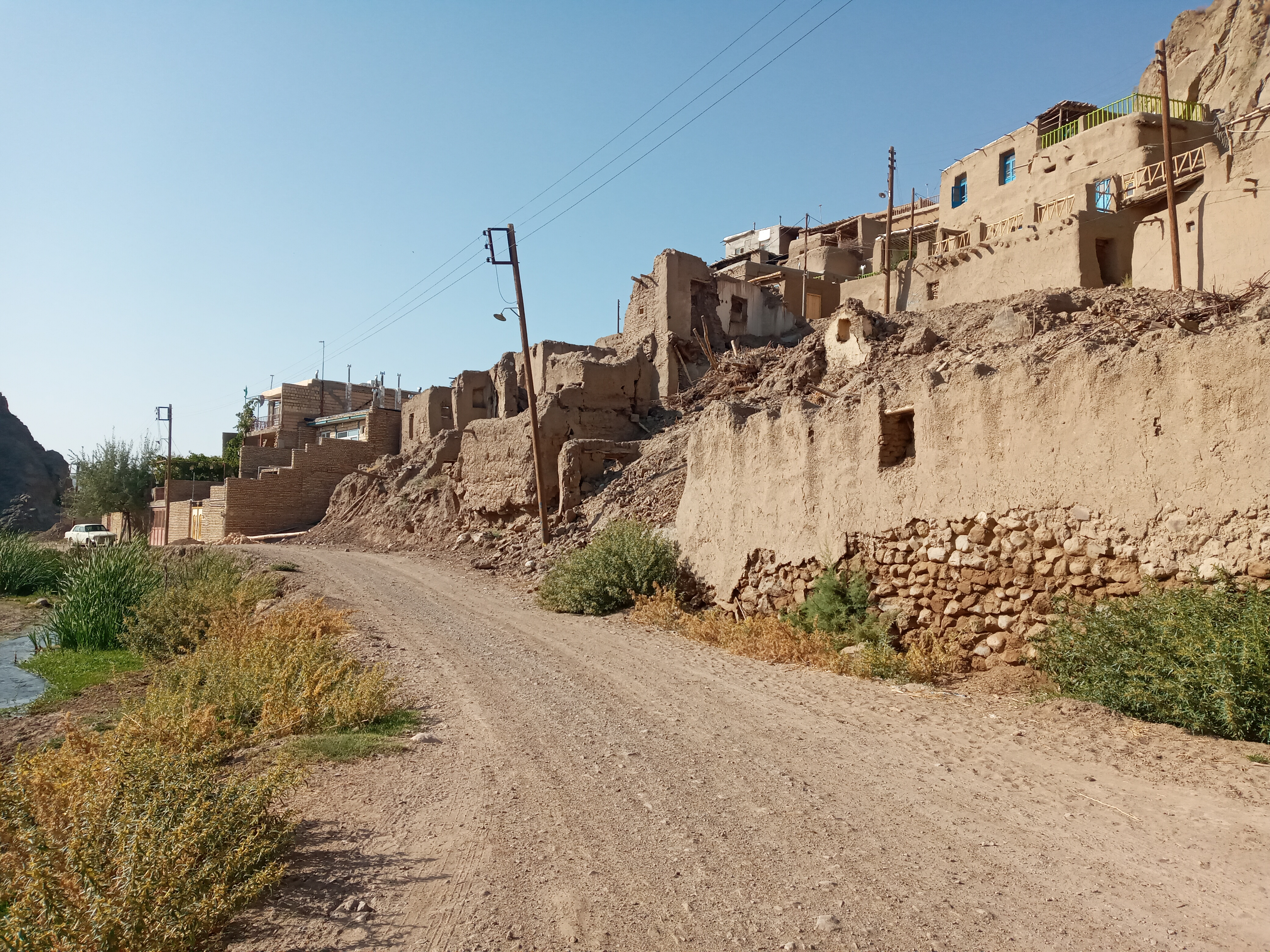
View of the village

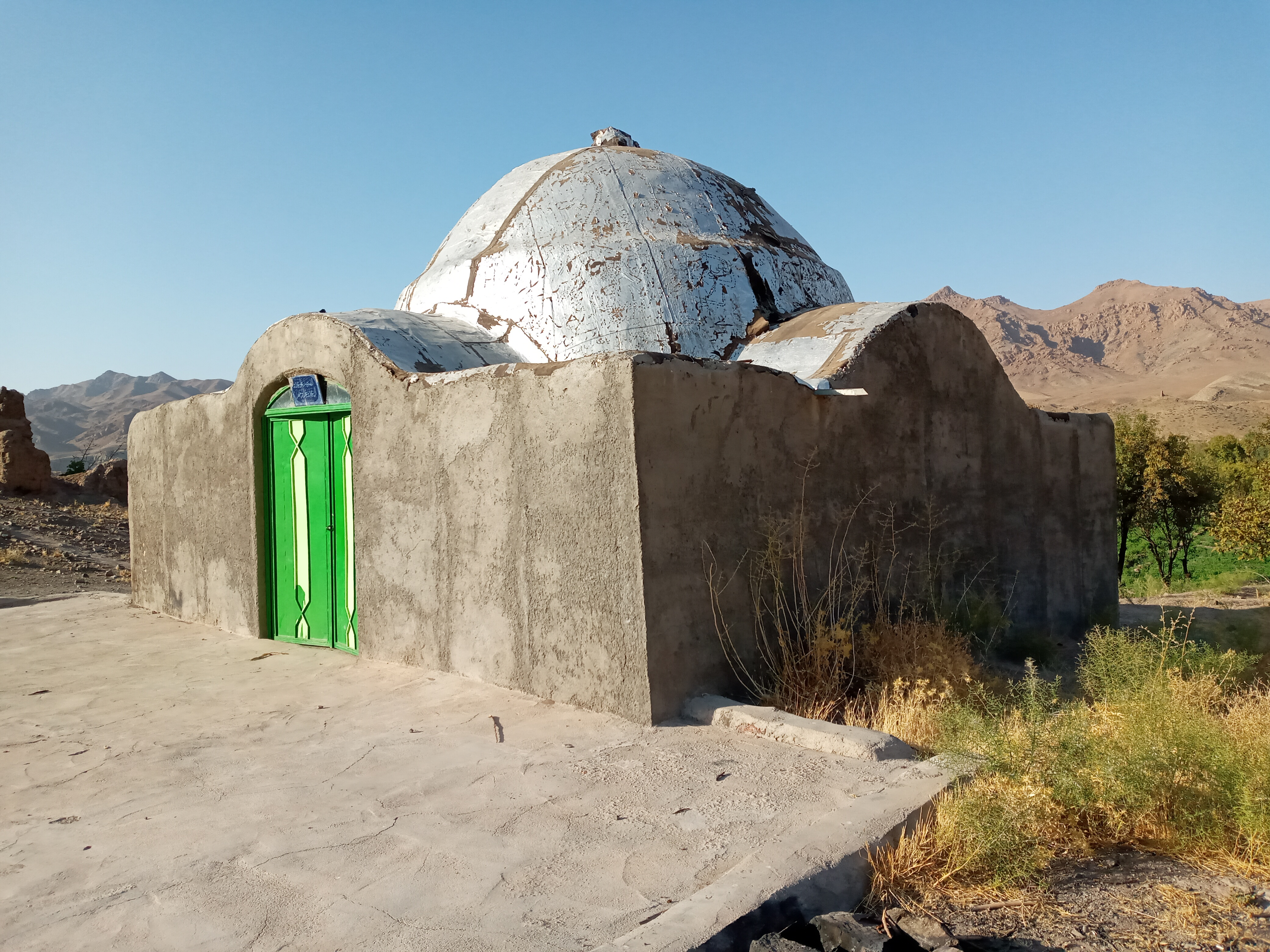
Ibrahim Mausoleum
