= Namaq =

Village in Razavi Khorasan province, Iran

Namaq Persian: نامق
- Village
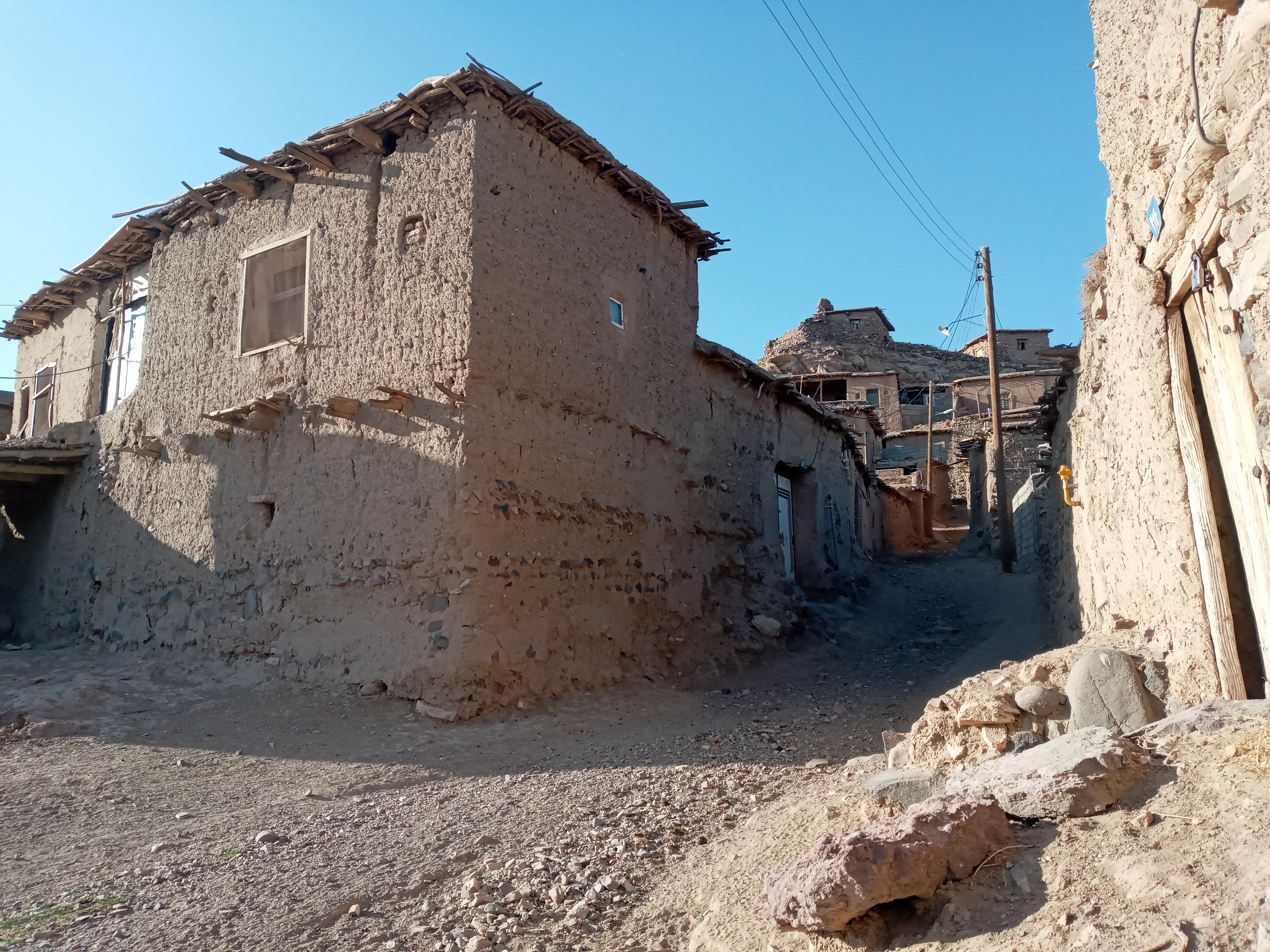
- The village of Namaq in 2021

- Location within Iran
- Coordinates: 35°24′47″N 58°45′47″E
- Country: Iran
- Province: Razavi Khorasan
- County: Kuhsorkh
- District: Central
- Rural District: Barkuh

Population (2016)
  - Total: 837
- Time zone: UTC+3:30 (IRST)

Namaq (Persian: نامق) (Note: Also romanized as Nāmeq; also known as Namagh, Nāmah-i-Haq, Nāmah-i-Haqq, and Nemāḩaq) is a village in Barkuh Rural District of the Central District in Kuhsorkh County, Razavi Khorasan province, Iran.

== Demographics ==
=== Population ===
At the time of the 2006 National Census, the village's population was 1,134 in 403 households, when it was in the former Kuhsorkh District of Kashmar County. The following census in 2011 counted 930 people in 377 households. The 2016 census measured the population of the village as 837 people in 337 households.

In 2019, the district was separated from the county in the establishment of Kuhsorkh County, and the rural district was transferred to the new Central District.

== Historical sites, ancient artifacts and tourism ==
=== Namaq Cemetery ===
The Namaq Cemetery is a historical cemetery related to the Safavid dynasty and is located in Kuhsorkh County.

=== Namaq Castle ===
Namaq Castle is a historical castle located in Namaq in Razavi Khorasan province, the longevity of which dates back to before of the Mongol conquest.

== Notable people ==
Sheikh Ahmad-e Jami was born here in 1048.
