= Daghi =

Daghi (Persian: داغي) may refer to:

- Daghi, Kashmar
- Daghi, Nishapur
