= Shahi Dam =

Ancient dam in Kariz, Iran

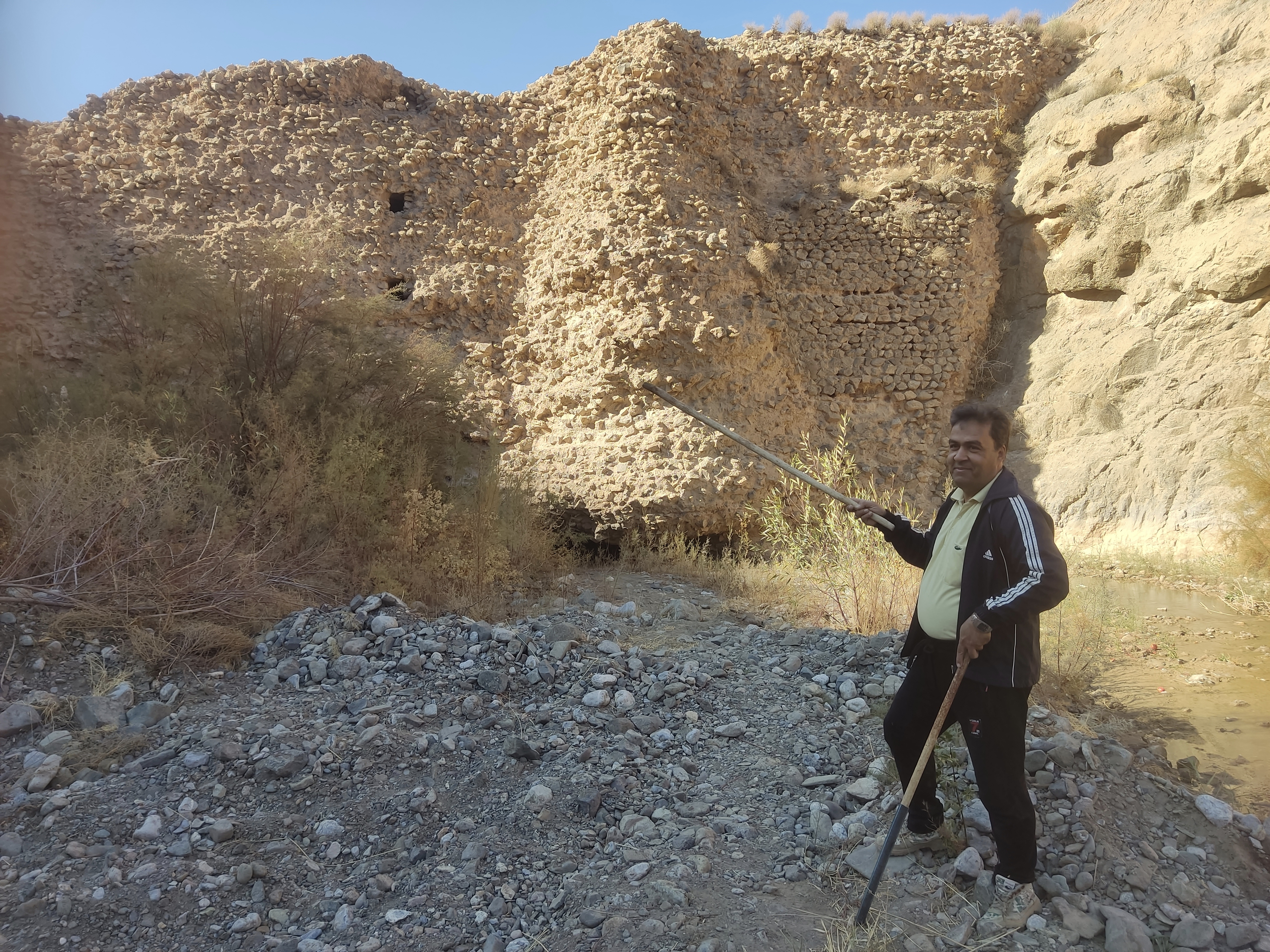
- Shesh Taraz Dam in 2021

- Location within Iran
- Official name: Shahi Dam
- Country: Iran
- Location: Kariz, Kuhsorkh County

Shahi Dam (Persian: سد شاهی), or Shesh Taraz Dam (Persian: بند شش‌طراز), was built about 700–1000 years ago and is located in Kariz, Kuhsorkh County.
