= Rivash, Iran =

City in Razavi Khorasan province, Iran

Rivash Persian: ريوش
- City
- A pond in the city of Rivash in 2022

- Location within Iran
- Coordinates: 35°28′31″N 58°27′33″E
- Country: Iran
- Province: Razavi Khorasan
- County: Kuhsorkh
- District: Central
- Established as a city: 1999

Population (2016)
  - Total: 5,687
- Time zone: UTC+3:30 (IRST)
- Website: rivashi.ir

Rivash (Persian: ريوش) (Note: Also romanized as Rīvash and Riwaŝ; also known as Raush and Rivūsh) is a city in the Central District of Kuhsorkh County, Razavi Khorasan province, Iran, serving as capital of both the county and the district. As a village, it was the capital of Barkuh Rural District until its capital was transferred to the village of Ivar.

== History ==
According to the evidence, this area was inhabited before the advent of Islam, and due to the fact that the old road of the southern cities of Razavi Khorasan to Tehran passed through this area, it has been more prosperous in the past. One of the most important historical events is the Mongol invasion, which after the occupation of Nishapur, due to its impassability and the large number of snakes in the area, Mongol horses and soldiers could not pass through this area and escaped its bite.

The village of Rivash was converted to a city in 1999.

== Demographics ==
=== Population ===
At the time of the 2006 National Census, the city's population was 4,610 in 1,277 households, when it was capital of the former Kuhsorkh District in Kashmar County. The following census in 2011 counted 5,762 people in 1,597 households. The 2016 census measured the population of the city as 5,687 people in 1,701 households.

In 2019, the district was separated from the county in the establishment of Kuhsorkh County, and Rivash was transferred to the new Central District as the county's capital.

== Climate ==
The climate of Rivash, is temperate and due to its lush nature, vegetation, dense trees, river, south and west of the city, it has a cool climate in summers and very cold winters. The average annual temperature is 25 degrees.

== Historical sites, ancient artifacts and tourism ==
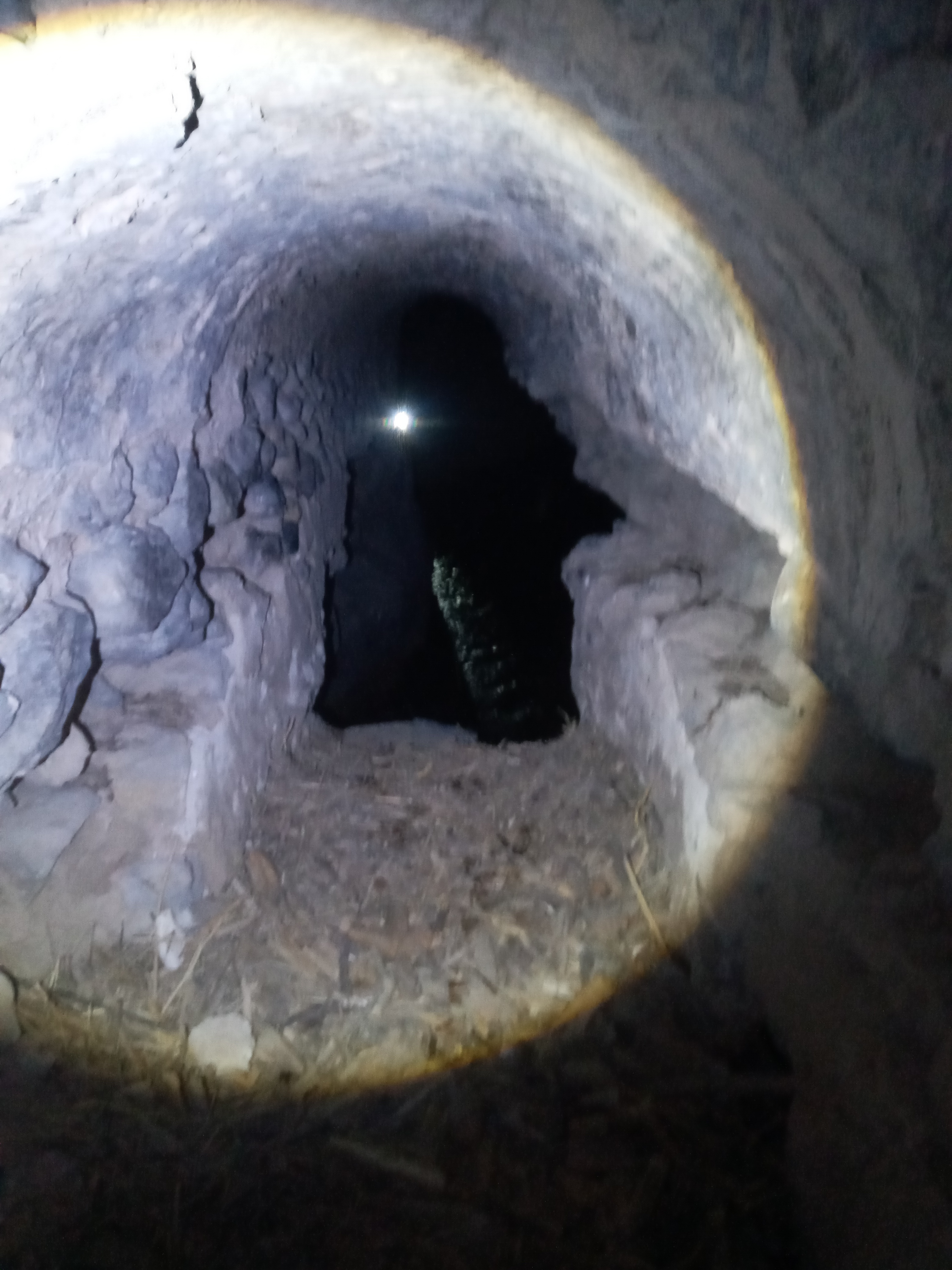
Shahi Dam

=== Shahi Dam ===
Shahi Dam was built about 700 to 1000 years ago and located in Kariz, Kuhsorkh County.

=== Band-e Qara Bathhouse ===
Band-e Qara Bathhouse is a historical bathhouse related to the Qajar dynasty and is located in Band-e Qara.

=== Band-e Qara Glacier ===
Band-e Qara Glacier is also located in Band-e Qara.

=== Baghdasht Peak ===
Baghdasht Mountain Range, the largest peak of which is 2,500 meters above sea level, is part of the Rivash heights and is located near the village of Kariz, 25 km northwest of Kashmar.

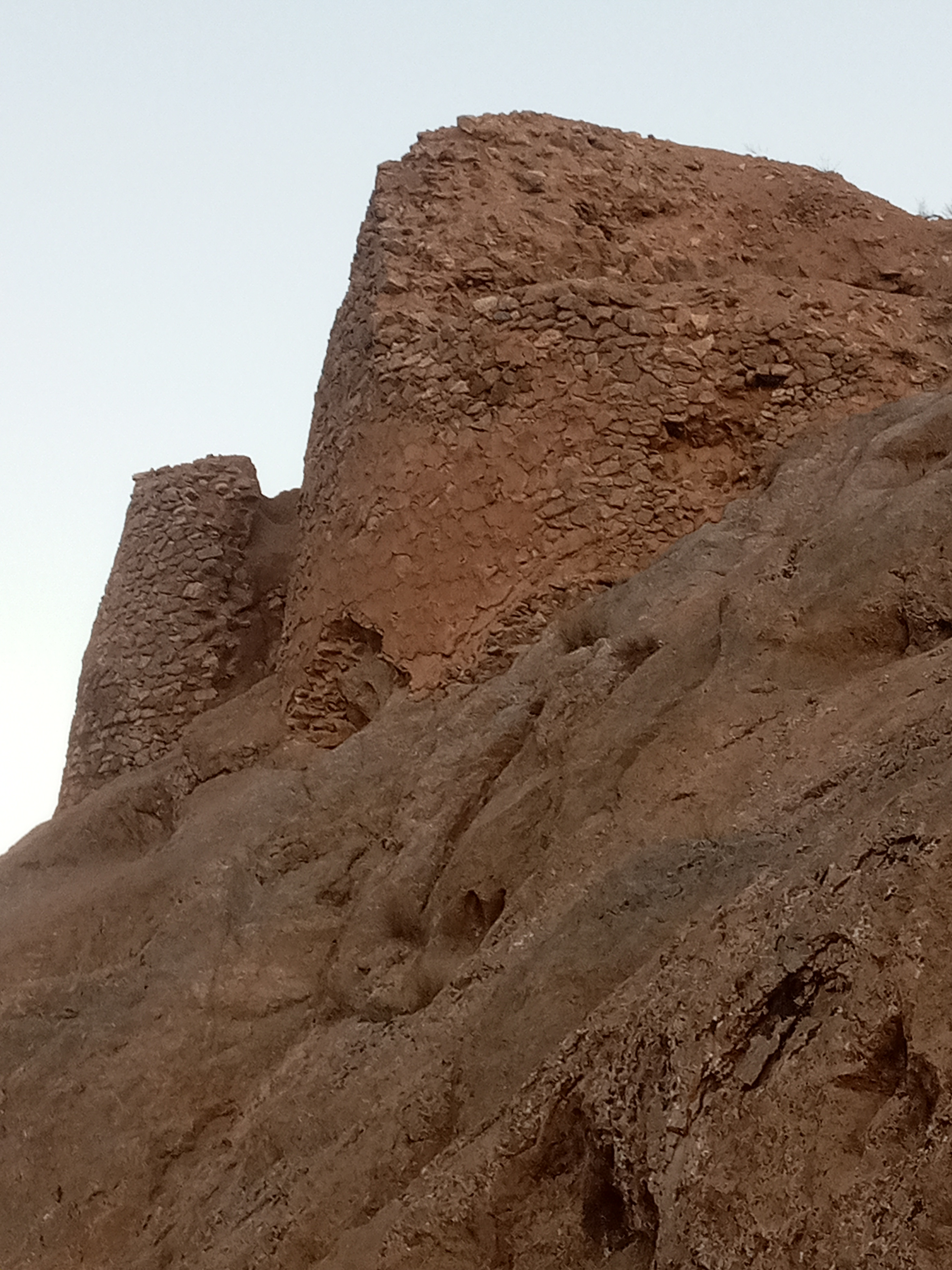
Qal'eh Dokhtar

=== Qal'eh Dokhtar, Kuhsorkh ===
Qal'eh Dokhtar is a historical castle located in Kuhsorkh County in Razavi Khorasan province. The longevity of this fortress dates back to the Nizari Ismaili state.

=== Gabar Hesar Castle ===
Gabar Hesar Castle is a Castle related to the second century AH and is also located in Kuhsorkh County.

=== Nameq Village ===
Nameq is located in a hilly area and many mountains surround the village. It has many historical sites, for example, the tomb of the great Gnostic Sheikh Abol Hassan (father of Sheikh Ahmad-e Jami) is located 500 metres (1,600 ft) away from the village in a green plain. In addition, there are the remains of an ancient castle, pre-Islamic and post-Islamic cemeteries, a citadel, mosques and other beautiful pieces of architecture.

=== Namaq Cemetery ===
The Namaq Cemetery is a historical cemetery related to the Safavid dynasty and is located in Namaq.

=== Namaq Castle ===
Namaq Castle is a historical castle located in Namaq. The longevity of this fortress dates back to the Before the Mongol conquest.
