= Kharu =

Kharu may refer to:

- Kharu, Kashmar, Razavi Khorasan Province
- Kharu, a Chuhra caste
- Khowr, Razavi Khorasan

== See also ==
- Kharv
- Kharv, South Khorasan
