= Kuh Sefid Rural District (Kuhsorkh County) =

Rural district in Razavi Khorasan Province, Iran

Kuh Sefid Rural District Persian: دهستان کوه سفید
- Rural District
- Location within Iran
- Coordinates: 35°34′N 58°35′E
- Country: Iran
- Province: Razavi Khorasan
- County: Kuhsorkh
- District: Central
- Established: 2019
- Capital: Tavalli
- Time zone: UTC+3:30 (IRST)

Kuh Sefid Rural District (Persian: دهستان کوه سفید) is in the Central District of Kuhsorkh County, Razavi Khorasan province, Iran. Its capital is the village of Tavalli, whose population at the time of the 2016 National Census was 965 in 334 households.

== History ==
In 2019, Kuhsorkh District was separated from Kashmar County in the establishment of Kuhsorkh County, and Kuh Sefid Rural District was created in the new Central District.

== Other villages in the rural district ==
- Akbarabad
- Aliabad
- Bakhtiar
- Chalpu
- Kusheh
- Maki
