= Band-e Qara =

Village in Razavi Khorasan province, Iran

Band-e Qara Persian: بندقرا
- Village
- Location within Iran
- Coordinates: 35°30′17″N 58°12′40″E
- Country: Iran
- Province: Razavi Khorasan
- County: Kuhsorkh
- District: Barrud
- Rural District: Barrud

Population (2016)
  - Total: 305
- Time zone: UTC+3:30 (IRST)

Band-e Qara (Persian: بندقرا) (Note: Also romanized as Band Qorā, Band-e Qarā’, and Band-e Qorā‘; also known as Band-e Karīz, Band-e Qārez, and Band-i-Kāriz) is a village in Barrud Rural District of Barrud District in Kuhsorkh County, Razavi Khorasan province, Iran.

== Demographics ==
=== Population ===
At the time of the 2006 National Census, the village's population was 556 in 164 households, when it was in the former Kuhsorkh District of Kashmar County. The following census in 2011 counted 325 people in 117 households. The 2016 census measured the population of the village as 305 people in 100 households.

In 2019, the district was separated from the county in the establishment of Kuhsorkh County, and the rural district was transferred to the new Barrud District.

== Historical sites, ancient artifacts and tourism ==
Band-e Qara Bathhouse is a historical public bath related to the Qajar dynasty.

Natural Yakhchāl of Band-e Qara is a natural yakhchāl (icehouse).

== Notable people ==
Iranian cleric Javad Nikbin is from here.
