= Band-e Qara Glacier =

Historical bathhouse

Band-e Qara Glacier (Persian: یخچال طبیعی بند قرا) is a Glacier, located in Band-e Qara, Razavi Khorasan Province.
