= Rivash =

Rivash may refer to:

- Rabbi Israel Baal Shem Tov (1698–1760), the founder of Chassidic movement
- Rabbi Isaac ben Sheshet (1328–1408), a Spanish Talmudic authority
- Rivash, Iran, a city in Iran
