= Kariz, Kuhsorkh =

Village in Razavi Khorasan province, Iran

Kariz Persian: كريز
- Village
- Location within Iran
- Coordinates: 35°27′45″N 58°17′58″E
- Country: Iran
- Province: Razavi Khorasan
- County: Kuhsorkh
- District: Barrud
- Rural District: Barrud

Population (2016)
  - Total: 689
- Time zone: UTC+3:30 (IRST)

Kariz (Persian: كريز) (Note: Also romanized as Karīz and Kerīz) is a village in Barrud Rural District of Barrud District in Kuhsorkh County, Razavi Khorasan province, Iran.

== Demographics ==
=== Population ===
At the time of the 2006 National Census, the village's population was 996 in 311 households, when it was in the former Kuhsorkh District of Kashmar County. The following census in 2011 counted 726 people in 287 households. The 2016 census measured the population of the village as 689 people in 283 households.

In 2019, the district was separated from the county in the establishment of Kuhsorkh County, and the rural district was transferred to the new Barrud District.
