= Barrud Rural District =

Rural district in Razavi Khorasan province, Iran

Barrud Rural District Persian: دهستان بررود
- Rural District
- Location within Iran
- Coordinates: 35°27′N 58°19′E
- Country: Iran
- Province: Razavi Khorasan
- County: Kuhsorkh
- District: Barrud
- Established: 1987
- Capital: Tarq

Population (2016)
  - Total: 3,586
- Time zone: UTC+3:30 (IRST)

Barrud Rural District (Persian: دهستان بررود) is in Barrud District of Kuhsorkh County, Razavi Khorasan province, Iran. Its capital is the village of Tarq.

== Demographics ==
=== Population ===
At the time of the 2006 National Census, the rural district's population (as a part of the former Kuhsorkh District in Kashmar County) was 4,684 in 1,411 households. There were 3,947 inhabitants in 1,346 households at the following census of 2011. The 2016 census measured the population of the rural district as 3,586 in 1,323 households. The most populous of its 101 villages was Tarq, with 1,507 people.

In 2019, the district was separated from the county in the establishment of Kuhsorkh County, and the rural district was transferred to the new Barrud District.

=== Other villages in the rural district ===
- Band-e Qara
- Kalateh-ye Pain Darreh
- Kalateh-ye Teymur
- Kariz
- Kharu
- Qaracheh
- Tajrud
