= Takab Rural District (Kuhsorkh County) =

Rural district in Razavi Khorasan province, Iran

Takab Rural District Persian: دهستان تكاب
- Rural District
- Location within Iran
- Coordinates: 35°41′N 58°20′E
- Country: Iran
- Province: Razavi Khorasan
- County: Kuhsorkh
- District: Barrud
- Established: 1987
- Capital: Avandar

Population (2016)
  - Total: 4,384
- Time zone: UTC+3:30 (IRST)

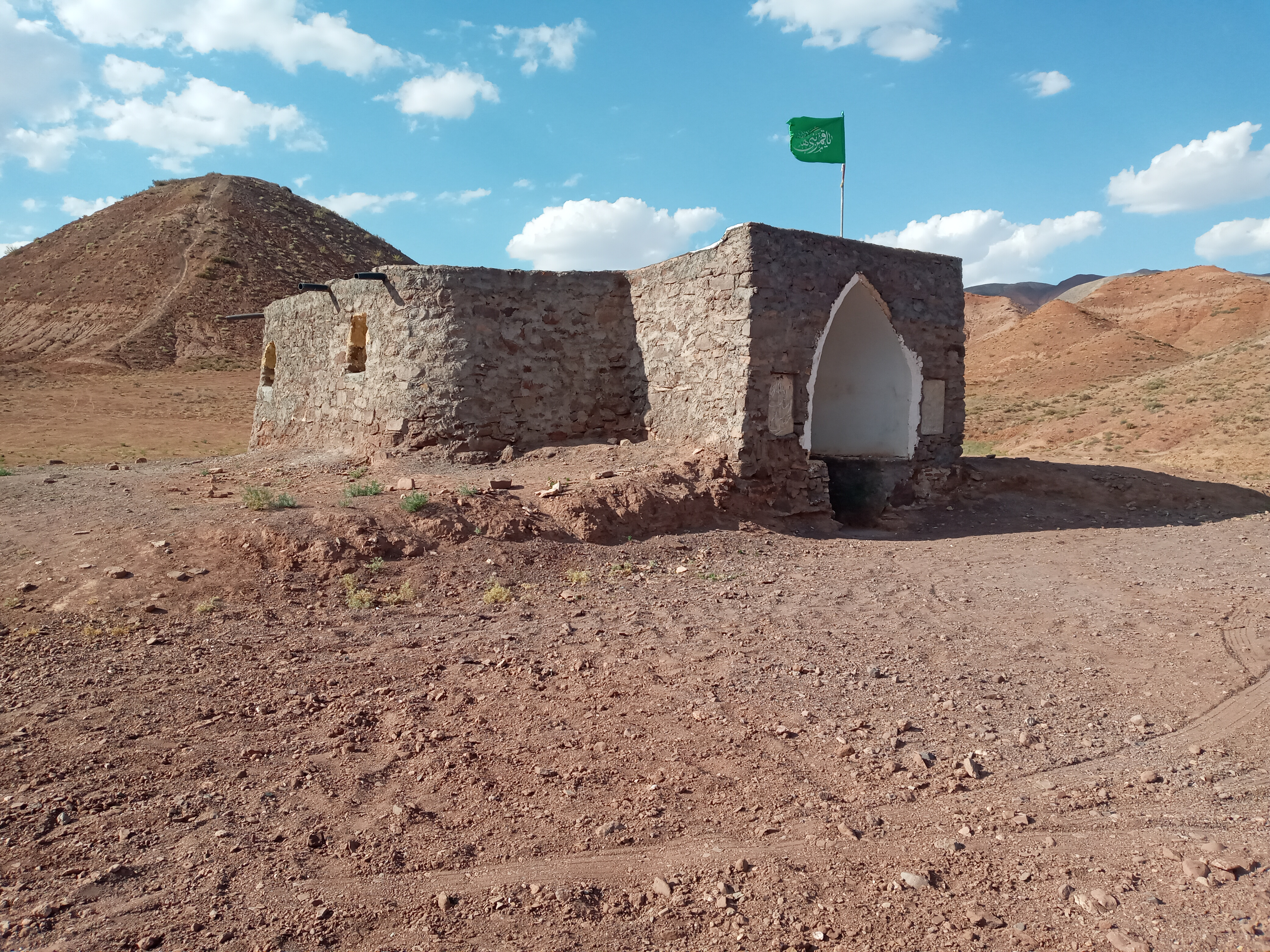
Posht Panjeh Pedar Mausoleum in Takab Rural District

Takab Rural District (Persian: دهستان تكاب) is in Barrud District of Kuhsorkh County, Razavi Khorasan province, Iran. Its capital is the village of Avandar.

== Demographics ==
=== Population ===
At the time of the 2006 National Census, the rural district's population (as a part of the former Kuhsorkh District in Kashmar County) was 5,772 in 1,482 households. There were 4,857 inhabitants in 1,470 households at the following census of 2011. The 2016 census measured the population of the rural district as 4,384 in 1,338 households. The most populous of its 59 villages was Avandar, with 996 people.

In 2019, the district was separated from the county in the establishment of Kuhsorkh County, and the rural district was transferred to the new Barrud District.

=== Other villages in the rural district ===
- Daghi
- Deh-e Mian
- Khezr Beyg
- Khezrabad
- Qosun
- Senjedak
- Tavandar
