= Barkuh Rural District =

Rural district in Razavi Khorasan province, Iran

Barkuh Rural District Persian: دهستان بركوه
- Rural District
- Location within Iran
- Coordinates: 35°28′N 58°36′E
- Country: Iran
- Province: Razavi Khorasan
- County: Kuhsorkh
- District: Central
- Established: 1987
- Capital: Ivar

Population (2016)
  - Total: 11,357
- Time zone: UTC+3:30 (IRST)

Barkuh Rural District (Persian: دهستان بركوه) is in the Central District of Kuhsorkh County, Razavi Khorasan province, Iran. Its capital is the village of Ivar. The previous capital of the rural district was the village of Rivash, now a city.

== Demographics ==
=== Population ===
At the time of the 2006 National Census, the rural district's population (as a part of the former Kuhsorkh District in Kashmar County) was 11,963 in 3,241 households. There were 11,692 inhabitants in 3,624 households at the following census of 2011. The 2016 census measured the population of the rural district as 11,357 in 3,642 households. The most populous of its 206 villages was Ivar, with 2,753 people.

In 2019, the district was separated from the county in the establishment of Kuhsorkh County, and the rural district was transferred to the new Central District.

=== Other villages in the rural district ===
- Kusheh Nama
- Mushak
- Namaq
- Tanurjeh
