= Central District (Kuhsorkh County) =

District in Razavi Khorasan province, Iran

Central District (Kuhsorkh County) Persian: بخش مرکزی شهرستان کوهسرخ
- District
- Location within Iran
- Coordinates: 35°31′N 58°36′E
- Country: Iran
- Province: Razavi Khorasan
- County: Kuhsorkh
- Established: 2019
- Capital: Rivash
- Time zone: UTC+3:30 (IRST)

The Central District of Kuhsorkh County (Persian: بخش مرکزی شهرستان کوهسرخ) is in Razavi Khorasan province, Iran. Its capital is the city of Rivash, whose population at the time of the 2016 National Census was 5,687 in 1,701 households.

== History ==
In 2019, Kuhsorkh District was separated from Kashmar County in the establishment of Kuhsorkh County, which was divided into two districts of two rural districts each, with Rivash as its capital and only city at the time.

== Demographics ==
=== Administrative divisions ===
Central District (Kuhsorkh County)
Administrative Divisions
Barkuh RD
Kuh Sefid RD
Rivash (city)
RD = Rural District
