= Barrud District =

District in Razavi Khorasan province, Iran

Barrud District Persian: بخش بررود
- District
- Location within Iran
- Coordinates: 35°36′N 58°20′E
- Country: Iran
- Province: Razavi Khorasan
- County: Kuhsorkh
- Established: 2019
- Capital: Tarq
- Time zone: UTC+3:30 (IRST)

Barrud District (Persian: بخش بررود) is in Kuhsorkh County, Razavi Khorasan province, Iran. Its capital is the village of Tarq, whose population at the time of the 2016 National Census was 1,507 in 572 households.

== History ==
In 2019, Kuhsorkh District was separated from Kashmar County in the establishment of Kuhsorkh County, which was divided into two districts of two rural districts each, with Rivash as its capital and only city at the time.

== Demographics ==
=== Administrative divisions ===
Barrud District
Administrative Divisions
Barrud RD
Takab RD
RD = Rural District
