= Kuhsorkh County =

County in Razavi Khorasan Province, Iran

Kuhsorkh County Persian: شهرستان کوهسرخ
- County
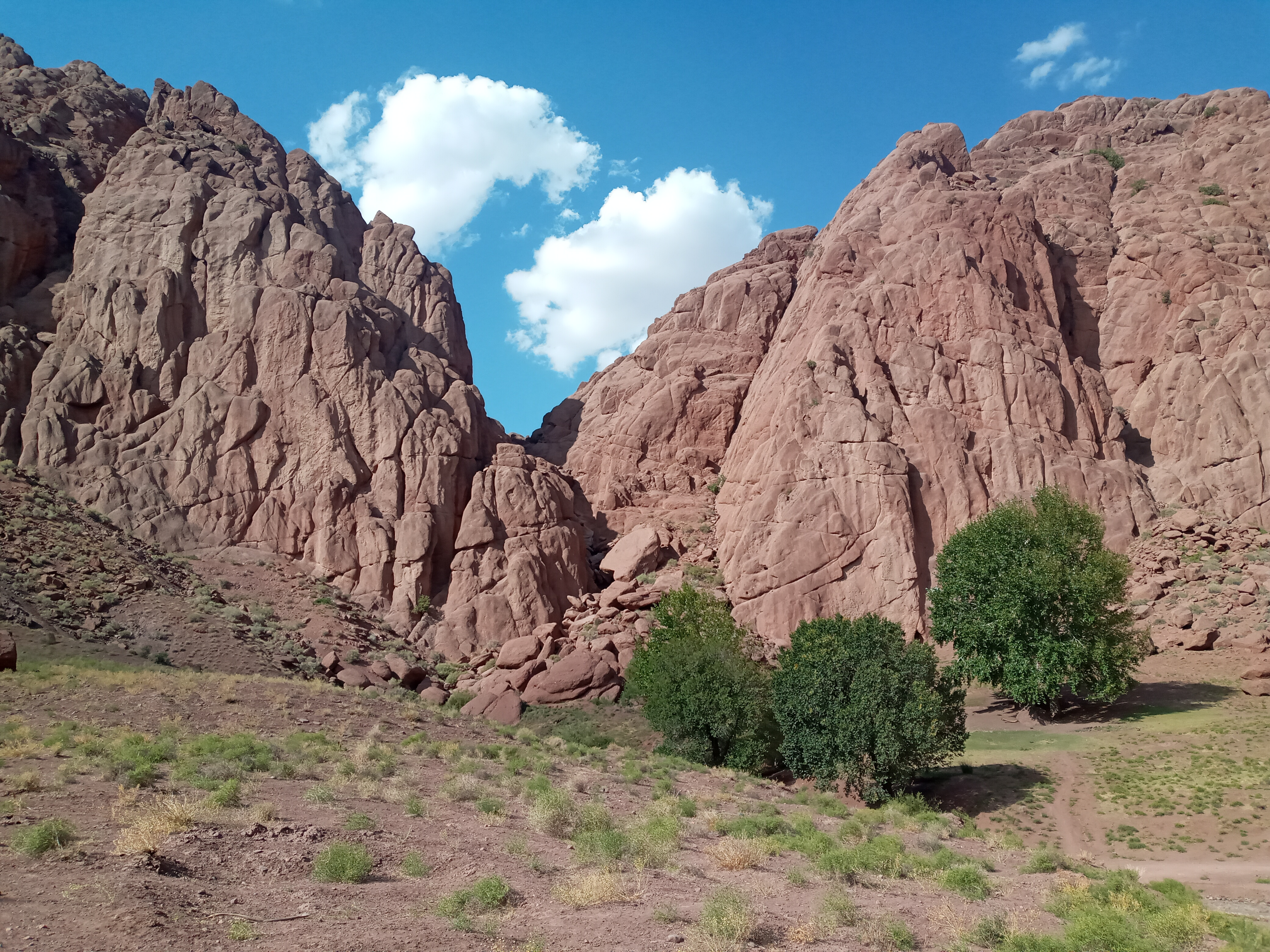
- Avandar

- Location of Kuhsorkh County in Razavi Khorasan province (center left, purple)

- Location of Razavi Khorasan province in Iran
- Coordinates: 35°36′N 58°28′E
- Country: Iran
- Province: Razavi Khorasan
- Established: 2019
- Capital: Rivash
- Districts: Central, Barrud

Area
  - Total: 2,198 km^{2} (849 sq mi)
- Time zone: UTC+3:30 (IRST)

Kuhsorkh County (Persian: شهرستان کوهسرخ) is in Razavi Khorasan Province, Iran. Its capital is the city of Rivash, whose population at the time of the 2016 National Census was 5,687 in 1,701 households.

== History ==
In 2019, Kuhsorkh District was separated from Kashmar County in the establishment of Kuhsorkh County, which was divided into two districts of two rural districts each, with Rivash as its capital and only city at the time.

== Demographics ==
=== Administrative divisions ===
Kuhsorkh County's administrative structure is shown in the following table.

Kuhsorkh County
Administrative Divisions
Central District
Barkuh RD
Kuh Sefid RD
Rivash (city)
Barrud District
Barrud RD
Takab RD
RD = Rural District

== See also ==
Media related to Kuhsorkh County at Wikimedia Commons
