= Kuhsorkh District =

Former district in Razavi Khorasan province, Iran

Kuhsorkh District Persian: بخش کوهسرخ
- Former District
- Location within Iran
- Coordinates: 35°36′N 58°28′E
- Country: Iran
- Province: Razavi Khorasan
- County: Kashmar
- Capital: Rivash

Population (2016)
  - Total: 25,014
- Time zone: UTC+3:30 (IRST)

Kuhsorkh District (Persian: بخش کوهسرخ) is a former administrative division of Kashmar County, Razavi Khorasan province, Iran. Its capital was the city of Rivash.

== History ==
In 2019, the district was separated from the county in the establishment of Kuhsorkh County.

== Demographics ==
=== Population ===
At the time of the 2006 National Census, the district's population was 27,029 in 7,411 households. The following census in 2011 counted 26,258 people in 8,037 households. The 2016 census measured the population of the district as 25,014 inhabitants in 8,004 households.

=== Administrative divisions ===
Kuhsorkh District Population
Administrative Divisions	2006	2011	2016
Barkuh RD	11,963	11,692	11,357
Barrud RD	4,684	3,947	3,586
Takab RD	5,772	4,857	4,384
Rivash (city)	4,610	5,762	5,687
Total	27,029	26,258	25,014
RD = Rural District
