= Jameh Mosque of Kashmar =

Mosque in Kashmar, Razavi Khorasan, Iran

Jāmeh Mosque of Kashmar
- مسجد جامع کاشمر
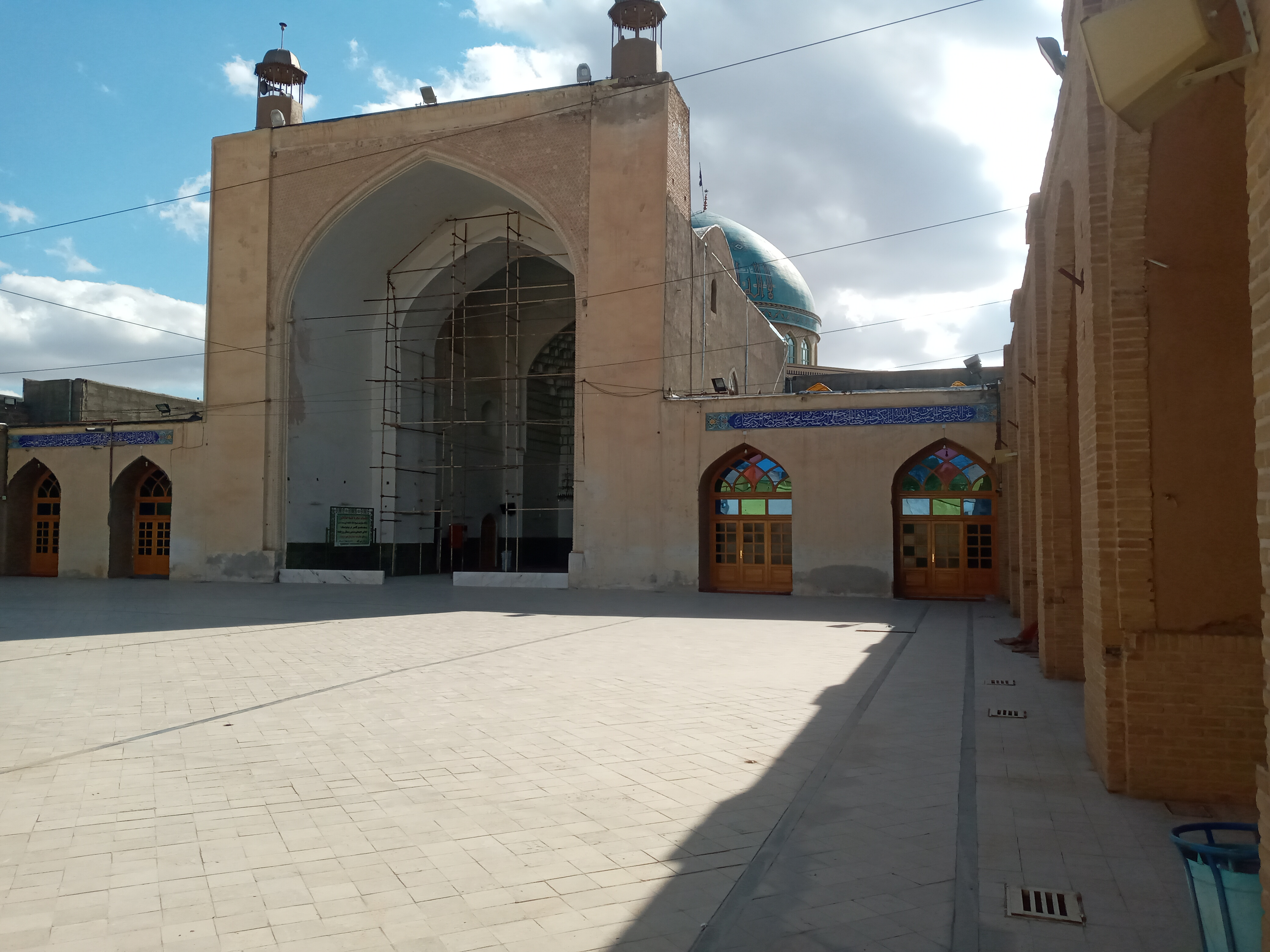
- The mosque in 2021

- Location of the mosque in Iran

Religion
- Affiliation: Shia Islam
- Ecclesiastical or organizational status: Friday mosque
- Status: Active

Location
- Location: Kashmar, Razavi Khorasan province
- Country: Iran
- Interactive map of Jāmeh Mosque of Kashmar
- Coordinates: 35°13′56″N 58°27′44″E

Architecture
- Architects: Mohammad Esfahani; Ismail Azani
- Type: Mosque architecture
- Style: Qajar
- Founder: Fath-Ali Shah Qajar
- Completed: 1791 CE

Specifications
- Capacity: c. 6000 worshippers
- Dome: Two
- Materials: Bricks; mortar; tiles

Iran National Heritage List
- Official name: Jāmeh Mosque of Kashmar
- Type: Built
- Designated: 16 March 2002
- Reference no.: 5152
- Conservation organization: Cultural Heritage, Handicrafts and Tourism Organization of Iran

The Jāmeh Mosque of Kashmar (Persian: مسجد جامع کاشمر; Arabic: الجامع الكبير كاشمر) is a Shi'ite Friday mosque (jāmeh) located in Kashmar, in the province of Razavi Khorasan, Iran. Them mosque is situated opposite the Amin al-tojar Caravansarai.

== Overview ==
Built in 1791 by Fath-Ali Shah Qajar, the mosque was added to the Iran National Heritage List on 16 March 2002, administered by the Cultural Heritage, Handicrafts and Tourism Organization of Iran.

Imam Mohsen Rezaee delivered a lecture in the mosque on March 17, 2013.

== Gallery ==
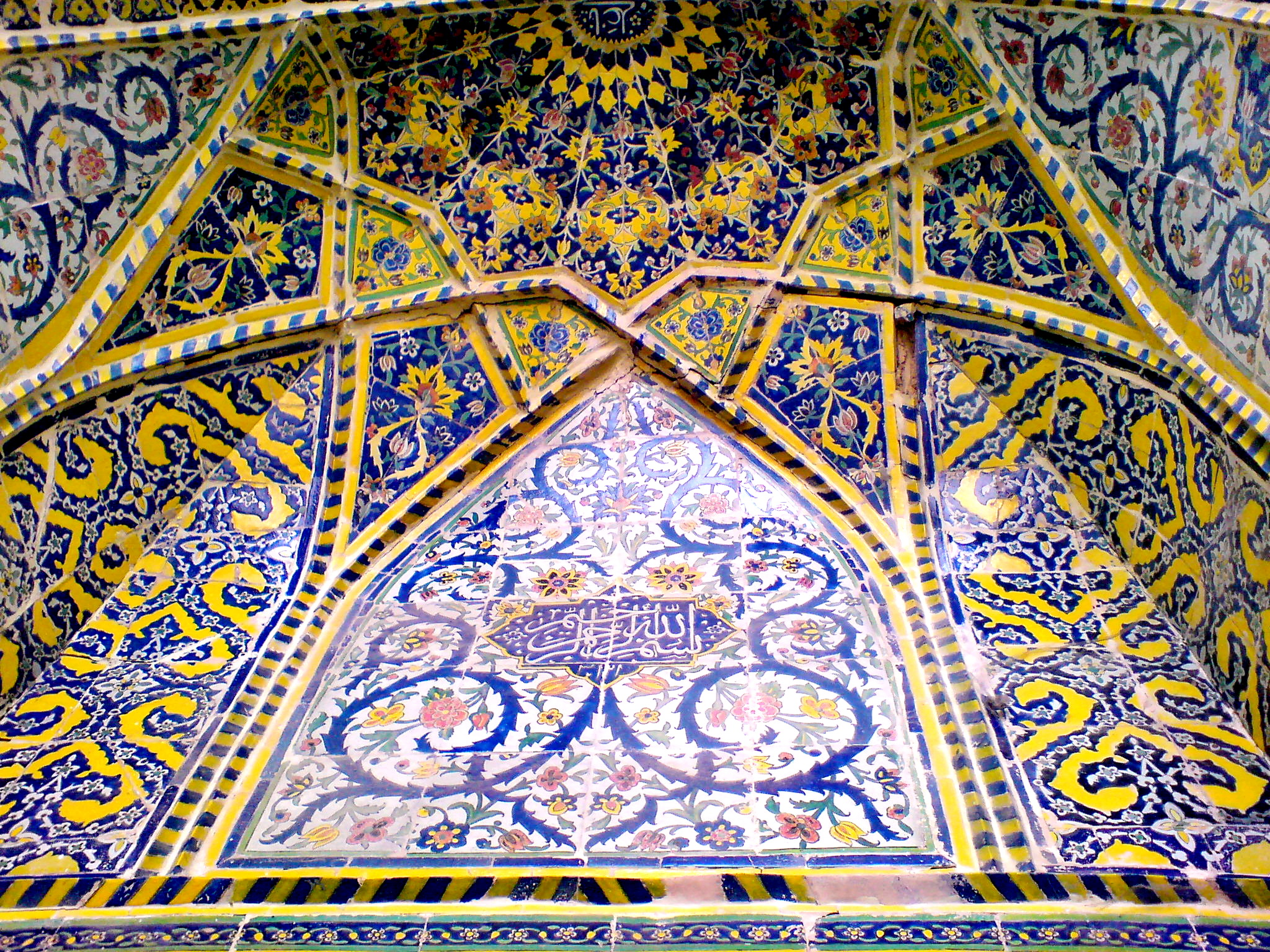
Mosque mihrab

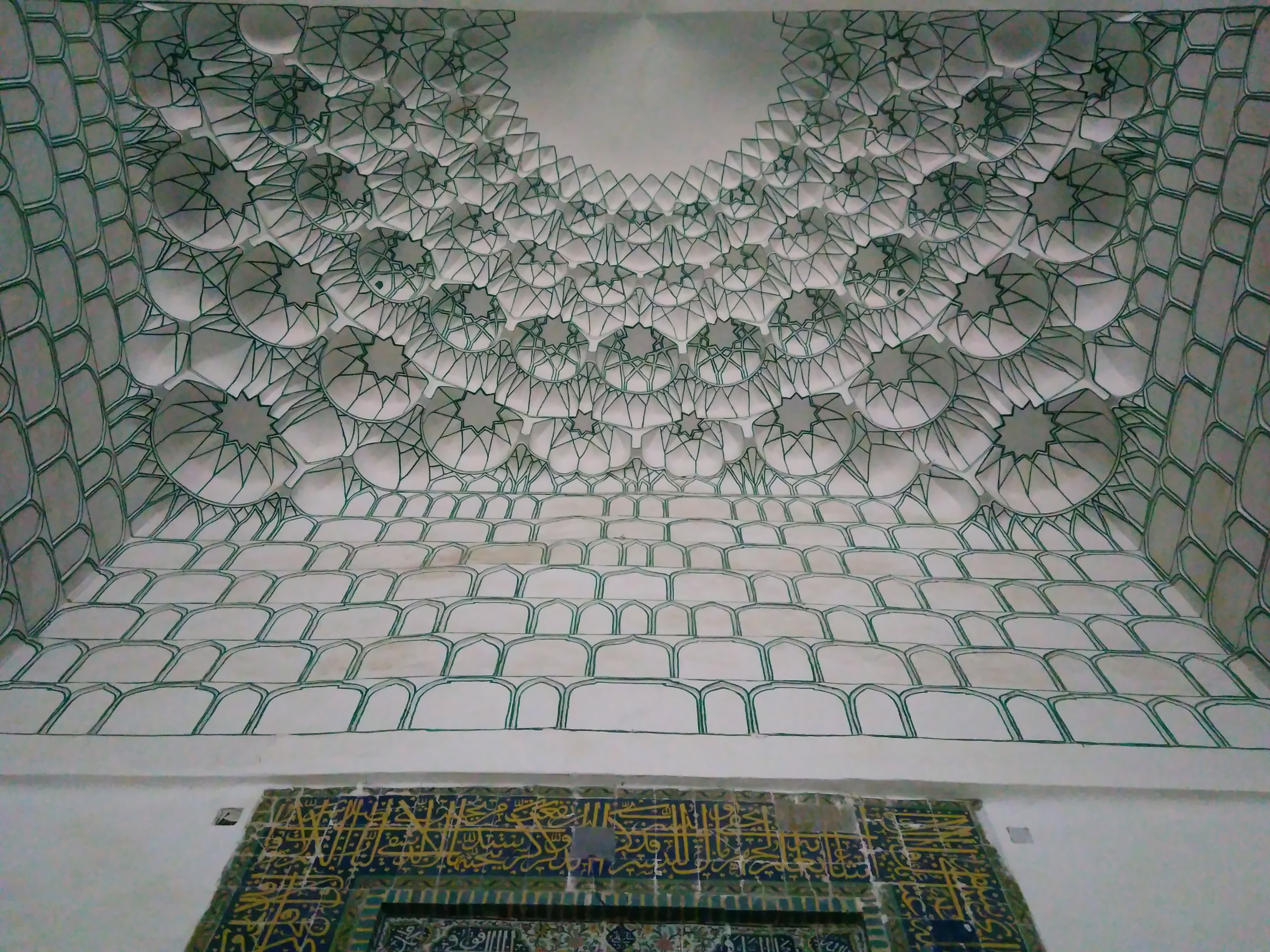
View of the mosque

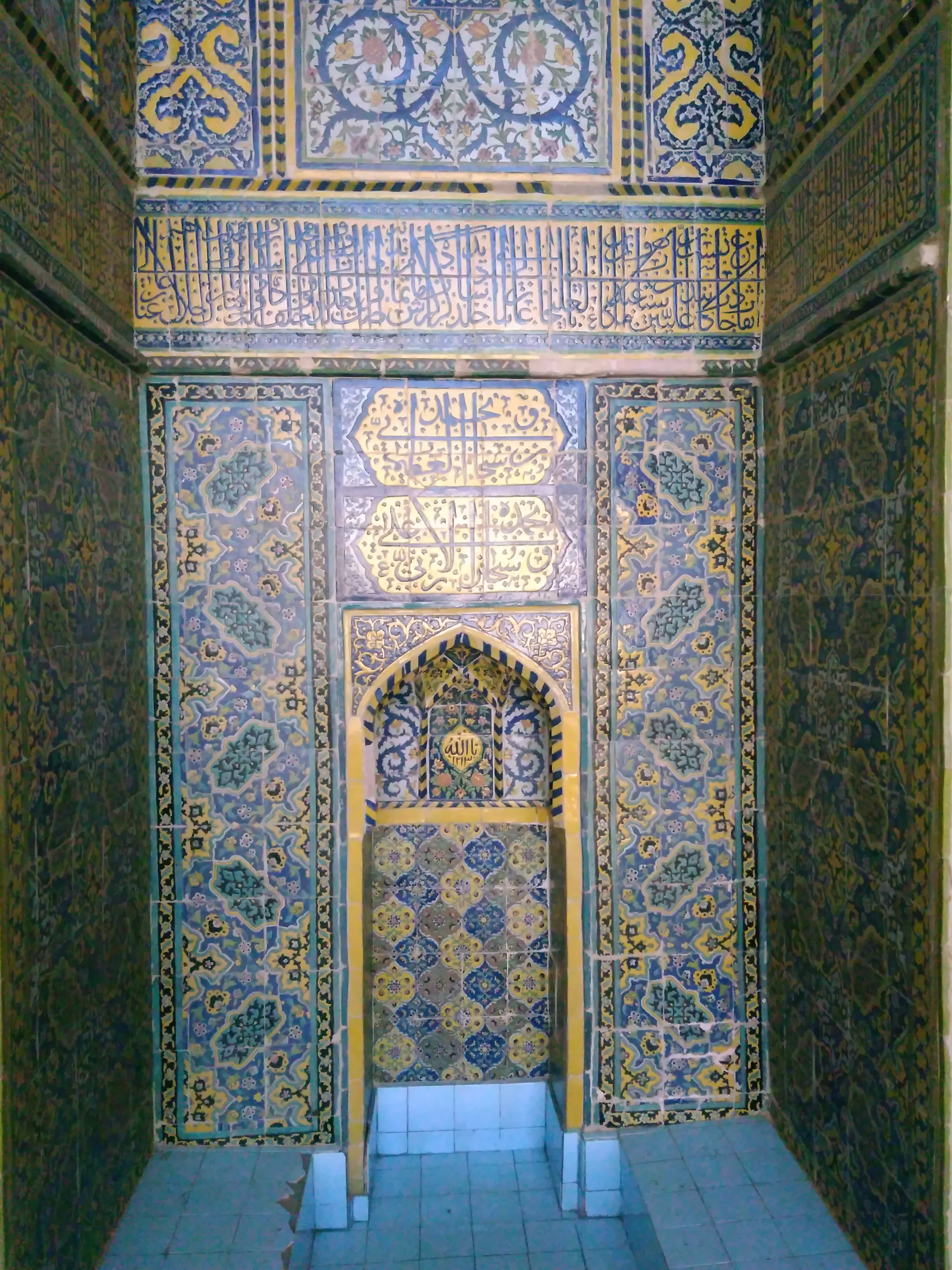
View of the mosque

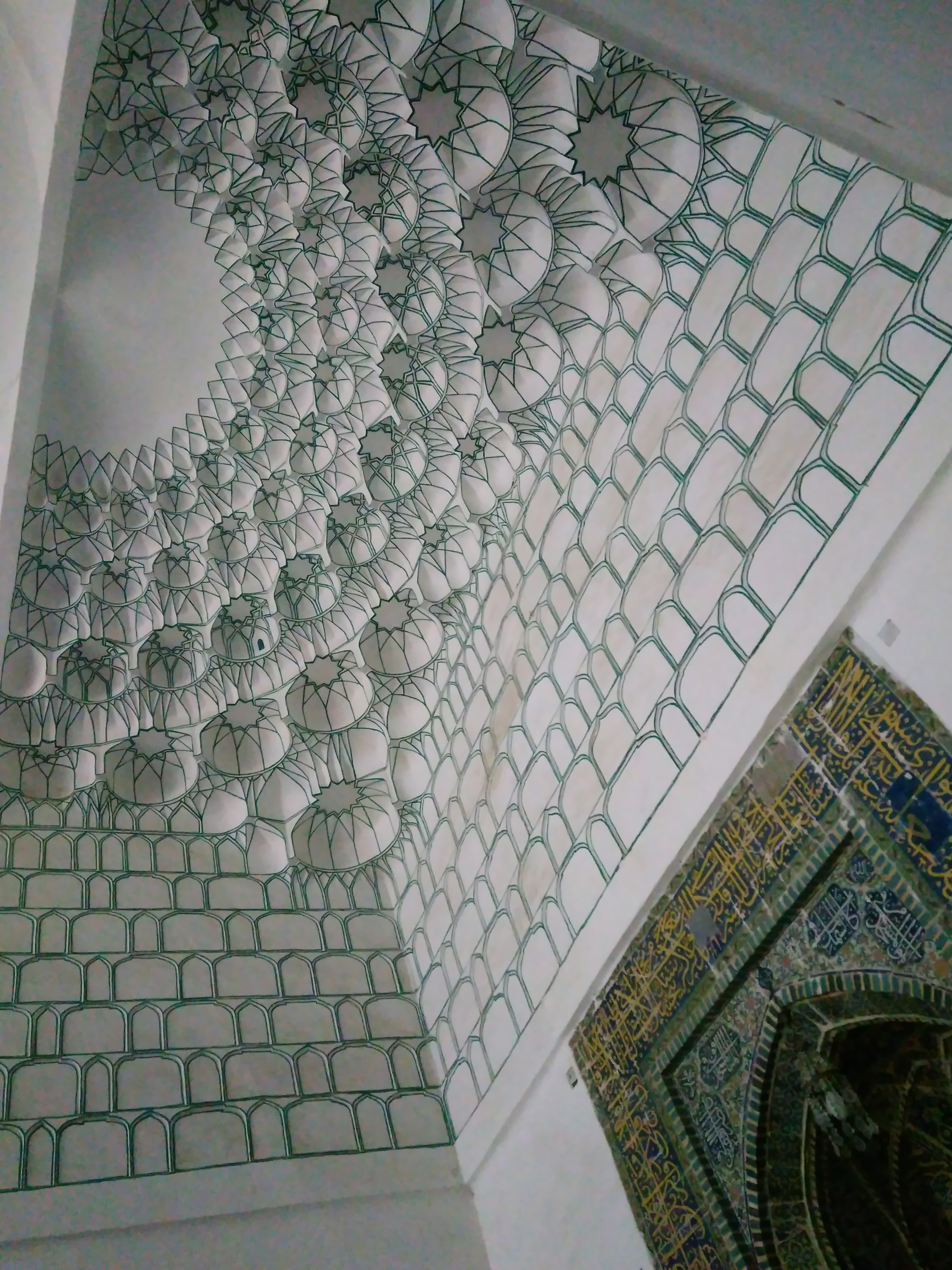
View of the mosque

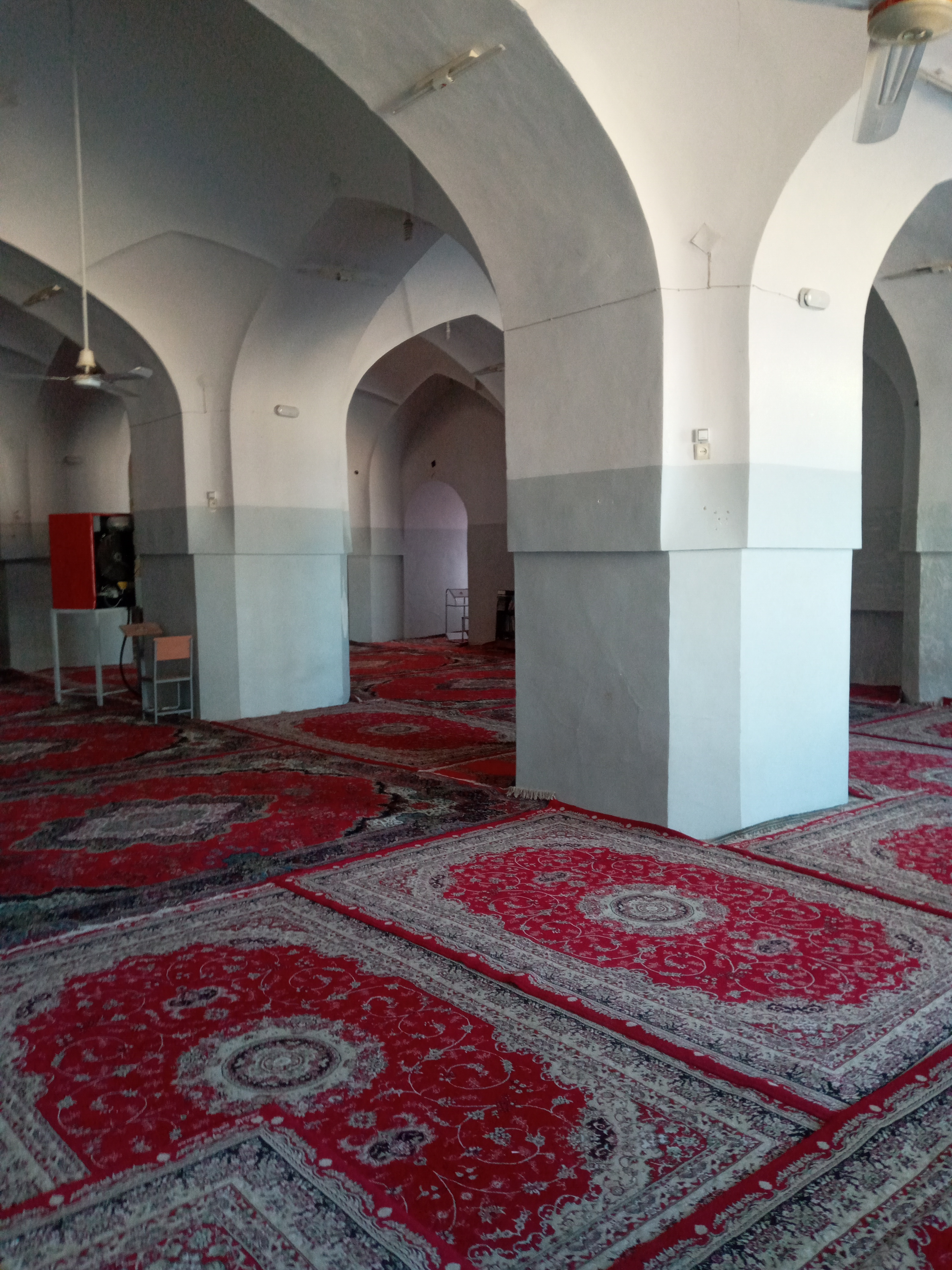
Inside the mosque

== See also ==
- Shia Islam in Iran
- List of mosques in Iran
