= Amin al-tojar Caravansarai =

- کاروانسرای امین التجار
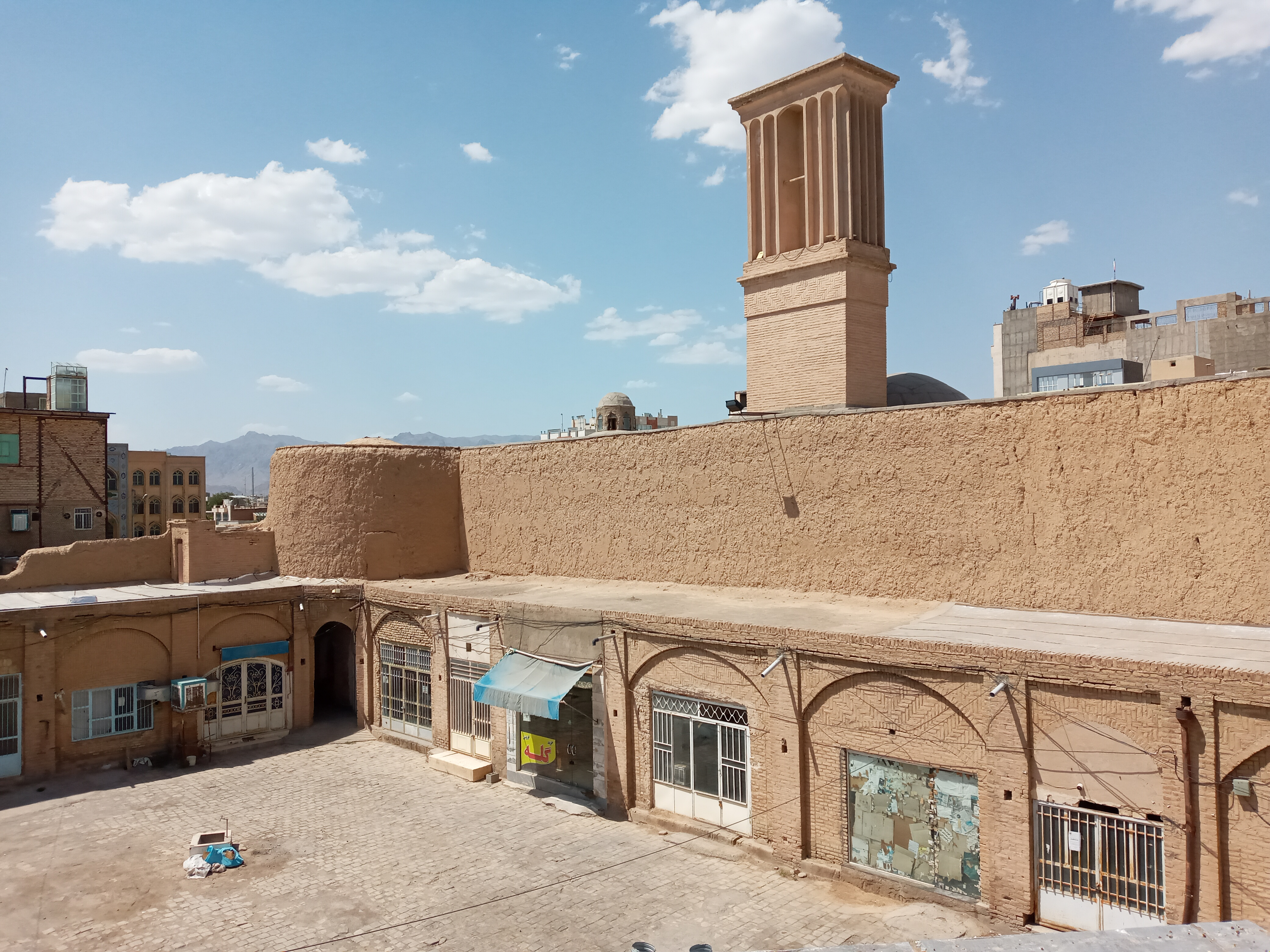
- Interactive map of the Amin al-tojar Caravansarai area

General information
- Type: Caravanserai
- Architectural style: Qajar architecture
- Location: Kashmar, Razavi Khorasan province, Iran
- Coordinates: 35°14′00″N 58°27′44″E
- Construction started: Qajar Iran

Amin al-tojar Caravansarai (Persian: کاروانسرای امین التجار) is a caravanserai related to the Qajar era and is located in Kashmar. This Caravansarai is opposite the Jameh Mosque of Kashmar.

== See also ==
- Arg of Kashmar
