= Barazq =

Village in Razavi Khorasan province, Iran

Barazq Persian: برازق
- Village
- Location within Iran
- Coordinates: 35°59′20″N 57°44′16″E
- Country: Iran
- Province: Razavi Khorasan
- County: Sheshtamad
- District: Central
- Rural District: Beyhaq

Population (2016)
  - Total: 589
- Time zone: UTC+3:30 (IRST)

Barazq (Persian: برازق) (Note: Also romanized as Barāzq) is a village in Beyhaq Rural District of the Central District in Sheshtamad County, Razavi Khorasan province, Iran.

== Demographics ==
=== Population ===
At the time of the 2006 National Census, the village's population was 772 in 219 households, when it was in the former Sheshtamad District of Sabzevar County. The following census in 2011 counted 698 people in 222 households. The 2016 census measured the population of the village as 589 people in 213 households.

In 2020, the district was separated from the county in the establishment of Sheshtamad County, and the rural district was transferred to the new Central District.
