= Cheshmeh Avash =

Village in Razavi Khorasan province, Iran

Cheshmeh Avash Persian: چشمه اوش
- Village
- Location within Iran
- Coordinates: 36°02′40″N 57°56′07″E
- Country: Iran
- Province: Razavi Khorasan
- County: Sheshtamad
- District: Central
- Rural District: Beyhaq

Population (2016)
  - Total: 375
- Time zone: UTC+3:30 (IRST)

Cheshmeh Avash (Persian: چشمه اوش) (Note: Also romanized as Cheshmeh Āvash; also known as Cheshmeh Āveshk) is a village in Beyhaq Rural District of the Central District in Sheshtamad County, Razavi Khorasan province, Iran.

== Demographics ==
=== Population ===
At the time of the 2006 National Census, the village's population was 332 in 73 households, when it was in the former Sheshtamad District of Sabzevar County. The following census in 2011 counted 748 people in 176 households. The 2016 census measured the population of the village as 375 people in 94 households.

In 2020, the district was separated from the county in the establishment of Sheshtamad County, and the rural district was transferred to the new Central District.
