= Hasanabad, Rob-e Shamat =

Village in Razavi Khorasan province, Iran

Hasanabad Persian: حسن اباد
- Village
- Location within Iran
- Coordinates: 35°35′25″N 57°57′59″E
- Country: Iran
- Province: Razavi Khorasan
- County: Sheshtamad
- District: Shamkan
- Rural District: Rob-e Shamat

Population (2016)
  - Total: 305
- Time zone: UTC+3:30 (IRST)

Hasanabad (Persian: حسن اباد) (Note: Also romanized as Ḩasanābād; also known as Ḩasanābād-e Sabad (حسن اباد سبد)) is a village in Rob-e Shamat Rural District of Shamkan District in Sheshtamad County, Razavi Khorasan province, Iran.

== Demographics ==
=== Population ===
At the time of the 2006 National Census, the village's population was 350 in 84 households, when it was in the former Sheshtamad District of Sabzevar County. The following census in 2011 counted 432 people in 111 households. The 2016 census measured the population of the village as 305 people in 101 households.

In 2020, the district was separated from the county in the establishment of Sheshtamad County, and the rural district was transferred to the new Shamkan District.
