= Kashk, Sheshtamad =

Village in Razavi Khorasan province, Iran

Kashk Persian: كاشك
- Village
- Location within Iran
- Coordinates: 36°01′28″N 57°45′02″E
- Country: Iran
- Province: Razavi Khorasan
- County: Sheshtamad
- District: Central
- Rural District: Beyhaq

Population (2016)
  - Total: 43
- Time zone: UTC+3:30 (IRST)

Kashk (Persian: كاشك) (Note: Also romanized as Kāshk) is a village in Beyhaq Rural District of the Central District in Sheshtamad County, Razavi Khorasan province, Iran.

== Demographics ==
=== Population ===
The village did not appear in the 2006 and 2011 National Censuses, when it was in the former Sheshtamad District of Sabzevar County. The 2016 census measured the population of the village as 43 people in 13 households.

In 2020, the district was separated from the county in the establishment of Sheshtamad County, and the rural district was transferred to the new Central District.
