= Hasanabad, Beyhaq =

Village in Razavi Khorasan province, Iran

Hasanabad Persian: حسن اباد
- Village
- Location within Iran
- Coordinates: 35°56′47″N 57°48′20″E
- Country: Iran
- Province: Razavi Khorasan
- County: Sheshtamad
- District: Central
- Rural District: Beyhaq

Population (2016)
  - Total: 113
- Time zone: UTC+3:30 (IRST)

Hasanabad (Persian: حسن اباد) (Note: Also romanized as Ḩasanābād; also known as Ḩasanābād-e Deh Zamīn) is a village in Beyhaq Rural District of the Central District in Sheshtamad County, Razavi Khorasan province, Iran.

== Demographics ==
=== Population ===
At the time of the 2006 National Census, the village's population was 127 in 53 households, when it was in the former Sheshtamad District of Sabzevar County. The following census in 2011 counted 134 people in 57 households. The 2016 census measured the population of the village as 113 people in 51 households.

In 2020, the district was separated from the county in the establishment of Sheshtamad County, and the rural district was transferred to the new Central District.
