= Chenar, Sheshtamad =

Village in Razavi Khorasan province, Iran

Chenar Persian: چنار
- Village
- Location within Iran
- Coordinates: 35°34′06″N 58°05′49″E
- Country: Iran
- Province: Razavi Khorasan
- County: Sheshtamad
- District: Shamkan
- Rural District: Rob-e Shamat

Population (2016)
  - Total: 229
- Time zone: UTC+3:30 (IRST)

Chenar (Persian: چنار) (Note: Also romanized as Chenār) is a village in Rob-e Shamat Rural District of Shamkan District in Sheshtamad County, Razavi Khorasan province, Iran.

== Demographics ==
=== Population ===
At the time of the 2006 National Census, the village's population was 203 in 58 households, when it was in the former Sheshtamad District of Sabzevar County. The following census in 2011 counted 213 people in 70 households. The 2016 census measured the population of the village as 229 people in 76 households.

In 2020, the district was separated from the county in the establishment of Sheshtamad County, and the rural district was transferred to the new Shamkan District.
