= Kalateh-ye Tir Kaman =

Village in Razavi Khorasan province, Iran

Kalateh-ye Tir Kaman Persian: كلاته تيركمان
- Village
- Location within Iran
- Coordinates: 35°34′57″N 58°04′12″E
- Country: Iran
- Province: Razavi Khorasan
- County: Sheshtamad
- District: Shamkan
- Rural District: Rob-e Shamat

Population (2016)
  - Total: 632
- Time zone: UTC+3:30 (IRST)

Kalateh-ye Tir Kaman (Persian: كلاته تيركمان) (Note: Also romanized as Kalāteh-ye Tīr Kamān; also known as Kalāteh) is a village in Rob-e Shamat Rural District of Shamkan District in Sheshtamad County, Razavi Khorasan province, Iran.

== Demographics ==
=== Population ===
At the time of the 2006 National Census, the village's population was 580 in 153 households, when it was in the former Sheshtamad District of Sabzevar County. The following census in 2011 counted 588 people in 181 households. The 2016 census measured the population of the village as 632 people in 205 households.

In 2020, the district was separated from the county in the establishment of Sheshtamad County, and the rural district was transferred to the new Shamkan District.
