= Albolagh, Razavi Khorasan =

Village in Razavi Khorasan province, Iran

Albolagh Persian: البلاغ
- Village
- Location within Iran
- Coordinates: 35°38′29″N 57°59′21″E
- Country: Iran
- Province: Razavi Khorasan
- County: Sheshtamad
- District: Shamkan
- Rural District: Rob-e Shamat

Population (2016)
  - Total: 602
- Time zone: UTC+3:30 (IRST)

Albolagh (Persian: البلاغ) (Note: Also romanized as Albolāgh; also known as Albolāg and ‘Alībulāgh) is a village in Rob-e Shamat Rural District of Shamkan District in Sheshtamad County, Razavi Khorasan province, Iran.

== Demographics ==
=== Population ===
At the time of the 2006 National Census, the village's population was 487 in 120 households, when it was in the former Sheshtamad District of Sabzevar County. The following census in 2011 counted 441 people in 121 households. The 2016 census measured the population of the village as 602 people in 184 households.

In 2020, the district was separated from the county in the establishment of Sheshtamad County, and the rural district was transferred to the new Shamkan District.
