= Deh-e Now, Sheshtamad =

Village in Razavi Khorasan province, Iran

Deh-e Now Persian: ده نو
- Village
- Location within Iran
- Coordinates: 35°32′57″N 58°08′39″E
- Country: Iran
- Province: Razavi Khorasan
- County: Sheshtamad
- District: Shamkan
- Rural District: Rob-e Shamat

Population (2016)
  - Total: 649
- Time zone: UTC+3:30 (IRST)

Deh-e Now (Persian: ده نو) (Note: Also romanized as Deh Now) is a village in Rob-e Shamat Rural District of Shamkan District in Sheshtamad County, Razavi Khorasan province, Iran.

== Demographics ==
=== Population ===
At the time of the 2006 National Census, the village's population was 825 in 203 households, when it was in the former Sheshtamad District of Sabzevar County. The following census in 2011 counted 798 people in 231 households. The 2016 census measured the population of the village as 649 people in 178 households, the most populous in its rural district.

In 2020, the district was separated from the county in the establishment of Sheshtamad County, and the rural district was transferred to the new Shamkan District.
