= Yahyaabad, Sheshtamad =

Village in Razavi Khorasan province, Iran

Yahyaabad Persian: يحيي اباد
- Village
- Location within Iran
- Coordinates: 36°02′45″N 58°03′20″E
- Country: Iran
- Province: Razavi Khorasan
- County: Sheshtamad
- District: Shamkan
- Rural District: Shamkan

Population (2016)
  - Total: 839
- Time zone: UTC+3:30 (IRST)

Yahyaabad (Persian: يحيي اباد) (Note: Also romanized as Yaḩyáābād) is a village in Shamkan Rural District of Shamkan District in Sheshtamad County, Razavi Khorasan province, Iran.

== Demographics ==
=== Population ===
At the time of the 2006 National Census, the village's population was 998 in 237 households, when it was in the former Sheshtamad District of Sabzevar County. The following census in 2011 counted 1,051 people in 294 households. The 2016 census measured the population of the village as 839 people in 247 households.

In 2020, the district was separated from the county in the establishment of Sheshtamad County, and the rural district was transferred to the new Shamkan District.
