= Bagh Kheyrat =

Village in Razavi Khorasan province, Iran

Bagh Kheyrat Persian: باغ خيرات
- Village
- Location within Iran
- Coordinates: 35°56′58″N 57°40′11″E
- Country: Iran
- Province: Razavi Khorasan
- County: Sheshtamad
- District: Central
- Rural District: Beyhaq

Population (2016)
  - Total: 213
- Time zone: UTC+3:30 (IRST)

Bagh Kheyrat (Persian: باغ خيرات) (Note: Also romanized as Bāgh Kheyrāt and Bāghkheyrāt) is a village in Beyhaq Rural District of the Central District in Sheshtamad County, Razavi Khorasan province, Iran.

== Demographics ==
=== Population ===
At the time of the 2006 National Census, the village's population was 337 in 111 households, when it was in the former Sheshtamad District of Sabzevar County. The following census in 2011 counted 272 people in 108 households. The 2016 census measured the population of the village as 213 people in 87 households.

In 2020, the district was separated from the county in the establishment of Sheshtamad County, and the rural district was transferred to the new Central District.
