= Beyzakh =

Village in Razavi Khorasan province, Iran

Beyzakh Persian: بيزخ
- Village
- Location within Iran
- Coordinates: 35°55′25″N 57°40′41″E
- Country: Iran
- Province: Razavi Khorasan
- County: Sheshtamad
- District: Central
- Rural District: Beyhaq

Population (2016)
  - Total: 125
- Time zone: UTC+3:30 (IRST)

Beyzakh (Persian: بيزخ) is a village in Beyhaq Rural District of the Central District in Sheshtamad County, Razavi Khorasan province, Iran.

== Demographics ==
=== Population ===
At the time of the 2006 National Census, the village's population was 313 in 89 households, when it was in the former Sheshtamad District of Sabzevar County. The following census in 2011 counted 256 people in 85 households. The 2016 census measured the population of the village as 125 people in 43 households.

In 2020, the district was separated from the county in the establishment of Sheshtamad County, and the rural district was transferred to the new Central District.
