= Gach =

Village in Razavi Khorasan province, Iran

Gach Persian: گاچ
- Village
- Location within Iran
- Coordinates: 35°55′30″N 57°41′57″E
- Country: Iran
- Province: Razavi Khorasan
- County: Sheshtamad
- District: Central
- Rural District: Beyhaq

Population (2016)
  - Total: 648
- Time zone: UTC+3:30 (IRST)

Gach (Persian: گاچ) (Note: Also romanized as Gāch; also known as Kāj and Kaj) is a village in Beyhaq Rural District of the Central District in Sheshtamad County, Razavi Khorasan province, Iran.

== Demographics ==
=== Population ===
At the time of the 2006 National Census, the village's population was 294 in 103 households, when it was in the former Sheshtamad District of Sabzevar County. The following census in 2011 counted 246 people in 91 households. The 2016 census measured the population of the village as 648 people in 179 households.

In 2020, the district was separated from the county in the establishment of Sheshtamad County, and the rural district was transferred to the new Central District.
