= Kalateh-ye Sadat, Razavi Khorasan =

Village in Razavi Khorasan province, Iran

Kalateh-ye Sadat Persian: كلاته سادات
- Village
- Location within Iran
- Coordinates: 36°00′38″N 57°42′17″E
- Country: Iran
- Province: Razavi Khorasan
- County: Sheshtamad
- District: Central
- Rural District: Beyhaq

Population (2016)
  - Total: 252
- Time zone: UTC+3:30 (IRST)

Kalateh-ye Sadat (Persian: كلاته سادات) (Note: Also romanized as Kalāteh-ye Sādāt) is a village in Beyhaq Rural District of the Central District in Sheshtamad County, Razavi Khorasan province, Iran.

== Demographics ==
=== Population ===
At the time of the 2006 National Census, the village's population was 272 in 81 households, when it was in the former Sheshtamad District of Sabzevar County. The following census in 2011 counted 238 people in 78 households. The 2016 census measured the population of the village as 252 people in 80 households.

In 2020, the district was separated from the county in the establishment of Sheshtamad County, and the rural district was transferred to the new Central District.
