= Beyrut, Iran =

Village in Razavi Khorasan province, Iran

Beyrut Persian: بيروت
- Village
- Location within Iran
- Coordinates: 35°42′07″N 58°08′53″E
- Country: Iran
- Province: Razavi Khorasan
- County: Sheshtamad
- District: Shamkan
- Rural District: Rob-e Shamat

Population (2016)
  - Total: 468
- Time zone: UTC+3:30 (IRST)

Beyrut (Persian: بيروت) (Note: Also romanized as Beyrūt) is a village in Rob-e Shamat Rural District of Shamkan District in Sheshtamad County, Razavi Khorasan province, Iran.

== Demographics ==
=== Population ===
At the time of the 2006 National Census, the village's population was 592 in 150 households, when it was in the former Sheshtamad District of Sabzevar County. The following census in 2011 counted 614 people in 167 households. The 2016 census measured the population of the village as 468 people in 141 households.

In 2020, the district was separated from the county in the establishment of Sheshtamad County, and the rural district was transferred to the new Shamkan District.
