= Kharasf =

Village in Razavi Khorasan province, Iran

Kharasf Persian: خرسف
- Village
- Location within Iran
- Coordinates: 35°39′56″N 58°11′34″E
- Country: Iran
- Province: Razavi Khorasan
- County: Sheshtamad
- District: Shamkan
- Rural District: Rob-e Shamat

Population (2016)
  - Total: 565
- Time zone: UTC+3:30 (IRST)

Kharasf (Persian: خرسف) is a village in Rob-e Shamat Rural District of Shamkan District in Sheshtamad County, Razavi Khorasan province, Iran.

== Demographics ==
=== Population ===
At the time of the 2006 National Census, the village's population was 609 in 150 households, when it was in the former Sheshtamad District of Sabzevar County. The following census in 2011 counted 665 people in 195 households. The 2016 census measured the population of the village as 565 people in 187 households.

In 2020, the district was separated from the county in the establishment of Sheshtamad County, and the rural district was transferred to the new Shamkan District.
