= Sabbeh =

Village in Razavi Khorasan province, Iran

Sabbeh Persian: سبه
- Village
- Location within Iran
- Coordinates: 35°34′36″N 57°57′58″E
- Country: Iran
- Province: Razavi Khorasan
- County: Sheshtamad
- District: Shamkan
- Rural District: Rob-e Shamat

Population (2016)
  - Total: 390
- Time zone: UTC+3:30 (IRST)

Sabbeh (Persian: سبه) (Note: Also romanized as Sabeh; also known as Sibi) is a village in Rob-e Shamat Rural District of Shamkan District in Sheshtamad County, Razavi Khorasan province, Iran.

== Demographics ==
=== Population ===
At the time of the 2006 National Census, the village's population was 409 in 99 households, when it was in the former Sheshtamad District of Sabzevar County. The following census in 2011 counted 405 people in 112 households. The 2016 census measured the population of the village as 390 people in 119 households.

In 2020, the district was separated from the county in the establishment of Sheshtamad County, and the rural district was transferred to the new Shamkan District.
