= Tondok =

Village in Razavi Khorasan province, Iran

Tondok Persian: تندك
- Village
- Location within Iran
- Coordinates: 35°48′44″N 57°46′43″E
- Country: Iran
- Province: Razavi Khorasan
- County: Sheshtamad
- District: Central
- Rural District: Takab-e Kuhmish

Population (2016)
  - Total: 1,434
- Time zone: UTC+3:30 (IRST)

Tondok (Persian: تندك) (Note: Also romanized as Tandok; also known as Tondūk) is a village in, and the capital of, Takab-e Kuhmish Rural District in the Central District of Sheshtamad County, Razavi Khorasan province, Iran.

== Demographics ==
=== Population ===
At the time of the 2006 National Census, the village's population was 1,469 in 431 households, when it was in the former Sheshtamad District of Sabzevar County. The following census in 2011 counted 1,469 people in 502 households. The 2016 census measured the population of the village as 1,434 people in 498 households, the most populous in its rural district.

In 2020, the district was separated from the county in the establishment of Sheshtamad County, and the rural district was transferred to the new Central District.
