= Mej, Sheshtamad =

Village in Razavi Khorasan province, Iran

Mej Persian: مج
- Village
- Location within Iran
- Coordinates: 35°46′05″N 57°51′42″E
- Country: Iran
- Province: Razavi Khorasan
- County: Sheshtamad
- District: Central
- Rural District: Takab-e Kuhmish

Population (2016)
  - Total: 1,211
- Time zone: UTC+3:30 (IRST)

Mej (Persian: مج) is a village in Takab-e Kuhmish Rural District of the Central District in Sheshtamad County, Razavi Khorasan province, Iran.

== Demographics ==
=== Population ===
At the time of the 2006 National Census, the village's population was 1,451 in 378 households, when it was in the former Sheshtamad District of Sabzevar County. The following census in 2011 counted 1,490 people in 435 households. The 2016 census measured the population of the village as 1,211 people in 402 households.

In 2020, the district was separated from the county in the establishment of Sheshtamad County, and the rural district was transferred to the new Central District.
