= Sudabad =

Village in Razavi Khorasan province, Iran

Sudabad Persian: سوداباد
- Village
- Location within Iran
- Coordinates: 36°01′27″N 57°44′39″E
- Country: Iran
- Province: Razavi Khorasan
- County: Sheshtamad
- District: Central
- Rural District: Beyhaq

Population (2016)
  - Total: 54
- Time zone: UTC+3:30 (IRST)

Sudabad (Persian: سوداباد) (Note: Also romanized as Sūdābād) is a village in Beyhaq Rural District of the Central District in Sheshtamad County, Razavi Khorasan province, Iran.

== Demographics ==
=== Population ===
The village did not appear in the 2006 and 2011 National Censuses, when it was in the former Sheshtamad District of Sabzevar County. The 2016 census measured the population of the village as 54 people in 16 households.

In 2020, the district was separated from the county in the establishment of Sheshtamad County, and the rural district was transferred to the new Central District.
