= Now Bahar, Sheshtamad =

Village in Razavi Khorasan province, Iran

Now Bahar Persian: نوبهار
- Village
- Location within Iran
- Coordinates: 35°57′47″N 58°08′58″E
- Country: Iran
- Province: Razavi Khorasan
- County: Sheshtamad
- District: Shamkan
- Rural District: Shamkan

Population (2016)
  - Total: 352
- Time zone: UTC+3:30 (IRST)

Now Bahar (Persian: نوبهار) (Note: Also romanized as Now Bahār; also known as Naubahār) is a village in Shamkan Rural District of Shamkan District in Sheshtamad County, Razavi Khorasan province, Iran.

== Demographics ==
=== Population ===
At the time of the 2006 National Census, the village's population was 393 in 84 households, when it was in the former Sheshtamad District of Sabzevar County. The following census in 2011 counted 395 people in 105 households. The 2016 census measured the population of the village as 352 people in 111 households.

In 2020, the district was separated from the county in the establishment of Sheshtamad County, and the rural district was transferred to the new Shamkan District.
