= Pa Dar =

Village in Razavi Khorasan province, Iran

Pa Dar Persian: پادر
- Village
- Location within Iran
- Coordinates: 35°53′17″N 57°46′06″E
- Country: Iran
- Province: Razavi Khorasan
- County: Sheshtamad
- District: Central
- Rural District: Beyhaq

Population (2016)
  - Total: 106
- Time zone: UTC+3:30 (IRST)

Pa Dar (Persian: پادر) (Note: Also romanized as Pā Dar and Pādar) is a village in Beyhaq Rural District of the Central District in Sheshtamad County, Razavi Khorasan province, Iran.

== Demographics ==
=== Population ===
At the time of the 2006 National Census, the village's population was 175 in 72 households, when it was in the former Sheshtamad District of Sabzevar County. The following census in 2011 counted 237 people in 103 households. The 2016 census measured the population of the village as 106 people in 47 households.

In 2020, the district was separated from the county in the establishment of Sheshtamad County, and the rural district was transferred to the new Central District.
