= Sanjerd =

Village in Razavi Khorasan province, Iran

Sanjerd Persian: سنجرد
- Village
- Location within Iran
- Coordinates: 35°47′43″N 58°08′22″E
- Country: Iran
- Province: Razavi Khorasan
- County: Sheshtamad
- District: Shamkan
- Rural District: Shamkan

Population (2016)
  - Total: 631
- Time zone: UTC+3:30 (IRST)

Sanjerd (Persian: سنجرد) is a village in Shamkan Rural District of Shamkan District in Sheshtamad County, Razavi Khorasan province, Iran.

== Demographics ==
=== Population ===
At the time of the 2006 National Census, the village's population was 575 in 139 households, when it was in the former Sheshtamad District of Sabzevar County. The following census in 2011 counted 634 people in 174 households. The 2016 census measured the population of the village as 631 people in 169 households.

In 2020, the district was separated from the county in the establishment of Sheshtamad County, and the rural district was transferred to the new Shamkan District.
