= Halakabad =

Village in Razavi Khorasan province, Iran

Halakabad Persian: هلاك اباد
- Village
- Location within Iran
- Coordinates: 35°58′42″N 57°35′27″E
- Country: Iran
- Province: Razavi Khorasan
- County: Sheshtamad
- District: Central
- Rural District: Beyhaq

Population (2016)
  - Total: 97
- Time zone: UTC+3:30 (IRST)

Halakabad (Persian: هلاك اباد) (Note: Also romanized as Halākābād) is a village in Beyhaq Rural District of the Central District in Sheshtamad County, Razavi Khorasan province, Iran.

== Demographics ==
=== Population ===
At the time of the 2006 National Census, the village's population was 133 in 46 households, when it was in the former Sheshtamad District of Sabzevar County. The following census in 2011 counted 129 people in 49 households. The 2016 census measured the population of the village as 97 people in 40 households.

In 2020, the district was separated from the county in the establishment of Sheshtamad County, and the rural district was transferred to the new Central District.
