= Aliabad-e Tarkan =

Village in Razavi Khorasan province, Iran

Aliabad-e Tarkan Persian: علي ابادتركن
- Village
- Location within Iran
- Coordinates: 36°00′25″N 58°09′10″E
- Country: Iran
- Province: Razavi Khorasan
- County: Sheshtamad
- District: Shamkan
- Rural District: Shamkan

Population (2016)
  - Total: 148
- Time zone: UTC+3:30 (IRST)

Aliabad-e Tarkan (Persian: علي ابادتركن) (Note: Also romanized as ‘Alīābād-e Tarḵan; also known as ‘Alīābād) is a village in Shamkan Rural District of Shamkan District in Sheshtamad County, Razavi Khorasan province, Iran.

== Demographics ==
=== Population ===
At the time of the 2006 National Census, the village's population was 139 in 38 households, when it was in the former Sheshtamad District of Sabzevar County. The following census in 2011 counted 145 people in 49 households. The 2016 census measured the population of the village as 148 people in 46 households.

In 2020, the district was separated from the county in the establishment of Sheshtamad County, and the rural district was transferred to the new Shamkan District.
