= Sar Rud, Sheshtamad =

Village in Razavi Khorasan province, Iran

Sar Rud Persian: سررود
- Village
- Location within Iran
- Coordinates: 35°53′16″N 57°49′09″E
- Country: Iran
- Province: Razavi Khorasan
- County: Sheshtamad
- District: Central
- Rural District: Beyhaq

Population (2016)
  - Total: 56
- Time zone: UTC+3:30 (IRST)

Sar Rud (Persian: سررود) (Note: Also romanized as Sar Rūd) is a village in Beyhaq Rural District of the Central District in Sheshtamad County, Razavi Khorasan province, Iran.

== Demographics ==
=== Population ===
At the time of the 2006 National Census, the village's population was 80 in 30 households, when it was in the former Sheshtamad District of Sabzevar County. The following census in 2011 counted 93 people in 39 households. The 2016 census measured the population of the village as 56 people in 26 households.

In 2020, the district was separated from the county in the establishment of Sheshtamad County, and the rural district was transferred to the new Central District.
