= Bad Ashian =

Village in Razavi Khorasan province, Iran

Bad Ashian Persian: باداشيان
- Village
- Location within Iran
- Coordinates: 35°55′54″N 57°38′20″E
- Country: Iran
- Province: Razavi Khorasan
- County: Sheshtamad
- District: Central
- Rural District: Beyhaq

Population (2016)
  - Total: 162
- Time zone: UTC+3:30 (IRST)

Bad Ashian (Persian: باداشيان) (Note: Also romanized as Bād Āshīān) is a village in Beyhaq Rural District of the Central District in Sheshtamad County, Razavi Khorasan province, Iran.

== Demographics ==
=== Population ===
At the time of the 2006 National Census, the village's population was 251 in 94 households, when it was in the former Sheshtamad District of Sabzevar County. The following census in 2011 counted 323 people in 123 households. The 2016 census measured the population of the village as 162 people in 82 households.

In 2020, the district was separated from the county in the establishment of Sheshtamad County, and the rural district was transferred to the new Central District.
