= Mehrshani =

Village in Razavi Khorasan province, Iran

Mehrshani Persian: مهرنشاني
- Village
- Location within Iran
- Coordinates: 35°53′20″N 57°56′39″E
- Country: Iran
- Province: Razavi Khorasan
- County: Sheshtamad
- District: Central
- Rural District: Takab-e Kuhmish

Population (2016)
  - Total: 310
- Time zone: UTC+3:30 (IRST)

Mehrshani (Persian: مهرنشاني) (Note: Also romanized as Mehrshānī; also known as Mehr Shāhī (مهرشاهي)) is a village in Takab-e Kuhmish Rural District of the Central District in Sheshtamad County, Razavi Khorasan province, Iran.

== Demographics ==
=== Population ===
At the time of the 2006 National Census, the village's population was 285 in 69 households, when it was in the former Sheshtamad District of Sabzevar County. The following census in 2011 counted 318 people in 86 households. The 2016 census measured the population of the village as 310 people in 101 households.

In 2020, the district was separated from the county in the establishment of Sheshtamad County, and the rural district was transferred to the new Central District.
