= Jonbaz =

Village in Razavi Khorasan province, Iran

Jonbaz Persian: جنبذ
- Village
- Location within Iran
- Coordinates: 35°52′38″N 57°49′51″E
- Country: Iran
- Province: Razavi Khorasan
- County: Sheshtamad
- District: Central
- Rural District: Beyhaq

Population (2016)
  - Total: 315
- Time zone: UTC+3:30 (IRST)

Jonbaz (Persian: جنبذ) (Note: Also romanized as Jonbaz̄) is a village in Beyhaq Rural District of the Central District in Sheshtamad County, Razavi Khorasan province, Iran.

== Demographics ==
=== Population ===
At the time of the 2006 National Census, the village's population was 372 in 98 households, when it was in the former Sheshtamad District of Sabzevar County. The following census in 2011 counted 353 people in 108 households. The 2016 census measured the population of the village as 315 people in 98 households.

In 2020, the district was separated from the county in the establishment of Sheshtamad County, and the rural district was transferred to the new Central District.
