= Qaleh Meydan, Razavi Khorasan =

Village in Razavi Khorasan province, Iran

Qaleh Meydan Persian: قلعه ميدان
- Village
- Location within Iran
- Coordinates: 35°39′47″N 58°06′30″E
- Country: Iran
- Province: Razavi Khorasan
- County: Sheshtamad
- District: Shamkan
- Rural District: Rob-e Shamat

Population (2016)
  - Total: 340
- Time zone: UTC+3:30 (IRST)

Qaleh Meydan (Persian: قلعه ميدان) (Note: Also romanized as Qal‘eh Meydān, Qal‘eh-i-Maidān, Qal‘eh-ye Meydān, and Qallah-i-Maidān) is a village in, and the capital of, Rob-e Shamat Rural District in Shamkan District of Sheshtamad County, Razavi Khorasan province, Iran.

== Demographics ==
=== Population ===
At the time of the 2006 National Census, the village's population was 391 in 103 households, when it was in the former Sheshtamad District of Sabzevar County. The following census in 2011 counted 401 people in 114 households. The 2016 census measured the population of the village as 340 people in 113 households.

In 2020, the district was separated from the county in e establishment of Sheshtamad County, and the rural district was transferred to the new Shamkan District.
