= Chah Sukhteh =

Village in Razavi Khorasan province, Iran

Chah Sukhteh Persian: چاه سوخته
- Village
- Location within Iran
- Coordinates: 35°48′02″N 57°59′36″E
- Country: Iran
- Province: Razavi Khorasan
- County: Sheshtamad
- District: Central
- Rural District: Takab-e Kuhmish

Population (2016)
  - Total: 241
- Time zone: UTC+3:30 (IRST)

Chah Sukhteh (Persian: چاه سوخته) (Note: Also romanized as Chāh Sūkhteh) is a village in Takab-e Kuhmish Rural District of the Central District in Sheshtamad County, Razavi Khorasan province, Iran.

== Demographics ==
=== Population ===
At the time of the 2006 National Census, the village's population was 41 in nine households, when it was in the former Sheshtamad District of Sabzevar County. The following census in 2011 counted 96 people in 30 households. The 2016 census measured the population of the village as 241 people in 67 households.

In 2020, the district was separated from the county in the establishment of Sheshtamad County, and the rural district was transferred to the new Central District.
