= Rowshanabad, Razavi Khorasan =

Village in Razavi Khorasan province, Iran

Rowshanabad Persian: روشن اباد
- Village
- Location within Iran
- Coordinates: 35°39′40″N 58°06′08″E
- Country: Iran
- Province: Razavi Khorasan
- County: Sheshtamad
- District: Shamkan
- Rural District: Rob-e Shamat

Population (2016)
  - Total: 205
- Time zone: UTC+3:30 (IRST)

Rowshanabad (Persian: روشن اباد) (Note: Also romanized as Rowshanābād) is a village in Rob-e Shamat Rural District of Shamkan District in Sheshtamad County, Razavi Khorasan province, Iran.

== Demographics ==
=== Population ===
At the time of the 2006 National Census, the village's population was 213 in 56 households, when it was in the former Sheshtamad District of Sabzevar County. The following census in 2011 counted 244 people in 72 households. The 2016 census measured the population of the village as 205 people in 72 households.

In 2020, the district was separated from the county in the establishment of Sheshtamad County, and the rural district was transferred to the new Shamkan District.
