= Kalateh-ye Now Bahar =

Village in Razavi Khorasan province, Iran

Kalateh-ye Now Bahar Persian: كلاته نوبهار
- Village
- Location within Iran
- Coordinates: 35°56′53″N 58°09′53″E
- Country: Iran
- Province: Razavi Khorasan
- County: Sheshtamad
- District: Shamkan
- Rural District: Shamkan

Population (2016)
  - Total: 873
- Time zone: UTC+3:30 (IRST)

Kalateh-ye Now Bahar (Persian: كلاته نوبهار) (Note: Also romanized as Kalāteh-ye Now Bahār) is a village in Shamkan Rural District of Shamkan District in Sheshtamad County, Razavi Khorasan province, Iran.

== Demographics ==
=== Population ===
At the time of the 2006 National Census, the village's population was 779 in 198 households, when it was in the former Sheshtamad District of Sabzevar County. The following census in 2011 counted 882 people in 270 households. The 2016 census measured the population of the village as 873 people in 276 households.

In 2020, the district was separated from the county in the establishment of Sheshtamad County, and the rural district was transferred to the new Shamkan District.
