= Azizabad, Sheshtamad =

Village in Razavi Khorasan province, Iran

Azizabad Persian: عزيزاباد
- Village
- Location within Iran
- Coordinates: 35°54′50″N 57°50′20″E
- Country: Iran
- Province: Razavi Khorasan
- County: Sheshtamad
- District: Central
- Rural District: Beyhaq

Population (2016)
  - Total: 447
- Time zone: UTC+3:30 (IRST)

Azizabad (Persian: عزيزاباد) (Note: Also romanized as ‘Azīzābād) is a village in Beyhaq Rural District of the Central District in Sheshtamad County, Razavi Khorasan province, Iran.

== Demographics ==
=== Population ===
At the time of the 2006 National Census, the village's population was 515 in 149 households, when it was in the former Sheshtamad District of Sabzevar County. The following census in 2011 counted 482 people in 157 households. The 2016 census measured the population of the village as 447 people in 168 households.

In 2020, the district was separated from the county in the establishment of Sheshtamad County, and the rural district was transferred to the new Central District.
