= Aliabad-e Seyyed Rahim =

Village in Razavi Khorasan province, Iran

Aliabad-e Seyyed Rahim Persian: علي ابادسيدرحيم
- Village
- Location within Iran
- Coordinates: 35°57′52″N 57°49′25″E
- Country: Iran
- Province: Razavi Khorasan
- County: Sheshtamad
- District: Central
- Rural District: Beyhaq

Population (2016)
  - Total: 206
- Time zone: UTC+3:30 (IRST)

Aliabad-e Seyyed Rahim (Persian: علي ابادسيدرحيم) (Note: Also romanized as ‘Alīābād-e Seyyed Raḩīm) is a village in Beyhaq Rural District of the Central District in Sheshtamad County, Razavi Khorasan province, Iran.

== Demographics ==
=== Population ===
At the time of the 2006 National Census, the village's population was 270 in 94 households, when it was in the former Sheshtamad District of Sabzevar County. The following census in 2011 counted 264 people in 104 households. The 2016 census measured the population of the village as 206 people in 89 households.

In 2020, the district was separated from the county in the establishment of Sheshtamad County, and the rural district was transferred to the new Central District.
