= Keyzur =

Village in Razavi Khorasan province, Iran

Keyzur Persian: كيذور
- Village
- Location within Iran
- Coordinates: 36°00′04″N 57°39′45″E
- Country: Iran
- Province: Razavi Khorasan
- County: Sheshtamad
- District: Central
- Rural District: Beyhaq

Population (2016)
  - Total: 1,222
- Time zone: UTC+3:30 (IRST)

Keyzur (Persian: كيذور) (Note: Also romanized as Kaizur and Keyz̄ūr; also known as Keydūz and Qal‘eh Sefīd) is a village in Beyhaq Rural District of the Central District in Sheshtamad County, Razavi Khorasan province, Iran.

== Demographics ==
=== Population ===
At the time of the 2006 National Census, the village's population was 1,241 in 348 households, when it was in the former Sheshtamad District of Sabzevar County. The following census in 2011 counted 1,266 people in 412 households. The 2016 census measured the population of the village as 1,222 people in 392 households, the most populous in its rural district.

In 2020, the district was separated from the county in the establishment of Sheshtamad County, and the rural district was transferred to the new Central District.
