= Shahr Sukhteh =

Village in Razavi Khorasan province, Iran

Shahr Sukhteh Persian: شهرسوخته
- Village
- Location within Iran
- Coordinates: 35°49′16″N 58°00′16″E
- Country: Iran
- Province: Razavi Khorasan
- County: Sheshtamad
- District: Central
- Rural District: Takab-e Kuhmish

Population (2016)
  - Total: 232
- Time zone: UTC+3:30 (IRST)

Shahr Sukhteh (Persian: شهرسوخته) (Note: Also romanized as Shahr Sūkhteh; also known as Chehr-e Sūkhteh) is a village in Takab-e Kuhmish Rural District of the Central District in Sheshtamad County, Razavi Khorasan province, Iran.

== Demographics ==
=== Population ===
At the time of the 2006 National Census, the village's population was 65 in 21 households, when it was in the former Sheshtamad District of Sabzevar County. The following census in 2011 counted 104 people in 28 households. The 2016 census measured the population of the village as 232 people in 66 households.

In 2020, the district was separated from the county in the establishment of Sheshtamad County, and the rural district was transferred to the new Central District.
