= Divaneh Khuy =

Village in Razavi Khorasan province, Iran

Divaneh Khuy Persian: ديوان خوي
- Village
- Location within Iran
- Coordinates: 35°54′31″N 57°41′06″E
- Country: Iran
- Province: Razavi Khorasan
- County: Sheshtamad
- District: Central
- Rural District: Beyhaq

Population (2016)
  - Total: 154
- Time zone: UTC+3:30 (IRST)

Divaneh Khuy (Persian: ديوان خوي) (Note: Also romanized as Dīvāneh Khūy; also known as Divaneh Khvoy and Dīvāneh Khvoy) is a village in Beyhaq Rural District of the Central District in Sheshtamad County, Razavi Khorasan province, Iran.

== Demographics ==
=== Population ===
At the time of the 2006 National Census, the village's population was 157 in 47 households, when it was in the former Sheshtamad District of Sabzevar County. The following census in 2011 counted 118 people in 50 households. The 2016 census measured the population of the village as 154 people in 49 households.

In 2020, the district was separated from the county in the establishment of Sheshtamad County, and the rural district was transferred to the new Central District.
