= Bojdan, Sheshtamad =

Village in Razavi Khorasan province, Iran

Bojdan Persian: بجدن
- Village
- Location within Iran
- Coordinates: 35°56′11″N 57°52′13″E
- Country: Iran
- Province: Razavi Khorasan
- County: Sheshtamad
- District: Central
- Rural District: Beyhaq

Population (2016)
  - Total: 638
- Time zone: UTC+3:30 (IRST)

Bojdan (Persian: بجدن) (Note: Also known as Bojdān Kūchek, Bojdan-e-Kūchak, and Bozhdan (بژدن)) is a village in Beyhaq Rural District of the Central District in Sheshtamad County, Razavi Khorasan province, Iran.

== Demographics ==
=== Population ===
At the time of the 2006 National Census, the village's population was 711 in 189 households, when it was in the former Sheshtamad District of Sabzevar County. The following census in 2011 counted 684 people in 207 households. The 2016 census measured the population of the village as 638 people in 196 households.

In 2020, the district was separated from the county in the establishment of Sheshtamad County, and the rural district was transferred to the new Central District.
