= Parvand =

Parvand (Persian: پروند) may refer to:

- Parvand, Kerman
- Parvand, Razavi Khorasan
- Parvand, West Azerbaijan
