= Kalavashk, Sheshtamad =

Village in Razavi Khorasan province, Iran

Kalavashk Persian: كلاوشك
- Village
- Location within Iran
- Coordinates: 36°02′32″N 57°46′38″E
- Country: Iran
- Province: Razavi Khorasan
- County: Sheshtamad
- District: Central
- Rural District: Beyhaq

Population (2016)
  - Total: 146
- Time zone: UTC+3:30 (IRST)

Kalavashk (Persian: كلاوشك) (Note: Also romanized as Kalāvashk and Kalāveshk; also known as Jaghatāi, Kalāveshk-e Kūchak, Kalāveshk-e Kūchek, and Kalāyeshk) is a village in Beyhaq Rural District of the Central District in Sheshtamad County, Razavi Khorasan province, Iran.

== Demographics ==
=== Population ===
At the time of the 2006 National Census, the village's population was 68 in 19 households, when it was in the former Sheshtamad District of Sabzevar County. The following census in 2011 counted 81 people in 21 households. The 2016 census measured the population of the village as 146 people in 46 households.

In 2020, the district was separated from the county in the establishment of Sheshtamad County, and the rural district was transferred to the new Central District.
