= Tazraq, Iran =

Village in Razavi Khorasan province, Iran

Tazraq Persian: طزرق
- Village
- Location within Iran
- Coordinates: 35°59′32″N 57°42′16″E
- Country: Iran
- Province: Razavi Khorasan
- County: Sheshtamad
- District: Central
- Rural District: Beyhaq

Population (2016)
  - Total: 89
- Time zone: UTC+3:30 (IRST)

Tazraq (Persian: طزرق) (Note: Also romanized as Ţazarq; also known as Ţarzaq) is a village in Beyhaq Rural District of the Central District in Sheshtamad County, Razavi Khorasan province, Iran.

== Demographics ==
=== Population ===
At the time of the 2006 National Census, the village's population was 107 in 45 households, when it was in the former Sheshtamad District of Sabzevar County. The following census in 2011 counted 212 people in 79 households. The 2016 census measured the population of the village as 89 people in 35 households.

In 2020, the district was separated from the county in the establishment of Sheshtamad County, and the rural district was transferred to the new Central District.
