= Dalbar Malek Baqar =

Dalbar Malek Baqar دلبرملك باقر
- Village
- Country: Iran
- Province: Razavi Khorasan
- County: Sabzevar
- Bakhsh: Rud Ab
- Rural District: Khavashod

Population (2006)
  - Total: 10
- Time zone: UTC+3:30 (IRST)
  - Summer (DST): UTC+4:30 (IRDT)

Dalbar Malek Baqar (Persian: دلبرملك باقر, also Romanized as Dalbar Maleḵ Bāqar) is a village in Khavashod Rural District, Rud Ab District, Sabzevar County, Razavi Khorasan Province, Iran. At the 2006 census, its population was 10, in 4 families.
