= Homeyreh, Razavi Khorasan =

Homeyreh حميره
- Village
- Location within Iran
- Coordinates: 35°47′11″N 57°08′51″E
- Country: Iran
- Province: Razavi Khorasan
- County: Sabzevar
- Bakhsh: Rud Ab
- Rural District: Kuh Hamayi

Population (2006)
  - Total: 28
- Time zone: UTC+3:30 (IRST)
  - Summer (DST): UTC+4:30 (IRDT)

Homeyreh (Persian: حميره, also Romanized as Ḩomeyreh and Ḩamīreh) is a village in Kuh Hamayi Rural District, Rud Ab District, Sabzevar County, Razavi Khorasan Province, Iran. At the 2006 census, its population was 28, in 6 families.
