= Shamsabad, Sabzevar =

Village in Razavi Khorasan province, Iran

Shamsabad Persian: شمس اباد
- Village
- Location within Iran
- Coordinates: 36°03′24″N 57°16′54″E
- Country: Iran
- Province: Razavi Khorasan
- County: Sabzevar
- District: Rud Ab
- Rural District: Frughan

Population (2016)
  - Total: 547
- Time zone: UTC+3:30 (IRST)

Shamsabad (Persian: شمس اباد) (Note: Also romanized as Shamsābād; also known as Māflū) is a village in Frughan Rural District of Rud Ab District in Sabzevar County, Razavi Khorasan province, Iran.

== Demographics ==
=== Population ===
At the time of the 2006 National Census, the village's population was 600 in 180 households. The following census in 2011 counted 633 people in 216 households. The 2016 census measured the population of the village as 547 people in 201 households.
