= Estaj, Sabzevar =

Village in Razavi Khorasan province, Iran

Estaj Persian: استاج
- Village
- Location within Iran
- Coordinates: 35°55′03″N 57°36′39″E
- Country: Iran
- Province: Razavi Khorasan
- County: Sabzevar
- District: Rud Ab
- Rural District: Khvashod

Population (2016)
  - Total: 267
- Time zone: UTC+3:30 (IRST)

Estaj (Persian: استاج) (Note: Also romanized as Estāj; also known as Estāch and Usmaj) is a village in Khvashod Rural District of Rud Ab District in Sabzevar County, Razavi Khorasan province, Iran.

== Demographics ==
=== Population ===
At the time of the 2006 National Census, the village's population was 267 in 121 households. The following census in 2011 counted 217 people in 114 households. The 2016 census measured the population of the village as 237 people in 111 households.
