= Ban Qan =

Village in Razavi Khorasan province, Iran

Ban Qan Persian: بنقن
- Village
- Location within Iran
- Coordinates: 35°53′34″N 57°33′10″E
- Country: Iran
- Province: Razavi Khorasan
- County: Sabzevar
- District: Rud Ab
- Rural District: Khvashod

Population (2016)
  - Total: 201
- Time zone: UTC+3:30 (IRST)

Ban Qan (Persian: بنقن) (Note: Also known as Ban Ghan) is a village in Khvashod Rural District of Rud Ab District in Sabzevar County, Razavi Khorasan province, Iran.

== Demographics ==
=== Population ===
At the time of the 2006 National Census, the village's population was 398 in 108 households. The following census in 2011 counted 320 people in 110 households. The 2016 census measured the population of the village as 201 people in 77 households.
