= Tasband =

Village in Razavi Khorasan province, Iran

Tasband Persian: تسبند
- Village
- Location within Iran
- Coordinates: 35°56′45″N 57°14′59″E
- Country: Iran
- Province: Razavi Khorasan
- County: Sabzevar
- District: Rud Ab
- Rural District: Frughan

Population (2016)
  - Total: 126
- Time zone: UTC+3:30 (IRST)

Tasband (Persian: تسبند) is a village in Frughan Rural District of Rud Ab District in Sabzevar County, Razavi Khorasan province, Iran.

== Demographics ==
=== Population ===
At the time of the 2006 National Census, the village's population was 158 in 40 households. The following census in 2011 counted 142 people in 42 households. The 2016 census measured the population of the village as 126 people in 41 households.
