= Doruk =

Doruk (Persian: دروك) may refer to:

- Doruk (name)
- Doruk, Iran
- Doruk.net
- Doruk, Bismil
