= Bojdan =

Bojdan (Persian: بجدن) may refer to:

- Bojdan, Rud Ab
- Bojdan, Sheshtomad
