= Poshteh Abbas =

Village in Razavi Khorasan province, Iran

Poshteh Abbas Persian: پشته عباس
- Village
- Location within Iran
- Coordinates: 35°59′56″N 57°04′48″E
- Country: Iran
- Province: Razavi Khorasan
- County: Sabzevar
- District: Rud Ab
- Rural District: Frughan

Population (2016)
  - Total: 0
- Time zone: UTC+3:30 (IRST)

Poshteh Abbas (Persian: پشته عباس) (Note: Also romanized as Poshteh ‘Abbās) is a village in Frughan Rural District of Rud Ab District in Sabzevar County, Razavi Khorasan province, Iran.

== Demographics ==
=== Population ===
At the time of the 2006 National Census, the village's population was 34 in six households. The following census in 2011 counted 29 people in 10 households. The 2016 census measured the population of the village as zero.
