= Zu ol Farrokh =

Village in Razavi Khorasan province, Iran

Zu ol Farrokh Persian: ذوالفرخ
- Village
- Location within Iran
- Coordinates: 35°37′06″N 57°10′50″E
- Country: Iran
- Province: Razavi Khorasan
- County: Sabzevar
- District: Rud Ab
- Rural District: Kuh Hamayi

Population (2016)
  - Total: 83
- Time zone: UTC+3:30 (IRST)

Zu ol Farrokh (Persian: ذوالفرخ) (Note: Also romanized as Z̄ū ol Farrokh) is a village in Kuh Hamayi Rural District of Rud Ab District in Sabzevar County, Razavi Khorasan province, Iran.

== Demographics ==
=== Population ===
At the time of the 2006 National Census, the village's population was 128 in 30 households. The following census in 2011 counted 94 people in 23 households. The 2016 census measured the population of the village as 83 people in 27 households.
