= Khvosh Mardan =

Village in Razavi Khorasan province, Iran

Khvosh Mardan Persian: خوشمردان
- Village
- Location within Iran
- Coordinates: 35°52′05″N 57°37′44″E
- Country: Iran
- Province: Razavi Khorasan
- County: Sabzevar
- District: Rud Ab
- Rural District: Khvashod

Population (2016)
  - Total: 296
- Time zone: UTC+3:30 (IRST)

Khvosh Mardan (Persian: خوشمردان) (Note: Also romanized as Khosh Mardan or Khvosh Mardān; also known as Khvūsh Mardān) is a village in Khvashod Rural District of Rud Ab District in Sabzevar County, Razavi Khorasan province, Iran.

== Demographics ==
=== Population ===
At the time of the 2006 National Census, the village's population was 171 in 62 households. The following census in 2011 counted 128 people in 53 households. The 2016 census measured the population of the village as 296 people in 103 households.
