= Barabad, Sabzevar =

Village in Razavi Khorasan province, Iran

Barabad Persian: براباد
- Village
- Location within Iran
- Coordinates: 36°04′10″N 57°18′44″E
- Country: Iran
- Province: Razavi Khorasan
- County: Sabzevar
- District: Rud Ab
- Rural District: Frughan

Population (2016)
  - Total: 707
- Time zone: UTC+3:30 (IRST)

Barabad (Persian: براباد) (Note: Also romanized as Barābād, Bor Ābād, and Borābād) is a village in Frughan Rural District of Rud Ab District in Sabzevar County, Razavi Khorasan province, Iran.

== Demographics ==
=== Population ===
At the time of the 2006 National Census, the village's population was 704 in 220 households. The following census in 2011 counted 749 people in 263 households. The 2016 census measured the population of the village as 707 people in 240 households.
