= Sabri, Iran =

Village in Razavi Khorasan province, Iran

Sabri Persian: صبري
- Village
- Location within Iran
- Coordinates: 35°43′42″N 56°55′45″E
- Country: Iran
- Province: Razavi Khorasan
- County: Sabzevar
- District: Rud Ab
- Rural District: Kuh Hamayi

Population (2016)
  - Total: 54
- Time zone: UTC+3:30 (IRST)

Sabri (Persian: صبري) (Note: Also romanized as Şabrī; also known as Ẕabarī) is a village in Kuh Hamayi Rural District of Rud Ab District in Sabzevar County, Razavi Khorasan province, Iran.

== Demographics ==
=== Population ===
At the time of the 2006 National Census, the village's population was 48 in 15 households. The following census in 2011 counted 73 people in 25 households. The 2016 census measured the population of the village as 54 people in 25 households.
