= Tut Ban =

Village in Razavi Khorasan province, Iran

Tut Ban Persian: توتبان
- Village
- Location within Iran
- Coordinates: 35°47′49″N 57°13′51″E
- Country: Iran
- Province: Razavi Khorasan
- County: Sabzevar
- District: Rud Ab
- Rural District: Kuh Hamayi

Population (2016)
  - Total: 53
- Time zone: UTC+3:30 (IRST)

Tut Ban (Persian: توتبان) (Note: Also romanized as Tūt Bān) is a village in Kuh Hamayi Rural District of Rud Ab District in Sabzevar County, Razavi Khorasan province, Iran.

== Demographics ==
=== Population ===
At the time of the 2006 National Census, the village's population was 42 in 14 households. The following census in 2011 counted 37 people in 13 households. The 2016 census measured the population of the village as 53 people in 18 households.
