= Chah Talekh, Razavi Khorasan =

Village in Razavi Khorasan province, Iran

Chah Talekh Persian: چاه تلخ
- Village
- Location within Iran
- Coordinates: 35°34′17″N 57°26′39″E
- Country: Iran
- Province: Razavi Khorasan
- County: Sabzevar
- District: Rud Ab
- Rural District: Khvashod

Population (2016)
  - Total: 279
- Time zone: UTC+3:30 (IRST)

Chah Talekh (Persian: چاه تلخ) (Note: Also romanized as Chāh Talekh) is a village in Khvashod Rural District of Rud Ab District in Sabzevar County, Razavi Khorasan province, Iran.

== Demographics ==
=== Population ===
At the time of the 2006 National Census, the village's population was 221 in 41 households. The following census in 2011 counted 260 people in 76 households. The 2016 census measured the population of the village as 279 people in 83 households.
