= Kalavi, Razavi Khorasan =

Village in Razavi Khorasan province, Iran

Kalavi Persian: كلاوي
- Village
- Location within Iran
- Coordinates: 35°38′37″N 57°06′30″E
- Country: Iran
- Province: Razavi Khorasan
- County: Sabzevar
- District: Rud Ab
- Rural District: Kuh Hamayi

Population (2016)
  - Total: 52
- Time zone: UTC+3:30 (IRST)

Kalavi (Persian: كلاوي) (Note: Also romanized as Kalāvī; also known as Talāvī) is a village in Kuh Hamayi Rural District of Rud Ab District in Sabzevar County, Razavi Khorasan province, Iran.

== Demographics ==
=== Population ===
At the time of the 2006 National Census, the village's population was 69 in 22 households. The following census in 2011 counted 57 people in 19 households. The 2016 census measured the population of the village as 52 people in 19 households.
