= Darqadam =

Village in Razavi Khorasan province, Iran

Darqadam Persian: درقدم
- Village
- Location within Iran
- Coordinates: 35°55′00″N 57°33′11″E
- Country: Iran
- Province: Razavi Khorasan
- County: Sabzevar
- District: Rud Ab
- Rural District: Khvashod

Population (2016)
  - Total: 504
- Time zone: UTC+3:30 (IRST)

Darqadam (Persian: درقدم) (Note: Also romanized as Dar Qadam; also known as Rowfekeh) is a village in Khvashod Rural District of Rud Ab District in Sabzevar County, Razavi Khorasan province, Iran.

== Demographics ==
=== Population ===
At the time of the 2006 National Census, the village's population was 374 in 101 households. The following census in 2011 counted 419 people in 115 households. The 2016 census measured the population of the village as 504 people in 162 households. It was the most populous village in its rural district.
