= Chah-e Shand =

Village in Razavi Khorasan province, Iran

Chah-e Shand Persian: چاه شند
- Village
- Location within Iran
- Coordinates: 35°30′38″N 57°08′50″E
- Country: Iran
- Province: Razavi Khorasan
- County: Sabzevar
- District: Rud Ab
- Rural District: Kuh Hamayi

Population (2016)
  - Total: 259
- Time zone: UTC+3:30 (IRST)

Chah-e Shand (Persian: چاه شند) (Note: Also romanized as Chāh-e Shand) is a village in Kuh Hamayi Rural District of Rud Ab District in Sabzevar County, Razavi Khorasan province, Iran.

== Demographics ==
=== Population ===
At the time of the 2006 National Census, the village's population was 201 in 43 households. The following census in 2011 counted 161 people in 40 households. The 2016 census measured the population of the village as 259 people in 72 households, the most populous in its rural district.
