= Do Chahi, Sabzevar =

Village in Razavi Khorasan province, Iran

Do Chahi Persian: دوچاهي
- Village
- Location within Iran
- Coordinates: 35°37′59″N 57°00′08″E
- Country: Iran
- Province: Razavi Khorasan
- County: Sabzevar
- District: Rud Ab
- Rural District: Kuh Hamayi

Population (2016)
  - Total: 112
- Time zone: UTC+3:30 (IRST)

Do Chahi (Persian: دوچاهي) (Note: Also romanized as Do Chāhī) is a village in Kuh Hamayi Rural District of Rud Ab District in Sabzevar County, Razavi Khorasan province, Iran.

== Demographics ==
=== Population ===
At the time of the 2006 National Census, the village's population was 99 in 26 households. The following census in 2011 counted 103 people in 27 households. The 2016 census measured the population of the village as 112 people in 32 households.
