= Filshur =

Village in Razavi Khorasan province, Iran

Filshur Persian: فيلشور
- Village
- Location within Iran
- Coordinates: 35°52′00″N 57°22′01″E
- Country: Iran
- Province: Razavi Khorasan
- County: Sabzevar
- District: Rud Ab
- Rural District: Frughan

Population (2016)
  - Total: 292
- Time zone: UTC+3:30 (IRST)

Filshur (Persian: فيلشور) (Note: Also romanized as Fīlshūr; also known as Felīshūr) is a village in Frughan Rural District of Rud Ab District in Sabzevar County, Razavi Khorasan province, Iran.

== Demographics ==
=== Population ===
At the time of the 2006 National Census, the village's population was 277 in 79 households. The following census in 2011 counted 228 people in 81 households. The 2016 census measured the population of the village as 292 people in 99 households.
