= Tazraq =

Tazraq (Persian: طزرق) may refer to:

- Tazraq, Afghanistan
- Tazraq, Iran
