= Aryan, Razavi Khorasan =

Village in Razavi Khorasan province, Iran

Aryan Persian: اريان
- Village
- Location within Iran
- Coordinates: 35°45′51″N 57°31′46″E
- Country: Iran
- Province: Razavi Khorasan
- County: Sabzevar
- District: Rud Ab
- Rural District: Khvashod

Population (2016)
  - Total: 439
- Time zone: UTC+3:30 (IRST)

Aryan (Persian: اريان) (Note: Also romanized as Āryān, ‘Orīān, ‘Oryān, and Oryān) is a village in Khvashod Rural District of Rud Ab District in Sabzevar County, Razavi Khorasan province, Iran.

== Demographics ==
=== Population ===
At the time of the 2006 National Census, the village's population was 560 in 155 households. The following census in 2011 counted 496 people in 175 households. The 2016 census measured the population of the village as 439 people in 157 households.
