= Ojnurd =

Village in Razavi Khorasan province, Iran

Ojnurd Persian: اجنورد
- Village
- Location within Iran
- Coordinates: 35°46′35″N 57°14′21″E
- Country: Iran
- Province: Razavi Khorasan
- County: Sabzevar
- District: Rud Ab
- Rural District: Kuh Hamayi

Population (2016)
  - Total: 104
- Time zone: UTC+3:30 (IRST)

Ojnurd (Persian: اجنورد) (Note: Also romanized as Ojnowrd and Ojnūrd; also known as Ūjnūrd) is a village in, and the capital of, Kuh Hamayi Rural District in Rud Ab District of Sabzevar County, Razavi Khorasan province, Iran.

== Demographics ==
=== Population ===
At the time of the 2006 National Census, the village's population was 133 in 41 households. The following census in 2011 counted 89 people in 35 households. The 2016 census measured the population of the village as 104 people in 46 households.
