= Kalateh-ye Mir Ali, Razavi Khorasan =

Village in Razavi Khorasan province, Iran

Kalateh-ye Mir Ali Persian: كلاته ميرعلي
- Village
- Location within Iran
- Coordinates: 35°56′29″N 57°08′25″E
- Country: Iran
- Province: Razavi Khorasan
- County: Sabzevar
- District: Rud Ab
- Rural District: Frughan

Population (2016)
  - Total: 190
- Time zone: UTC+3:30 (IRST)

Kalateh-ye Mir Ali (Persian: كلاته ميرعلي) (Note: Also romanized as Kalāteh-ye Mīr ‘Alī) is a village in Frughan Rural District of Rud Ab District in Sabzevar County, Razavi Khorasan province, Iran.

== Demographics ==
=== Population ===
At the time of the 2006 National Census, the village's population was 281 in 91 households. The following census in 2011 counted 269 people in 103 households. The 2016 census measured the population of the village as 190 people in 64 households.
