= Ardiz =

Village in Razavi Khorasan province, Iran

Ardiz Persian: ارديز
- Village
- Location within Iran
- Coordinates: 35°49′09″N 57°41′03″E
- Country: Iran
- Province: Razavi Khorasan
- County: Sabzevar
- District: Rud Ab
- Rural District: Khvashod

Population (2016)
  - Total: 292
- Time zone: UTC+3:30 (IRST)

Ardiz (Persian: ارديز) (Note: Also romanized as Ardīz) is a village in Khvashod Rural District of Rud Ab District in Sabzevar County, Razavi Khorasan province, Iran.

== Demographics ==
=== Population ===
At the time of the 2006 National Census, the village's population was 482 in 143 households. The following census in 2011 counted 325 people in 123 households. The 2016 census measured the population of the village as 292 people in 127 households.
