= Hamayi-ye Olya =

Village in Razavi Khorasan province, Iran

Hamayi-ye Olya Persian: همايي عليا
- Village
- Location within Iran
- Country: Iran
- Province: Razavi Khorasan
- County: Sabzevar
- District: Rud Ab
- Rural District: Kuh Hamayi

Population (2016)
  - Total: 0
- Time zone: UTC+3:30 (IRST)

Hamayi-ye Olya (Persian: همايي عليا) (Note: Also romanized as Hamā’ī-ye ‘Olyā; also known as Homā’ī, Homai-ye Olya, and Homā’ī-ye ‘Olyā) is a village in Kuh Hamayi Rural District of Rud Ab District in Sabzevar County, Razavi Khorasan province, Iran.

== Demographics ==
=== Population ===
At the time of the 2006 National Census, the village's population was 66 in 20 households. The following census in 2011 counted 75 people in 26 households. The 2016 census measured the population of the village as zero.
