= Chah-e Setareh =

Village in Razavi Khorasan province, Iran

Chah-e Setareh Persian: چاه ستاره
- Village
- Location within Iran
- Coordinates: 35°36′26″N 57°04′48″E
- Country: Iran
- Province: Razavi Khorasan
- County: Sabzevar
- District: Rud Ab
- Rural District: Kuh Hamayi

Population (2016)
  - Total: 113
- Time zone: UTC+3:30 (IRST)

Chah-e Setareh (Persian: چاه ستاره) (Note: Also romanized as Chāh-e Setāreh) is a village in Kuh Hamayi Rural District of Rud Ab District in Sabzevar County, Razavi Khorasan province, Iran.

== Demographics ==
=== Population ===
At the time of the 2006 National Census, the village's population was 171 in 35 households. The following census in 2011 counted 123 people in 36 households. The 2016 census measured the population of the village as 113 people in 36 households.
