= Koruj, Sabzevar =

Koruj كروج
- Village
- Location within Iran
- Coordinates: 35°39′53″N 57°13′32″E
- Country: Iran
- Province: Razavi Khorasan
- County: Sabzevar
- Bakhsh: Rud Ab
- Rural District: Kuh Hamayi

Population (2006)
  - Total: 35
- Time zone: UTC+3:30 (IRST)
  - Summer (DST): UTC+4:30 (IRDT)

Koruj (Persian: كروج, also Romanized as Korūj; also known as Korūch) is a village in Kuh Hamayi Rural District, Rud Ab District, Sabzevar County, Razavi Khorasan Province, Iran. At the 2006 census, its population was 35, in 10 families.
