= Bon Jakh =

Village in Razavi Khorasan province, Iran

Bon Jakh Persian: بن جخ
- Village
- Location within Iran
- Coordinates: 35°45′18″N 57°11′22″E
- Country: Iran
- Province: Razavi Khorasan
- County: Sabzevar
- District: Rud Ab
- Rural District: Kuh Hamayi

Population (2016)
  - Total: 72
- Time zone: UTC+3:30 (IRST)

Bon Jakh (Persian: بن جخ) is a village in Kuh Hamayi Rural District of Rud Ab District in Sabzevar County, Razavi Khorasan province, Iran.

== Demographics ==
=== Population ===
At the time of the 2006 National Census, the village's population was 124 in 42 households. The following census in 2011 counted 67 people in 31 households. The 2016 census measured the population of the village as 72 people in 31 households.
