= Homeyreh =

Homeyreh or Hamireh (Persian: حميره) may refer to:

- Hamireh, Khuzestan
- Homeyreh, Razavi Khorasan
