= Garu, Sabzevar =

Village in Razavi Khorasan province, Iran

Garu Persian: گرو
- Village
- Location within Iran
- Coordinates: 35°45′10″N 57°00′23″E
- Country: Iran
- Province: Razavi Khorasan
- County: Sabzevar
- District: Rud Ab
- Rural District: Kuh Hamayi

Population (2016)
  - Total: 118
- Time zone: UTC+3:30 (IRST)

Garu (Persian: گرو) (Note: Also romanized as Garow and Garū) is a village in Kuh Hamayi Rural District of Rud Ab District in Sabzevar County, Razavi Khorasan province, Iran.

== Demographics ==
=== Population ===
At the time of the 2006 National Census, the village's population was 131 in 29 households. The following census in 2011 counted 137 people in 47 households. The 2016 census measured the population of the village as 118 people in 44 households.
