= Kalavashk =

Kalavashk or Kalaveshk (Persian: كلاوشك) may refer to:

- Kalavashk, Rud Ab
- Kalavashk, Sheshtomad
