= Garmak, Razavi Khorasan =

Village in Razavi Khorasan province, Iran

Garmak Persian: گرمك
- Village
- Location within Iran
- Coordinates: 35°51′21″N 57°38′52″E
- Country: Iran
- Province: Razavi Khorasan
- County: Sabzevar
- District: Rud Ab
- Rural District: Khvashod

Population (2016)
  - Total: 205
- Time zone: UTC+3:30 (IRST)

Garmak (Persian: گرمك) is a village in Khvashod Rural District of Rud Ab District in Sabzevar County, Razavi Khorasan province, Iran.

== Demographics ==
=== Population ===
At the time of the 2006 National Census, the village's population was 211 in 73 households. The following census in 2011 counted 143 people in 59 households. The 2016 census measured the population of the village as 205 people in 74 households.
