= Dam Rud =

Village in Razavi Khorasan province, Iran

Dam Rud Persian: دامرود
- Village
- Location within Iran
- Coordinates: 36°01′56″N 57°14′12″E
- Country: Iran
- Province: Razavi Khorasan
- County: Sabzevar
- District: Rud Ab
- Rural District: Frughan

Population (2016)
  - Total: 222
- Time zone: UTC+3:30 (IRST)

Dam Rud (Persian: دامرود) (Note: Also romanized as Dām Rūd) is a village in Frughan Rural District of Rud Ab District in Sabzevar County, Razavi Khorasan province, Iran.

== Demographics ==
=== Population ===
At the time of the 2006 National Census, the village's population was 238 in 65 households. The following census in 2011 counted 214 people in 70 households. The 2016 census measured the population of the village as 222 people in 76 households.
