= Daryacheh, Razavi Khorasan =

Village in Razavi Khorasan province, Iran

Daryacheh Persian: درياچه
- Village
- Location within Iran
- Coordinates: 35°41′29″N 57°03′40″E
- Country: Iran
- Province: Razavi Khorasan
- County: Sabzevar
- District: Rud Ab
- Rural District: Kuh Hamayi

Population (2016)
  - Total: 55
- Time zone: UTC+3:30 (IRST)

Daryacheh (Persian: درياچه) (Note: Also romanized as Daryācheh) is a village in Kuh Hamayi Rural District of Rud Ab District in Sabzevar County, Razavi Khorasan province, Iran.

== Demographics ==
=== Population ===
At the time of the 2006 National Census, the village's population was 121 in 30 households. The following census in 2011 counted 79 people in 24 households. The 2016 census measured the population of the village as 55 people in 21 households.
