= Shamkan =

City in Razavi Khorasan province, Iran

Shamkan Persian: شامکان
- City
- Location within Iran
- Coordinates: 35°59′54″N 58°12′01″E
- Country: Iran
- Province: Razavi Khorasan
- County: Sheshtamad
- District: Shamkan

Population (2016)
  - Total: 1,882
- Time zone: UTC+3:30 (IRST)

Shamkan (Persian: شامكان) (Note: Also romanized as Shāmkān; also known as Shāhmakān) is a city in, and the capital of, Shamkan District of Sheshtamad County, Razavi Khorasan province, Iran. It also serves as the administrative center for Shamkan Rural District.

== Demographics ==
=== Population ===
At the time of the 2006 National Census, Shamkan's population was 2,102 in 541 households, when it was a village in Shamkan Rural District of the former Sheshtamad District in Sabzevar County. The following census in 2011 counted 2,439 people in 710 households. The 2016 census measured the population of the village as 1,882 people in 581 households, the most populous in its rural district.

In 2020, the district was separated from the county in the establishment of Sheshtamad County, and the rural district was transferred to the new Shamkan District. Shamkan was converted to a city in 2022.
