= Malvand =

Malvand (Persian: ملوند) may refer to:

- Malvand, Razavi Khorasan
- Malvand, South Khorasan
