= Malvand, Razavi Khorasan =

Village in Razavi Khorasan province, Iran

Malvand Persian: ملوند
- Village
- Location within Iran
- Coordinates: 35°58′49″N 57°14′57″E
- Country: Iran
- Province: Razavi Khorasan
- County: Sabzevar
- District: Rud Ab
- Rural District: Frughan

Population (2016)
  - Total: 1,007
- Time zone: UTC+3:30 (IRST)

Malvand (Persian: ملوند) is a village in Frughan Rural District of Rud Ab District in Sabzevar County, Razavi Khorasan province, Iran.

== Demographics ==
=== Population ===
At the time of the 2006 National Census, the village's population was 884 in 216 households. The following census in 2011 counted 912 people in 300 households. The 2016 census measured the population of the village as 1,007 people in 331 households, the most populous in its rural district.
