= Dareyn =

Dareyn (Persian: دارين) may refer to:

- Dareyn, Razavi Khorasan
- Dareyn, Yazd
