= Deruk, Razavi Khorasan =

Village in Razavi Khorasan province, Iran

Deruk Persian: دروك
- Village
- Location within Iran
- Coordinates: 36°02′56″N 57°14′27″E
- Country: Iran
- Province: Razavi Khorasan
- County: Sabzevar
- District: Rud Ab
- Rural District: Frughan

Population (2016)
  - Total: 86
- Time zone: UTC+3:30 (IRST)

Deruk (Persian: دروك) (Note: Also romanized as Derūk, Doruk, and Dorūk) is a village in Frughan Rural District of Rud Ab District in Sabzevar County, Razavi Khorasan province, Iran.

== Demographics ==
=== Population ===
At the time of the 2006 National Census, the village's population was 119 in 38 households. The following census in 2011 counted 104 people in 39 households. The 2016 census measured the population of the village as 86 people in 36 households.
