= Dareyn, Razavi Khorasan =

Village in Razavi Khorasan province, Iran

Dareyn Persian: دارين
- Village
- Location within Iran
- Coordinates: 35°57′24″N 57°27′06″E
- Country: Iran
- Province: Razavi Khorasan
- County: Sabzevar
- District: Rud Ab
- Rural District: Frughan

Population (2016)
  - Total: 356
- Time zone: UTC+3:30 (IRST)

Dareyn (Persian: دارين) (Note: Also romanized as Dāreyn; also known as Feyr-e Sarā) is a village in Frughan Rural District of Rud Ab District in Sabzevar County, Razavi Khorasan province, Iran.

== Demographics ==
=== Population ===
At the time of the 2006 National Census, the village's population was 459 in 146 households. The following census in 2011 counted 345 people in 130 households. The 2016 census measured the population of the village as 356 people in 134 households.
