= Bojdan, Rud Ab =

Village in Razavi Khorasan province, Iran

Bojdan Persian: بجدن
- Village
- Location within Iran
- Coordinates: 35°47′55″N 57°36′15″E
- Country: Iran
- Province: Razavi Khorasan
- County: Sabzevar
- District: Rud Ab
- Rural District: Khvashod

Population (2016)
  - Total: 318
- Time zone: UTC+3:30 (IRST)

Bojdan (Persian: بجدن) (Note: Also romanized as Bojdān; also known as Bojdan-e Khvāshod) is a village in, and the capital of, Khvashod Rural District in Rud Ab District of Sabzevar County, Razavi Khorasan province, Iran.

== Demographics ==
=== Population ===
At the time of the 2006 National Census, the rural district's population was 402 in 135 households. The following census in 2011 counted 295 people in 114 households. The 2016 census measured the population of the village as 318 people in 130 households.
