= Parvand, Razavi Khorasan =

Village in Razavi Khorasan province, Iran

Parvand Persian: پروند
- Village
- Location within Iran
- Coordinates: 35°56′30″N 57°05′56″E
- Country: Iran
- Province: Razavi Khorasan
- County: Sabzevar
- District: Rud Ab
- Rural District: Frughan

Population (2016)
  - Total: 225
- Time zone: UTC+3:30 (IRST)

Parvand (Persian: پروند) is a village in Frughan Rural District of Rud Ab District in Sabzevar County, Razavi Khorasan province, Iran.

== Demographics ==
=== Population ===
At the time of the 2006 National Census, the village's population was 396 in 100 households. The following census in 2011 counted 245 people in 74 households. The 2016 census measured the population of the village as 225 people in 82 households.
