= Koruj =

Koruj (Persian: كروج) may refer to:

- Koruj, Isfahan
- Koruj, Sabzevar, Razavi Khorasan Province
