= Takab-e Kuhmish Rural District =

Rural district in Razavi Khorasan province, Iran

Takab-e Kuhmish Rural District Persian: دهستان تكاب كوه ميش
- Rural District
- Location within Iran
- Coordinates: 35°46′N 57°53′E
- Country: Iran
- Province: Razavi Khorasan
- County: Sheshtamad
- District: Central
- Established: 1987
- Capital: Tondok

Population (2016)
  - Total: 4,126
- Time zone: UTC+3:30 (IRST)

Takab-e Kuhmish Rural District (Persian: دهستان تكاب كوه ميش) is in the Central District of Sheshtamad County, Razavi Khorasan province, Iran. Its capital is the village of Tondok.

== Demographics ==
=== Population ===
At the time of the 2006 National Census, the rural district's population (as a part of the former Sheshtamad District in Sabzevar County) was 5,000 in 1,435 households. There were 4,758 inhabitants in 1,504 households at the following census of 2011. The 2016 census measured the population of the rural district as 4,126 in 1,422 households. The most populous of its 45 villages was Tondok, with 1,434 people.

In 2020, the district was separated from the county in the establishment of Sheshtamad County, and the rural district was transferred to the new Central District.

=== Other villages in the rural district ===
- Chah Sukhteh
- Mehrshani
- Mej
- Qasemi
- Shahr Sukhteh
- Torosk
