= Frughan Rural District =

Rural district in Razavi Khorasan province, Iran

Frughan Rural District Persian: دهستان فروغن
- Rural District
- Location within Iran
- Coordinates: 36°00′N 57°08′E
- Country: Iran
- Province: Razavi Khorasan
- County: Sabzevar
- District: Rud Ab
- Established: 1987
- Capital: Rud Ab

Population (2016)
  - Total: 3,758
- Time zone: UTC+3:30 (IRST)

Frughan Rural District (Persian: دهستان فروغن) is in Rud Ab District of Sabzevar County, Razavi Khorasan province, Iran. It is administered from the city of Rud Ab. (Note: Formerly the village of Qaleh Now-e Rud Ab)

== Demographics ==
=== Population ===
At the time of the 2006 National Census, the rural district's population was 4,151 in 1,182 households. There were 3,877 inhabitants in 1,330 households at the following census of 2011. The 2016 census measured the population of the rural district as 3,758 in 1,304 households. The most populous of its 19 villages was Malvand, with 1,007 people.

=== Other villages in the rural district ===
- Barabad
- Dam Rud
- Dareyn
- Deruk
- Filshur
- Kalateh-ye Mir Ali
- Parvand
- Poshteh Abbas
- Shamsabad
- Tasband
