= Rob-e Shamat Rural District =

Rural district in Razavi Khorasan province, Iran

Rob-e Shamat Rural District Persian: دهستان ربع شامات
- Rural District
- Location within Iran
- Coordinates: 35°37′N 58°03′E
- Country: Iran
- Province: Razavi Khorasan
- County: Sheshtamad
- District: Shamkan
- Established: 1987
- Capital: Qaleh Meydan

Population (2016)
  - Total: 4,385
- Time zone: UTC+3:30 (IRST)

Rob-e Shamat Rural District (Persian: دهستان ربع شامات) is in Shamkan District of Sheshtamad County, Razavi Khorasan province, Iran. Its capital is the village of Qaleh Meydan.

== Demographics ==
=== Population ===
At the time of the 2006 National Census, the rural district's population was (as a part of the former Sheshtamad District in Sabzevar County) was 4,663 in 1,177 households. There were 4,806 inhabitants in 1,376 households at the following census of 2011. The 2016 census measured the population of the rural district as 4,385 in 1,376 households. The most populous of its 42 villages was Deh-e Now, with 649 people.

In 2020, the district was separated from the county in the establishment of Sheshtamad County, and the rural district was transferred to the new Shamkan District.

=== Other villages in the rural district ===
- Albolagh
- Beyrut
- Chenar
- Hasanabad
- Kalateh-ye Tir Kaman
- Kharasf
- Rowshanabad
- Sabbeh
