= Beyhaq Rural District =

Rural district in Razavi Khorasan province, Iran

Beyhaq Rural District Persian: دهستان بيهق
- Rural District
- Location within Iran
- Coordinates: 35°58′N 57°45′E
- Country: Iran
- Province: Razavi Khorasan
- County: Sheshtamad
- District: Central
- Established: 1987
- Capital: Sheshtomad

Population (2016)
  - Total: 6,871
- Time zone: UTC+3:30 (IRST)

Beyhaq Rural District (Persian: دهستان بيهق) is in the Central District of Sheshtamad County, Razavi Khorasan province, Iran. It is administered from the city of Sheshtomad.

== Demographics ==
=== Population ===
At the time of the 2006 National Census, the rural district's population (as a part of the former Sheshtamad District in Sabzevar County) was 7,417 in 2,237 households. There were 7,826 inhabitants in 2,595 households at the following census of 2011. The 2016 census measured the population of the rural district as 6,871 in 2,330 households. The most populous of its 143 villages was Keyzur, with 1,222 people.

In 2020, the district was separated from the county in the establishment of Sheshtamad County, and the rural district was transferred to the new Central District.

=== Other villages in the rural district ===
- Aliabad-e Seyyed Rahim
- Azizabad
- Bad Ashian
- Bagh Kheyrat
- Barazq
- Besk
- Beyzakh
- Bojdan
- Cheshmeh Avash
- Divaneh Khuy
- Ebrahimabad
- Gach
- Halakabad
- Hasanabad
- Hoseynabad
- Jonbaz
- Kalateh-ye Bayat
- Kalateh-ye Sadat
- Kalavashk
- Kashk
- Keyzaqan
- Pa Dar
- Sar Rud
- Soqiyeh
- Sudabad
- Tazraq
