= Deruk =

Deruk or Doruk (Persian: دروك) may refer to:

- Deruk, Golestan
- Doruk, Razavi Khorasan
- Deruk, Sistan and Baluchestan
