= Rud Ab =

City in Razavi Khorasan province, Iran

Rud Ab Persian: روداب
- City
- Location within Iran
- Coordinates: 36°01′15″N 57°18′46″E
- Country: Iran
- Province: Razavi Khorasan
- County: Sabzevar
- District: Rud Ab
- Established as a city: 1996

Population (2016)
  - Total: 4,028
- Time zone: UTC+3:30 (IRST)

Rud Ab (Persian: روداب) (Note: Also romanized as Rūd Āb, formerly known as Qaleh Now-e Rud Ab (قلعه نو روداب)) is a city in, and the capital of, Rud Ab District of Sabzevar County, Razavi Khorasan province, Iran. It also serves as the administrative center for Frughan Rural District. The village of Qaleh Now-e Rud Ab was converted to the city of Rud Ab in 1996.

== Demographics ==
=== Population ===
At the time of the 2006 National Census, the city's population was 3,470 in 883 households. The following census in 2011 counted 4,042 people in 1,229 households. The 2016 census measured the population of the city as 4,028 people in 1,254 households.
