= Shamkan Rural District =

Rural district in Razavi Khorasan province, Iran

Shamkan Rural District Persian: دهستان ربع شامكان
- Rural District
- Location within Iran
- Coordinates: 35°57′N 58°08′E
- Country: Iran
- Province: Razavi Khorasan
- County: Sheshtamad
- District: Shamkan
- Established: 1987
- Capital: Shamkan

Population (2016)
  - Total: 5,771
- Time zone: UTC+3:30 (IRST)

Shamkan Rural District (Persian: دهستان شامكان) is in Shamkan District of Sheshtamad County, Razavi Khorasan province, Iran. It is administered from the city of Shamkan.

== Demographics ==
=== Population ===
At the time of the 2006 National Census, the rural district's population (as a part of the former Sheshtamad District in Sabzevar County) was 5,947 in 1,453 households. There were 6,520 inhabitants in 1,863 households at the following census of 2011. The 2016 census measured the population of the rural district as 5,771 in 1,738 households. The most populous of its 20 villages was Shamkan (now a city), with 1,882 people.

In 2020, the district was separated from the county in the establishment of Sheshtamad County, and the rural district was transferred to the new Shamkan District.

=== Other villages in the rural district ===
- Aliabad-e Tarkan
- Hoseynabad
- Kalateh-ye Now Bahar
- Now Bahar
- Sanjerd
- Yahyaabad
