= Sheshtomad =

City in Razavi Khorasan province, Iran

Sheshtomad Persian: ششتمد
- City
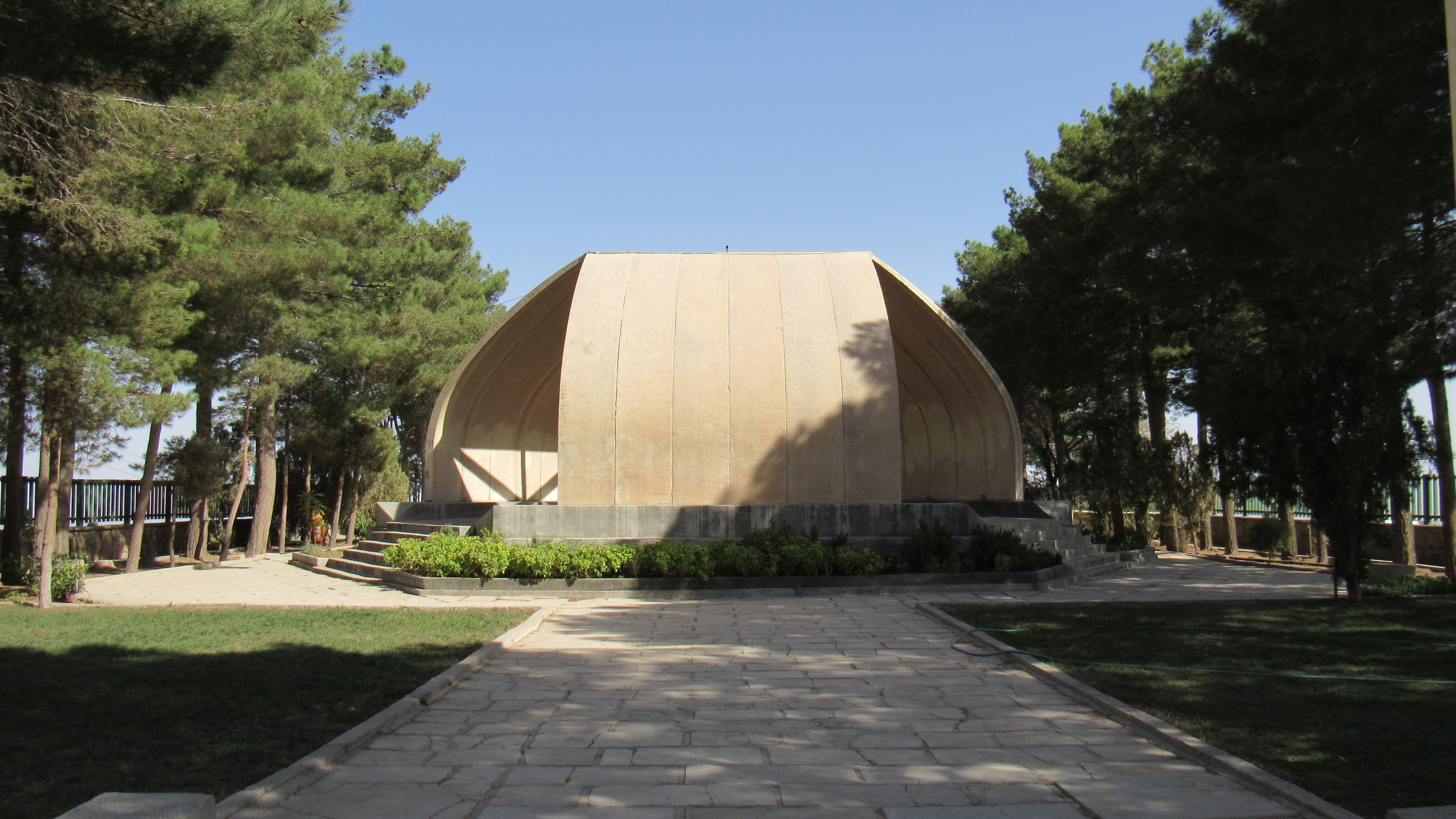
- Ebne Fandogh Tomb

- Location within Iran
- Coordinates: 35°57′35″N 57°46′00″E
- Country: Iran
- Province: Razavi Khorasan
- County: Sheshtamad
- District: Central

Population (2016)
  - Total: 3,108
- Time zone: UTC+3:30 (IRST)

Sheshtomad (Persian: ششتمد) (Note: Also romanized as Sheshtamad) is a city in the Central District of Sheshtamad County, Razavi Khorasan province, Iran, serving as capital of both the county and the district. It also serves as the administrative center for Beyhaq Rural District.

== Demographics ==
=== Population ===
At the time of the 2006 National Census, the city's population was 2,246 in 671 households, when it was capital of the former Sheshtamad District in Sabzevar County. The following census in 2011 counted 4,172 people in 1,099 households. The 2016 census measured the population of the city as 3,108 people in 920 households.

In 2020, the district was separated from the county in the establishment of Sheshtamad County. The city and the rural district were transferred to the new Central District, with Sheshtomad as the county's capital.
