= Parvand, Kerman =

Parvand پروند
- Village
- Location within Iran
- Coordinates: 28°47′01″N 57°33′46″E
- Country: Iran
- Province: Kerman
- County: Jiroft
- Bakhsh: Central
- Rural District: Halil

Population (2006)
  - Total: 104
- Time zone: UTC+3:30 (IRST)
  - Summer (DST): UTC+4:30 (IRDT)

Parvand (Persian: پروند) is a village in Halil Rural District, in the Central District of Jiroft County, Kerman Province, Iran. At the 2006 census, its population was 104, in 22 families.
