= Doruk (name) =

Doruk is a Turkish given name and surname for males. Notable people with this name include:

== Given name ==
- Doruk Çetin (born 1987), Turkish film producer

== Surname ==
- Belgin Doruk (1936–1995), Turkish film actress
