= Tazraq, Afghanistan =

Tazraq
- Village
- Location in Afghanistan
- Coordinates: 37°12′44″N 67°39′31″E
- Country: Afghanistan
- Province: Balkh Province
- Time zone: + 4.30

Tazraq is a village in Balkh Province, in northern Afghanistan. It is located near the border with Tajikistan, located on the Amu Darya river which forms the boundary.

== See also ==
- Balkh Province
