= Hamireh, Khuzestan =

Hamireh حميره
- Village
- Location within Iran
- Coordinates: 31°01′08″N 49°11′36″E
- Country: Iran
- Province: Khuzestan
- County: Ahvaz
- Bakhsh: Central
- Rural District: Gheyzaniyeh

Population (2006)
  - Total: 194
- Time zone: UTC+3:30 (IRST)
  - Summer (DST): UTC+4:30 (IRDT)

Hamireh (Persian: حميره, also Romanized as Ḩamīreh, Hamīreh, and Ḩomeyreh; also known as Ḩameyr and Humāirāh) is a village in Gheyzaniyeh Rural District, in the Central District of Ahvaz County, Khuzestan Province, Iran. At the 2006 census, its population was 194, in 20 families.
