= Kuh Hamayi Rural District =

Rural district in Razavi Khorasan province, Iran

Kuh Hamayi Rural District Persian: دهستان كوه همائي
- Rural District
- Location within Iran
- Coordinates: 35°41′N 57°06′E
- Country: Iran
- Province: Razavi Khorasan
- County: Sabzevar
- District: Rud Ab
- Established: 1987
- Capital: Ojnurd

Population (2016)
  - Total: 1,449
- Time zone: UTC+3:30 (IRST)

Kuh Hamayi Rural District (Persian: دهستان كوه همائي) is in Rud Ab District of Sabzevar County, Razavi Khorasan province, Iran. Its capital is the village of Ojnurd.

== Demographics ==
=== Population ===
At the time of the 2006 National Census, the rural district's population was 2,211 in 588 households. There were 1,643 inhabitants in 515 households at the following census of 2011. The 2016 census measured the population of the rural district as 1,449 in 521 households. The most populous of its 66 villages was Chah-e Shand, with 259 people.

=== Other villages in the rural district ===
- Bon Jakh
- Chah-e Setareh
- Daryacheh
- Do Chahi
- Garu
- Hamayi-ye Olya
- Kalavi
- Sabri
- Tut Ban
- Zu ol Farrokh
