= Khvashod Rural District =

Rural district in Razavi Khorasan province, Iran

Khvashod Rural District Persian: دهستان خواشد
- Rural District
- Location within Iran
- Coordinates: 35°44′N 57°29′E
- Country: Iran
- Province: Razavi Khorasan
- County: Sabzevar
- District: Rud Ab
- Established: 1987
- Capital: Bojdan

Population (2016)
  - Total: 4,171
- Time zone: UTC+3:30 (IRST)

Khvashod Rural District (Persian: دهستان خواشد) is in Rud Ab District of Sabzevar County, Razavi Khorasan province, Iran. Its capital is the village of Bojdan.

== Demographics ==
=== Population ===
At the time of the 2006 National Census, the rural district's population was 4,779 in 1,510 households. There were 3,953 inhabitants in 1,440 households at the following census of 2011. The 2016 census measured the population of the rural district as 4,171 in 1,575 households. The most populous of its 113 villages was Darqadam, with 504 people.

=== Other villages in the rural district ===
- Ardiz
- Aryan
- Ban Qan
- Chah Talekh
- Estaj
- Garmak
- Khvosh Mardan
