= Shamkan District =

District in Razavi Khorasan province, Iran

Shamkan District Persian: بخش شامکان
- District
- Location within Iran
- Coordinates: 35°48′N 58°08′E
- Country: Iran
- Province: Razavi Khorasan
- County: Sheshtamad
- Established: 2020
- Capital: Shamkan
- Time zone: UTC+3:30 (IRST)

Shamkan District (Persian: بخش شامکان) is in Sheshtamad County, Razavi Khorasan province, Iran. It is administered from the city of Shamkan, whose population at the time of the 2016 National Census was 1,882 in 581 households.

== History ==
In 2020, Sheshtamad District was separated from Sabzevar County in the establishment of Sheshtamad County, which was divided into two districts of two rural districts each, with the city of Sheshtomad as its capital. The village of Shamkan was converted to a city in 2022.

== Demographics ==
=== Administrative divisions ===
Shamkan District
Administrative Divisions
Rob-e Shamat RD
Shamkan RD
Shamkan (city) (Note: Became a city after the 2016 census)
RD = Rural District
