= Central District (Sheshtamad County) =

District in Razavi Khorasan province, Iran

Central District (Sheshtamad County) Persian: بخش مرکزی شهرستان ششتمد
- District
- Location within Iran
- Coordinates: 35°49′N 57°47′E
- Country: Iran
- Province: Razavi Khorasan
- County: Sheshtamad
- Established: 2020
- Capital: Sheshtomad
- Time zone: UTC+3:30 (IRST)

The Central District of Sheshtamad County (Persian: بخش مرکزی شهرستان ششتمد) is in Razavi Khorasan province, Iran. Its capital is the city of Sheshtomad, whose population at the time of the 2016 National Census was 3,108 in 920 households.

== History ==
In 2020, Sheshtamad District was separated from Sabzevar County in the establishment of Sheshtamad County, which was divided into two districts of two rural districts each, with Sheshtomad as its capital and only city at the time.

== Demographics ==
=== Administrative divisions ===
Central District (Sheshtamad County)
Administrative Divisions
Beyhaq RD
Takab-e Kuhmish RD
Sheshtomad (city)
RD = Rural District
