= Rud Ab District (Sabzevar County) =

District in Razavi Khorasan province, Iran

Rud Ab District Persian: بخش رودآب
- District
- Location within Iran
- Coordinates: 35°48′N 57°15′E
- Country: Iran
- Province: Razavi Khorasan
- County: Sabzevar
- Capital: Rud Ab

Population (2016)
  - Total: 13,406
- Time zone: UTC+3:30 (IRST)

Rud Ab District (Persian: بخش رودآب) is in Sabzevar County, Razavi Khorasan province, Iran. Its capital is the city of Rud Ab. (Note: Formerly the village of Qaleh Now-e Rud Ab)

== Demographics ==
=== Population ===
At the time of the 2006 National Census, the district's population was 14,611 in 4,163 households. The following census in 2011 counted 13,515 people in 4,514 households. The 2016 census measured the population of the district as 13,406 inhabitants in 4,654 households.

=== Administrative divisions ===
Rud Ab District Population
Administrative Divisions	2006	2011	2016
Frughan RD	4,151	3,877	3,758
Khvashod RD	4,779	3,953	4,171
Kuh Hamayi RD	2,211	1,643	1,449
Rud Ab (city)	3,470	4,042	4,028
Total	14,611	13,515	13,406
RD = Rural District
