= Sheshtamad County =

County in Razavi Khorasan province, Iran

Sheshtamad County Persian: شهرستان ششتمد
- County
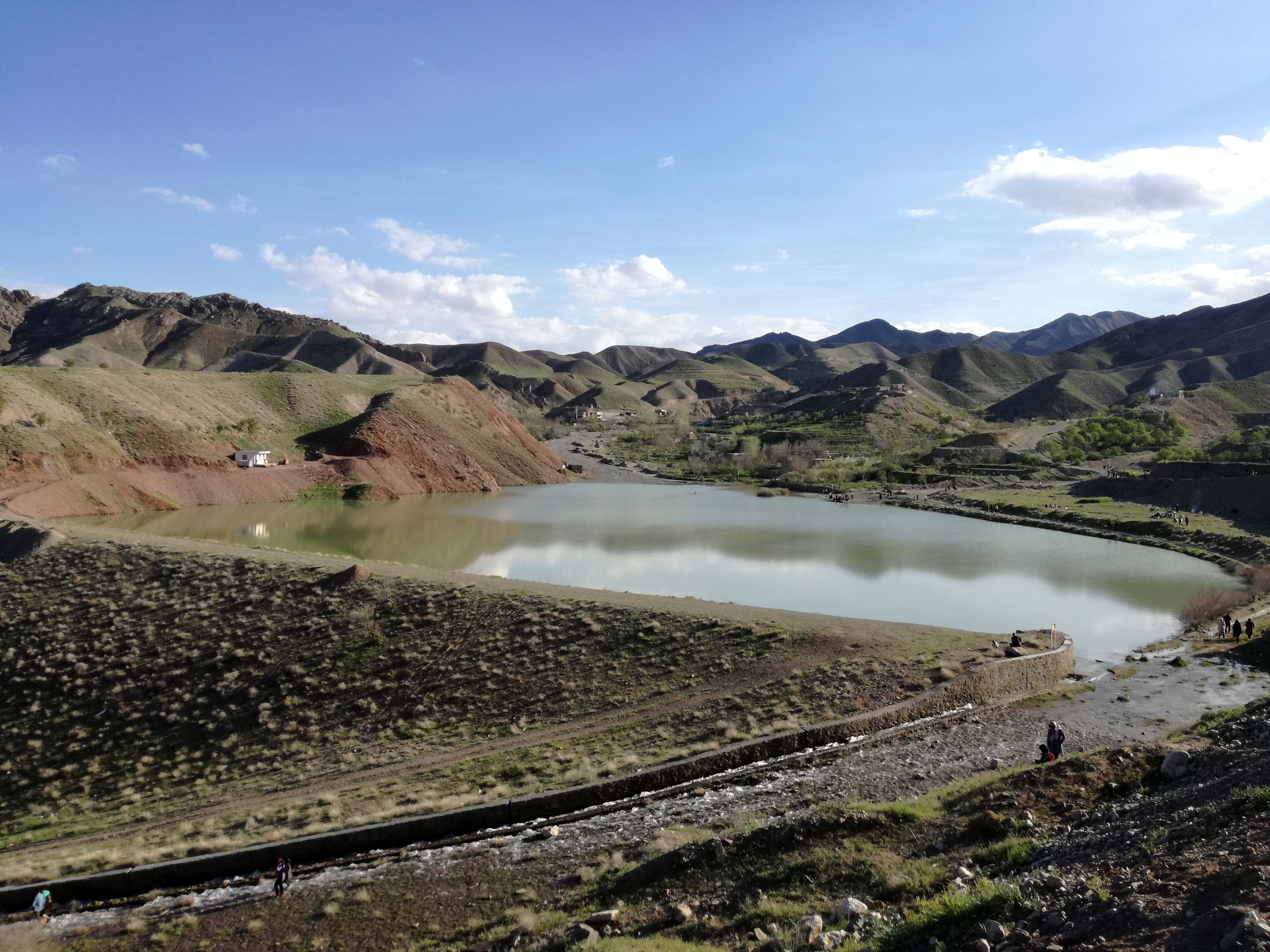
- Sheshtamad Dam

- Location of Sheshtamad County in Razavi Khorasan province (center left, yellow)

- Location of Razavi Khorasan province in Iran
- Coordinates: 35°48′N 57°57′E
- Country: Iran
- Province: Razavi Khorasan
- Established: 2020
- Capital: Sheshtomad
- Districts: Central, Shamkan

Area
  - Total: 2,937 km^{2} (1,134 sq mi)
- Time zone: UTC+3:30 (IRST)

Sheshtamad County (Persian: شهرستان ششتمد) is located in Razavi Khorasan province, Iran. Its capital is the city of Sheshtomad, whose population at the time of the 2016 National Census was 3,108 in 920 households.

== History ==
In 2020, Sheshtamad District was separated from Sabzevar County in the establishment of Sheshtamad County, which was divided into two districts of two rural districts each, with Sheshtomad as its capital and only city at the time. The village of Shamkan was converted to a city in 2022.

== Demographics ==
=== Administrative divisions ===
Sheshtamad County's administrative structure is shown in the following table.

Sheshtamad County
Administrative Divisions
Central District
Beyhaq RD
Takab-e Kuhmish RD
Sheshtomad (city)
Shamkan District
Rob-e Shamat RD
Shamkan RD
Shamkan (city) (Note: Became a city after the 2016 census)
RD = Rural District

== See also ==
Media related to Sheshtamad County at Wikimedia Commons
