= Sheshtamad District =

Former district in Razavi Khorasan province, Iran

Sheshtamad District Persian: بخش ششتمد
- Former District
- Location within Iran
- Coordinates: 35°48′N 57°57′E
- Country: Iran
- Province: Razavi Khorasan
- County: Sabzevar
- Capital: Sheshtomad

Population (2016)
  - Total: 24,261
- Time zone: UTC+3:30 (IRST)

Sheshtamad District (Persian: بخش ششتمد) is a former administrative division of Sabzevar County, Razavi Khorasan province, Iran. Its capital was the city of Sheshtomad.

== History ==
In 2020, the district was separated from the county in the establishment of Sheshtamad County.

== Demographics ==
=== Population ===
At the time of the 2006 National Census, the district's population was 25,273 in 6,973 households. The following census in 2011 counted 28,082 people in 8,437 households. The 2016 census measured the population of the district as 24,261 inhabitants in 7,786 households.

=== Administrative divisions ===
Sheshtamad District Population
Administrative Divisions	2006	2011	2016
Beyhaq RD	7,417	7,826	6,871
Rob-e Shamat RD	4,663	4,806	4,385
Shamkan RD	5,947	6,520	5,771
Takab-e Kuhmish RD	5,000	4,758	4,126
Sheshtomad (city)	2,246	4,172	3,108
Total	25,273	28,082	24,261
RD = Rural District
