= Sabzevar County =

County in Razavi Khorasan province, Iran

Sabzevar County Persian: شهرستان سبزوار
- County
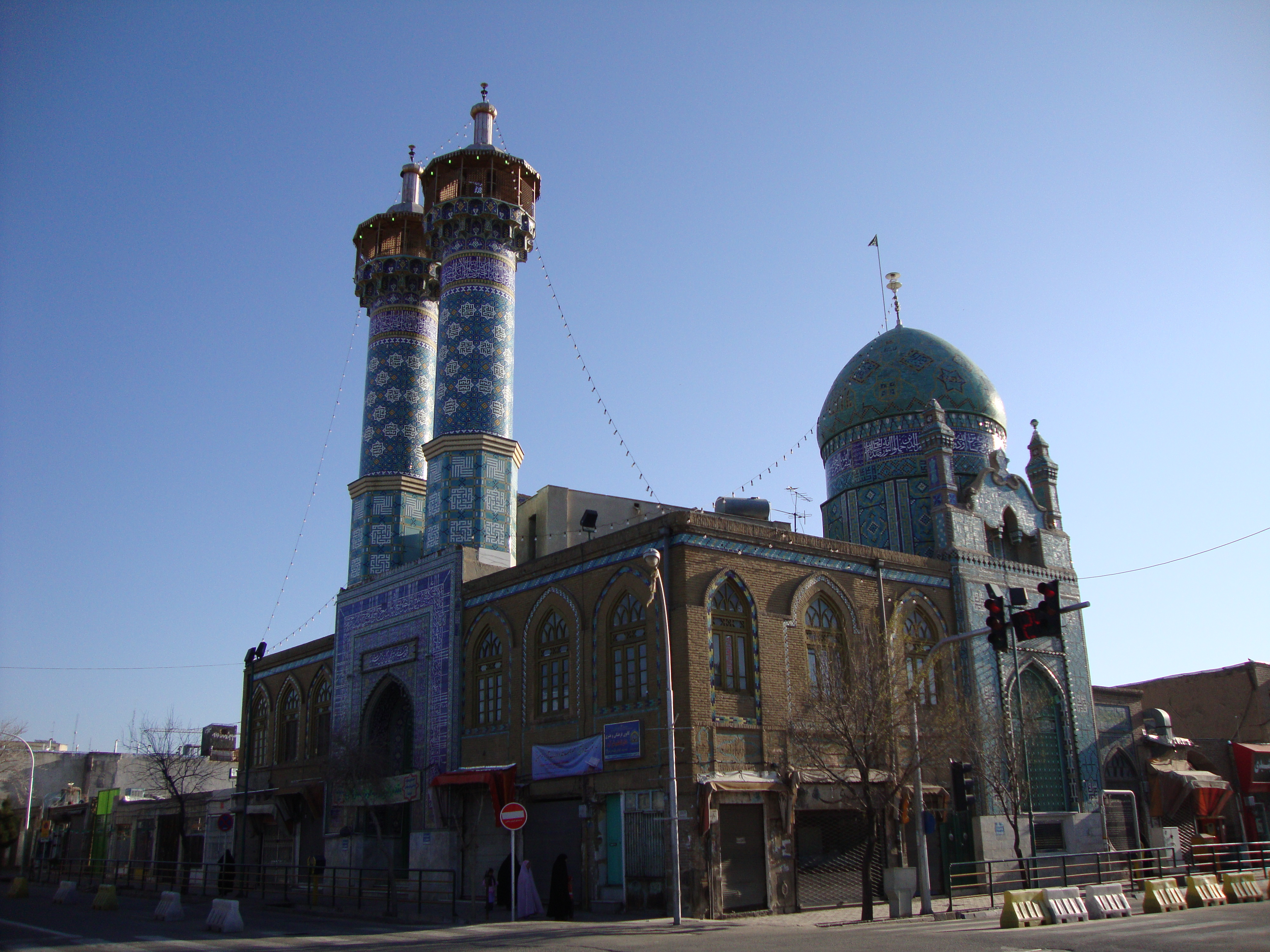
- Yahya Monument, Sabzevar

- Location of Sabzevar County in Razavi Khorasan province (left, pink)

- Location of Razavi Khorasan province in Iran
- Coordinates: 35°57′N 57°31′E
- Country: Iran
- Province: Razavi Khorasan
- Capital: Sabzevar
- Districts: Central, Rud Ab

Area
  - Total: 7,217 km^{2} (2,786 sq mi)

Population (2016)
  - Total: 306,310
  - Density: 42.44/km^{2} (109.9/sq mi)
- Time zone: UTC+3:30 (IRST)

Sabzevar County (Persian: شهرستان سبزوار) is in Razavi Khorasan province, Iran. Its capital is the city of Sabzevar.

== History ==
In 2007, Joghatai and Joveyn Districts were separated from the county in the establishment of Joghatai and Joveyn Counties, respectively. In 2010, Khoshab District was likewise separated to establish Khoshab County.

In 2012, Davarzan District was separated in the establishment of Davarzan County. In 2020, Sheshtamad District was separated to establish Sheshtamad County.

== Demographics ==
=== Population ===
At the time of the 2006 National Census, the county's population was 429,187, in 116,891 households. The following census in 2011 counted 319,893 people in 98,581 households, The 2016 census measured the population of the county as 306,310 in 95,553 households.

=== Administrative divisions ===
Sabzevar County's population history and administrative structure over three consecutive censuses are shown in the following table.

Sabzevar County Population
| Administrative Divisions | 2006 | 2011 | 2016 |
|---|---|---|---|
| Central District | 233,744 | 256,869 | 268,642 |
| Karrab RD | 3,335 | 2,511 | 1,980 |
| Qasabeh-ye Gharbi RD | 8,701 | 9,585 | 9,398 |
| Qasabeh-ye Sharqi RD | 7,664 | 7,513 | 7,813 |
| Robat RD | 5,872 | 5,703 | 5,751 |
| Sabzevar (city) | 208,172 | 231,557 | 243,700 |
| Davarzan District (Note: Transferred to Davarzan County) | 22,406 | 21,309 | |
| Bashtin RD | 5,424 | 4,852 | |
| Kah RD | 8,531 | 8,213 | |
| Mazinan RD | 6,064 | 5,542 | |
| Davarzan (city) | 2,387 | 2,702 | |
| Joghatai District (Note: Transferred to Joghatai County) | 45,970 | | |
| Dasturan RD | 5,473 | | |
| Joghatai RD | 10,374 | | |
| Miyan Joveyn RD | 11,560 | | |
| Pain Joveyn RD | 12,536 | | |
| Joghatai (city) | 6,027 | | |
| Joveyn District (Note: Transferred to Joveyn County) | 49,583 | | |
| Bala Joveyn RD | 17,090 | | |
| Hokmabad RD | 15,094 | | |
| Pirakuh RD | 5,377 | | |
| Neqab (city) | 12,022 | | |
| Khoshab District (Note: Transferred to Khoshab County) | 37,600 | | |
| Darreh Yam RD (Note: Renamed Meshkan Rural District) | 10,607 | | |
| Robat-e Jaz RD | 3,221 | | |
| Soltanabad RD | 7,129 | | |
| Tabas RD | 11,822 | | |
| Soltanabad (city) | 4,821 | | |
| Rud Ab District | 14,611 | 13,515 | 13,406 |
| Frughan RD | 4,151 | 3,877 | 3,758 |
| Khvashod RD | 4,779 | 3,953 | 4,171 |
| Kuh Hamayi RD | 2,211 | 1,643 | 1,449 |
| Rud Ab (city) (Note: Formerly the village of Qaleh Now-e Rud Ab) | 3,470 | 4,042 | 4,028 |
| Sheshtamad District (Note: Transferred to Sheshtamad County after the 2016 census) | 25,273 | 28,082 | 24,261 |
| Beyhaq RD | 7,417 | 7,826 | 6,871 |
| Rob-e Shamat RD | 4,663 | 4,806 | 4,385 |
| Shamkan RD | 5,947 | 6,520 | 5,771 |
| Takab-e Kuhmish RD | 5,000 | 4,758 | 4,126 |
| Sheshtomad (city) | 2,246 | 4,172 | 3,108 |
| Total | 429,187 | 319,893 | 306,310 |
RD = Rural District

== Notable people ==
- Ali Shariati, intellectual

== See also ==
Media related to Sabzevar County at Wikimedia Commons
