= Allahabad, Joghatai =

Village in Razavi Khorasan province, Iran

Allahabad Persian: الله اباد
- Village
- Location within Iran
- Coordinates: 36°41′40″N 56°53′14″E
- Country: Iran
- Province: Razavi Khorasan
- County: Joghatai
- District: Central
- Rural District: Dasturan

Population (2016)
  - Total: 598
- Time zone: UTC+3:30 (IRST)

Allahabad (Persian: الله‌آباد) (Note: Also romanized as Allāhābād) is a village in Dasturan Rural District of the Central District in Joghatai County, Razavi Khorasan province, Iran.

== Demographics ==
=== Population ===
At the time of the 2006 National Census, the village's population was 427 in 111 households, when it was in the former Joghatai District of Sabzevar County. The following census in 2011 counted 462 people in 145 households, by which time the district had been separated from the county in the establishment of Joghatai County. The rural district was transferred to the new Central District. The 2016 census measured the population of the village as 598 people in 190 households.
