= Abu Chenari =

Village in Razavi Khorasan province, Iran

Abu Chenari Persian: ابوچناري
- Village
- Location within Iran
- Coordinates: 36°35′05″N 57°07′43″E
- Country: Iran
- Province: Razavi Khorasan
- County: Joghatai
- District: Central
- Rural District: Joghatai

Population (2016)
  - Total: 1,805
- Time zone: UTC+3:30 (IRST)

Abu Chenari (Persian: ابوچناري) (Note: Also romanized as Abū Chenārī) is a village in, and the capital of, Joghatai Rural District of the Central District of Joghatai County, Razavi Khorasan province, Iran.

== Demographics ==
=== Population ===
At the time of the 2006 National Census, the village's population was 1,352 in 308 households, when it was in the former Joghatai District of Sabzevar County. The following census in 2011 counted 1,590 people in 443 households, by which time the district had been separated from the county in the establishment of Joghatai County. The rural district was transferred to the new Central District. The 2016 census measured the population of the village as 1,805 people in 542 households.
