= Seyyedabad-e Akrad =

Village in Razavi Khorasan province, Iran

Seyyedabad-e Akrad Persian: سيداباداكراد
- Village
- Location within Iran
- Country: Iran
- Province: Razavi Khorasan
- County: Joghatai
- District: Helali
- Rural District: Miyan Joveyn

Population (2016)
  - Total: 297
- Time zone: UTC+3:30 (IRST)

Seyyedabad-e Akrad (Persian: سيداباداكراد) (Note: Also romanized as Seyyedābād-e Āḵrād; also known as Seyyedābād) is a village in Miyan Joveyn Rural District of Helali District in Joghatai County, Razavi Khorasan province, Iran.

== Demographics ==
=== Population ===
At the time of the 2006 National Census, the village's population was 373 in 80 households, when it was in the former Joghatai District of Sabzevar County. The following census in 2011 counted 309 people in 84 households, by which time the district had been separated from the county in the establishment of Joghatai County. The rural district was transferred to the new Helali District. The 2016 census measured the population of the village as 297 people in 85 households.
