= Kohneh, Razavi Khorasan =

Village in Razavi Khorasan province, Iran

Kohneh Persian: كَهنه
- Village
- Location within Iran
- Coordinates: 36°38′50″N 56°53′33″E
- Country: Iran
- Province: Razavi Khorasan
- County: Joghatai
- District: Central
- Rural District: Dasturan

Population (2016)
  - Total: 902
- Time zone: UTC+3:30 (IRST)

Kohneh (Persian: كَهنه) (Note: Also romanized as Kāhneh) is a village in Dasturan Rural District of the Central District in Joghatai County, Razavi Khorasan province, Iran.

== Demographics ==
=== Population ===
At the time of the 2006 National Census, the village's population was 1,272 in 317 households, when it was in the former Joghatai District of Sabzevar County. The following census in 2011 counted 1,091 people in 341 households, by which time the district had been separated from the county in the establishment of Joghatai County. The rural district was transferred to the new Central District. The 2016 census measured the population of the village as 902 people in 278 households, the most populous in its rural district.
