= Gaft =

Gaft may refer to:

Villages in Razavi Khorasan Province, Iran

- Gaft, Joghatai
- Gaft, Sabzevar
- Mohammadabad-e Gaft

Other

- Valentin Gaft (1935–2020), Russian actor
