= Zamand =

Village in Razavi Khorasan province, Iran

Zamand Persian: زمند
- Village
- Location within Iran
- Coordinates: 36°34′08″N 57°04′35″E
- Country: Iran
- Province: Razavi Khorasan
- County: Joghatai
- District: Central
- Rural District: Joghatai

Population (2016)
  - Total: 628
- Time zone: UTC+3:30 (IRST)

Zamand (Persian: زمند) is a village in Joghatai Rural District of the Central District in Joghatai County, Razavi Khorasan province, Iran.

== Demographics ==
=== Population ===
At the time of the 2006 National Census, the village's population was 1,310 in 320 households, when it was in the former Joghatai District of Sabzevar County. The following census in 2011 counted 751 people in 208 households, by which time the district had been separated from the county in the establishment of Joghatai County. The rural district was transferred to the new Central District. The 2016 census measured the population of the village as 628 people in 208 households.
