= Rah Chaman =

Village in Razavi Khorasan province, Iran

Rah Chaman Persian: راه چمن
- Village
- Location within Iran
- Coordinates: 36°47′20″N 56°59′14″E
- Country: Iran
- Province: Razavi Khorasan
- County: Joghatai
- District: Helali
- Rural District: Miyan Joveyn

Population (2016)
  - Total: 1,332
- Time zone: UTC+3:30 (IRST)

Rah Chaman (Persian: راه چمن) (Note: Also romanized as Rāh Chaman) is a village in Miyan Joveyn Rural District of Helali District in Joghatai County, Razavi Khorasan province, Iran.

== Demographics ==
=== Population ===
At the time of the 2006 National Census, the village's population was 1,372 in 368 households, when it was in the former Joghatai District of Sabzevar County. The following census in 2011 counted 1,326 people in 384 households, by which time the district had been separated from the county in the establishment of Joghatai County. The rural district was transferred to the new Helali District. The 2016 census measured the population of the village as 1,332 people in 416 households.
