= Manidar =

Village in Razavi Khorasan province, Iran

Manidar Persian: منيدر
- Village
- Location within Iran
- Coordinates: 36°36′50″N 56°49′18″E
- Country: Iran
- Province: Razavi Khorasan
- County: Joghatai
- District: Central
- Rural District: Dasturan

Population (2016)
  - Total: 752
- Time zone: UTC+3:30 (IRST)

Manidar (Persian: منيدر) (Note: Also romanized as Maneydar, Manīdar, and Monīdar; also known as Manidir) is a village in Dasturan Rural District of the Central District in Joghatai County, Razavi Khorasan province, Iran.

== Demographics ==
=== Population ===
At the time of the 2006 National Census, the village's population was 942 in 248 households, when it was in the former Joghatai District of Sabzevar County. The following census in 2011 counted 841 people in 246 households, by which time the district had been separated from the county in the establishment of Joghatai County. The rural district was transferred to the new Central District. The 2016 census measured the population of the village as 752 people in 245 households.
