= Barsal, Iran =

Village in Razavi Khorasan province, Iran

Barsal Persian: برسل
- Village
- Location within Iran
- Coordinates: 36°44′02″N 56°59′02″E
- Country: Iran
- Province: Razavi Khorasan
- County: Joghatai
- District: Central
- Rural District: Dasturan

Population (2016)
  - Total: 0
- Time zone: UTC+3:30 (IRST)

Barsal (Persian: برسل) (Note: Also known as Barsil, also romanized as Barsīl) is a village in Dasturan Rural District of the Central District in Joghatai County, Razavi Khorasan province, Iran.

== Demographics ==
=== Population ===
At the time of the 2006 National Census, the village's population was 13 in six households, when it was in the former Joghatai District of Sabzevar County. The village did not appear in the following census of 2011, by which time the district had been separated from the county in the establishment of Joghatai County. The rural district was transferred to the new Central District. The 2016 census measured the population of the village as zero.
