= Deh-e Emam, Razavi Khorasan =

Village in Razavi Khorasan province, Iran

Deh-e Emam Persian: ده امام
- Village
- Location within Iran
- Coordinates: 36°47′50″N 57°02′04″E
- Country: Iran
- Province: Razavi Khorasan
- County: Joghatai
- District: Helali
- Rural District: Miyan Joveyn

Population (2016)
  - Total: 1,661
- Time zone: UTC+3:30 (IRST)

Deh-e Emam (Persian: خداشاه) (Note: Also romanized as Deh Emām and Deh-e Emām; formerly known as Khoda Shah (خداشاه), also romanized as Khodā Shāh, Khodashah, and Khodāshāh) is a village in Miyan Joveyn Rural District of Helali District in Joghatai County, Razavi Khorasan province, Iran.

== Demographics ==
=== Population ===
At the time of the 2006 National Census, the village's population was 1,753 in 398 households, when it was in the former Joghatai District of Sabzevar County. The following census in 2011 counted 1,850 people in 459 households, by which time the district had been separated from the county in the establishment of Joghatai County. The rural district was transferred to the new Helali District. The 2016 census measured the population of the village as 1,661 people in 503 households.
