= Shahrestanak, Joghatai =

Village in Razavi Khorasan province, Iran

Shahrestanak Persian: شهرستانك
- Village
- Location within Iran
- Coordinates: 36°42′25″N 57°10′07″E
- Country: Iran
- Province: Razavi Khorasan
- County: Joghatai
- District: Central
- Rural District: Joghatai

Population (2016)
  - Total: 2,156
- Time zone: UTC+3:30 (IRST)

Shahrestanak (Persian: شهرستانك) (Note: Also romanized as Shahrestānak; also known as Shahrestāneh and Shahristāneh) is a village in Joghatai Rural District of the Central District in Joghatai County, Razavi Khorasan province, Iran.

== Demographics ==
=== Population ===
At the time of the 2006 National Census, the village's population was 2,210 in 547 households, when it was in the former Joghatai District of Sabzevar County. The following census in 2011 counted 2,176 people in 635 households, by which time the district had been separated from the county in the establishment of Joghatai County. The rural district was transferred to the new Central District. The 2016 census measured the population of the village as 2,156 people in 661 households, the most populous in its rural district.
