= Abbasabad-e Qandi =

Village in Razavi Khorasan province, Iran

Abbasabad-e Qandi Persian: عباس ابادقندي
- Village
- Location within Iran
- Coordinates: 36°46′58″N 57°10′18″E
- Country: Iran
- Province: Razavi Khorasan
- County: Joghatai
- District: Helali
- Rural District: Miyan Joveyn

Population (2016)
  - Total: 581
- Time zone: UTC+3:30 (IRST)

Abbasabad-e Qandi (Persian: عباس‌آباد قندی) (Note: Also romanized as ‘Abbāsābād-e Qandī) is a village in Miyan Joveyn Rural District of Helali District in Joghatai County, Razavi Khorasan province, Iran.

== Demographics ==
=== Population ===
At the time of the 2006 National Census, the village's population was 573 in 125 households, when it was in the former Joghatai District of Sabzevar County. The following census in 2011 counted 601 people in 158 households, by which time the district had been separated from the county in the establishment of Joghatai County. The rural district was transferred to the new Helali District. The 2016 census measured the population of the village as 581 people in 173 households.
