= Javar Tan =

Village in Razavi Khorasan province, Iran

Javar Tan Persian: جاورتن
- Village
- Location within Iran
- Coordinates: 36°40′52″N 56°47′21″E
- Country: Iran
- Province: Razavi Khorasan
- County: Joghatai
- District: Central
- Rural District: Dasturan

Population (2016)
  - Total: 163
- Time zone: UTC+3:30 (IRST)

Javar Tan (Persian: جاورتن) (Note: Also romanized as Jāvar Tan and Javer Tan; also known as Jāyartan and Jūratān) is a village in Dasturan Rural District of the Central District in Joghatai County, Razavi Khorasan province, Iran.

== Demographics ==
=== Population ===
At the time of the 2006 National Census, the village's population was 172 in 50 households, when it was in the former Joghatai District of Sabzevar County. The following census in 2011 counted 173 people in 52 households, by which time the district had been separated from the county in the establishment of Joghatai County. The rural district was transferred to the new Central District. The 2016 census measured the population of the village as 163 people in 62 households.
