= Farimaneh =

Village in Razavi Khorasan province, Iran

Farimaneh Persian: فريمانه
- Village
- Location within Iran
- Coordinates: 36°34′04″N 57°06′44″E
- Country: Iran
- Province: Razavi Khorasan
- County: Joghatai
- District: Central
- Rural District: Joghatai

Population (2016)
  - Total: 1,922
- Time zone: UTC+3:30 (IRST)

Farimaneh (Persian: فريمانه) (Note: Also romanized as Farīmāneh; also known as Farīmān) is a village in Joghatai Rural District of the Central District in Joghatai County, Razavi Khorasan province, Iran.

== Demographics ==
=== Population ===
At the time of the 2006 National Census, the village's population was 1,636 in 395 households, when it was in the former Joghatai District of Sabzevar County. The following census in 2011 counted 1,790 people in 460 households, by which time the district had been separated from the county in the establishment of Joghatai County. The rural district was transferred to the new Central District. The 2016 census measured the population of the village as 1,922 people in 498 households.
