= Zarqan, Razavi Khorasan =

Village in Razavi Khorasan province, Iran

Zarqan Persian: زرقان
- Village
- Location within Iran
- Coordinates: 36°31′33″N 57°11′08″E
- Country: Iran
- Province: Razavi Khorasan
- County: Joghatai
- District: Central
- Rural District: Joghatai

Area
  - Total: 3.5 km^{2} (1.4 sq mi)

Population (2016)
  - Total: 2,050
  - Density: 590/km^{2} (1,500/sq mi)
- Time zone: UTC+3:30 (IRST)

Zarqan (Persian: زرقان) (Note: Also romanized as Zaraqān and Zarqān; also known as Zarghan and Zirghān) is a village in Joghatai Rural District of the Central District in Joghatai County, Razavi Khorasan province, Iran.

== Demographics ==
=== Population ===
At the time of the 2006 National Census, the village's population was 1,964 in 563 households, when it was in the former Joghatai District of Sabzevar County. The following census in 2011 counted 1,949 people in 621 households, by which time the district had been separated from the county in the establishment of Joghatai County. The rural district was transferred to the new Central District. The 2016 census measured the population of the village as 2,050 people in 683 households.
