= Kalateh-ye Mir Abbas =

Village in Razavi Khorasan province, Iran

Kalateh-ye Mir Abbas Persian: كلاته ميرعباس
- Village
- Country: Iran
- Province: Razavi Khorasan
- County: Joghatai
- District: Central
- Rural District: Joghatai

Population (2016)
  - Total: 0
- Time zone: UTC+3:30 (IRST)

Kalateh-ye Mir Abbas (Persian: كلاته مير عباس) (Note: Also romanized as Kalāteh-ye Mīr ‘Abbās and Kalāteh-ye Mīrʿabbās) is a village in Joghatai Rural District of the Central District in Joghatai County, Razavi Khorasan province, Iran.

== Demographics ==
=== Population ===
At the time of the 2006 National Census, the village's population was 16 in four households, when it was in the former Joghatai District of Sabzevar County. The following census in 2011 counted a population below the reporting threshold, by which time the district had been separated from the county in the establishment of Joghatai County. The rural district was transferred to the new Central District. The 2016 census measured the population of the village as zero.
