= Dasturan =

Village in Razavi Khorasan province, Iran

Dasturan Persian: دستوران
- Village
- Location within Iran
- Coordinates: 36°38′42″N 56°57′55″E
- Country: Iran
- Province: Razavi Khorasan
- County: Joghatai
- District: Central
- Rural District: Dasturan

Population (2016)
  - Total: 899
- Time zone: UTC+3:30 (IRST)

Dasturan (Persian: دستوران) (Note: Also romanized as Dastūrān) is a village in, and the capital of, Dasturan Rural District in the Central District of Joghatai County, Razavi Khorasan province, Iran.

== Demographics ==
=== Population ===
At the time of the 2006 National Census, the village's population was 846 in 228 households, when it was in the former Joghatai District of Sabzevar County. The following census in 2011 counted 915 people in 290 households, by which time the district had been separated from the county in the establishment of Joghatai County. The rural district was transferred to the new Central District. The 2016 census measured the population of the village as 899 people in 288 households.
