= Kalateh-ye Rezaiyeh =

Village in Razavi Khorasan province, Iran

Kalateh-ye Rezaiyeh Persian: كلاته رضائيه
- Village
- Country: Iran
- Province: Razavi Khorasan
- County: Joghatai
- District: Helali
- Rural District: Miyan Joveyn

Population (2016)
  - Total: 0
- Time zone: UTC+3:30 (IRST)

Kalateh-ye Rezaiyeh (Persian: كلاته رضائيه) (Note: Also romanized as Kalāteh-ye Rez̤āīyeh) is a village in Miyan Joveyn Rural District of Helali District in Joghatai County, Razavi Khorasan province, Iran.

== Demographics ==
=== Population ===
At the time of the 2006 National Census, the village's population was 31 in five households, when it was in the former Joghatai District of Sabzevar County. The village did not appear in the following census of 2011, by which time the district had been separated from the county in the establishment of Joghatai County. The rural district was transferred to the new Helali District. The 2016 census measured the population of the village as zero.
