= Farashian =

Village in Razavi Khorasan province, Iran

Farashian Persian: فراشيان
- Village
- Location within Iran
- Coordinates: 36°47′10″N 56°49′40″E
- Country: Iran
- Province: Razavi Khorasan
- County: Joghatai
- District: Helali
- Rural District: Pain Joveyn

Population (2016)
  - Total: 2,276
- Time zone: UTC+3:30 (IRST)

Farashian (Persian: فراشيان) (Note: Also romanized as Farāshīān, Farashiyan, Farrāshīyān, and Farrāshyān; also known as Farasīāh) is a village in, and the capital of, Pain Joveyn Rural District in Helali District of Joghatai County, Razavi Khorasan province, Iran.

== Demographics ==
=== Population ===
At the time of the 2006 National Census, the village's population was 2,020 in 472 households, when it was in the former Joghatai District of Sabzevar County. The following census in 2011 counted 2,249 people in 633 households, by which time the district had been separated from the county in the establishment of Joghatai County. The rural district was transferred to the new Helali District. The 2016 census measured the population of the village as 2,276 people in 678 households.
