= Now Bagh =

Village in Razavi Khorasan province, Iran

Now Bagh Persian: نوباغ
- Village
- Location within Iran
- Coordinates: 36°46′33″N 57°11′36″E
- Country: Iran
- Province: Razavi Khorasan
- County: Joghatai
- District: Helali
- Rural District: Miyan Joveyn

Population (2016)
  - Total: 754
- Time zone: UTC+3:30 (IRST)

Now Bagh (Persian: نوباغ) (Note: Also romanized as Now Bāgh) is a village in Miyan Joveyn Rural District of Helali District in Joghatai County, Razavi Khorasan province, Iran.

== Demographics ==
=== Population ===
At the time of the 2006 National Census, the village's population was 778 in 167 households, when it was in the former Joghatai District of Sabzevar County. The following census in 2011 counted 780 people in 190 households, by which time the district had been separated from the county in the establishment of Joghatai County. The rural district was transferred to the new Helali District. The 2016 census measured the population of the village as 754 people in 229 households.
