= Feshanjerd =

Village in Razavi Khorasan province, Iran

Feshanjerd Persian: فشانجرد
- Village
- Location within Iran
- Coordinates: 36°47′38″N 57°08′13″E
- Country: Iran
- Province: Razavi Khorasan
- County: Joghatai
- District: Helali
- Rural District: Miyan Joveyn

Population (2016)
  - Total: 1,038
- Time zone: UTC+3:30 (IRST)

Feshanjerd (Persian: فشانجرد) (Note: Also romanized as Feshānjerd; also known as Gūrī Feshānjerd) is a village in Miyan Joveyn Rural District of Helali District in Joghatai County, Razavi Khorasan province, Iran.

== Demographics ==
=== Population ===
At the time of the 2006 National Census, the village's population was 888 in 227 households, when it was in the former Joghatai District of Sabzevar County. The following census in 2011 counted 1,000 people in 287 households, by which time the district had been separated from the county in the establishment of Joghatai County. The rural district was transferred to the new Helali District. The 2016 census measured the population of the village as 1,038 people in 334 households.
