= Hatiteh, Joghatai =

Village in Razavi Khorasan province, Iran

Hatiteh Persian: حطيطه
- Village
- Location within Iran
- Coordinates: 36°33′57″N 57°11′46″E
- Country: Iran
- Province: Razavi Khorasan
- County: Joghatai
- District: Central
- Rural District: Joghatai

Population (2016)
  - Total: 459
- Time zone: UTC+3:30 (IRST)

Hatiteh (Persian: حطيطه) (Note: Also romanized as Ḩaţīţeh; also known as Atitah and Atīteh) is a village in Joghatai Rural District of the Central District in Joghatai County, Razavi Khorasan province, Iran.

== Demographics ==
=== Population ===
At the time of the 2006 National Census, the village's population was 381 in 102 households, when it was in the former Joghatai District of Sabzevar County. The following census in 2011 counted 379 people in 113 households, by which time the district had been separated from the county in the establishment of Joghatai County. The rural district was transferred to the new Central District. The 2016 census measured the population of the village as 459 people in 128 households.
