= Khalilabad, Joghatai =

Village in Razavi Khorasan province, Iran

Khalilabad Persian: خليل اباد
- Village
- Location within Iran
- Coordinates: 36°45′35″N 56°44′11″E
- Country: Iran
- Province: Razavi Khorasan
- County: Joghatai
- District: Helali
- Rural District: Pain Joveyn

Population (2016)
  - Total: 296
- Time zone: UTC+3:30 (IRST)

Khalilabad (Persian: خليل اباد) (Note: Also romanized as Khalīlābād) is a village in Pain Joveyn Rural District of Helali District in Joghatai County, Razavi Khorasan province, Iran.

== Demographics ==
=== Population ===
At the time of the 2006 National Census, the village's population was 351 in 85 households, when it was in the former Joghatai District of Sabzevar County. The following census in 2011 counted 282 people in 84 households, by which time the district had been separated from the county in the establishment of Joghatai County. The rural district was transferred to the new Helali District. The 2016 census measured the population of the village as 296 people in 102 households.
