= Shafiabad, Joghatai =

Village in Razavi Khorasan province, Iran

Shafiabad Persian: شفيع اباد
- Village
- Location within Iran
- Coordinates: 36°43′11″N 56°37′21″E
- Country: Iran
- Province: Razavi Khorasan
- County: Joghatai
- District: Helali
- Rural District: Pain Joveyn

Population (2016)
  - Total: 189
- Time zone: UTC+3:30 (IRST)

Shafiabad (Persian: شفيع اباد) (Note: Also romanized as Shafī‘ābād; also known as Safī‘ābād and Sharīfābād) is a village in Pain Joveyn Rural District of Helali District in Joghatai County, Razavi Khorasan province, Iran.

== Demographics ==
=== Population ===
At the time of the 2006 National Census, the village's population was 274 in 79 households, when it was in the former Joghatai District of Sabzevar County. The following census in 2011 counted 201 people in 66 households, by which time the district had been separated from the county in the establishment of Joghatai County. The rural district was transferred to the new Helali District. The 2016 census measured the population of the village as 189 people in 65 households.
