= Shadman, Razavi Khorasan =

Village in Razavi Khorasan province, Iran

Shadman Persian: شادمان
- Village
- Location within Iran
- Coordinates: 36°39′19″N 56°45′44″E
- Country: Iran
- Province: Razavi Khorasan
- County: Joghatai
- District: Central
- Rural District: Dasturan

Population (2016)
  - Total: 63
- Time zone: UTC+3:30 (IRST)

Shadman (Persian: شادمان) (Note: Also romanized as Shādmān) is a village in Dasturan Rural District of the Central District in Joghatai County, Razavi Khorasan province, Iran.

== Demographics ==
=== Population ===
At the time of the 2006 National Census, the village's population was 77 in 22 households, when it was in the former Joghatai District of Sabzevar County. The following census in 2011 counted 57 people in 16 households, by which time the district had been separated from the county in the establishment of Joghatai County. The rural district was transferred to the new Central District. The 2016 census measured the population of the village as 63 people in 22 households.
