= Qaleh-ye Now, Joghatai =

Village in Razavi Khorasan province, Iran

Qaleh-ye Now Persian: قلعه نو
- Village
- Location within Iran
- Coordinates: 36°43′21″N 56°38′09″E
- Country: Iran
- Province: Razavi Khorasan
- County: Joghatai
- District: Helali
- Rural District: Pain Joveyn

Population (2016)
  - Total: 595
- Time zone: UTC+3:30 (IRST)

Qaleh-ye Now (Persian: قلعه نو) (Note: Also romanized as Qal`eh-ye Now; also known as Qalehno) is a village in Pain Joveyn Rural District of Helali District in Joghatai County, Razavi Khorasan province, Iran.

== Demographics ==
=== Population ===
At the time of the 2006 National Census, the village's population was 757 in 201 households, when it was in the former Joghatai District of Sabzevar County. The following census in 2011 counted 678 people in 226 households, by which time the district had been separated from the county in the establishment of Joghatai County. The rural district was transferred to the new Helali District. The 2016 census measured the population of the village as 595 people in 217 households.
