= Istin =

Istin may refer to:

- Istin, Razavi Khorasan
- Istin, South Khorasan
- A proprietary name for amlodipine
