= Shadman =

Shadman or Shademan (Persian: شادمان) may refer to:

- Shadman (name), list of people with the name
- Shadman, Qazvin, a village in Iran
- Shadman, Razavi Khorasan, a village in Iran
- Shadman, a neighbourhood in Pakistan
- Shademan, Kermanshah, a village in Iran
