= Khosrow Shir =

Village in Razavi Khorasan province, Iran

Khosrow Shir Persian: خسروشير
- Village
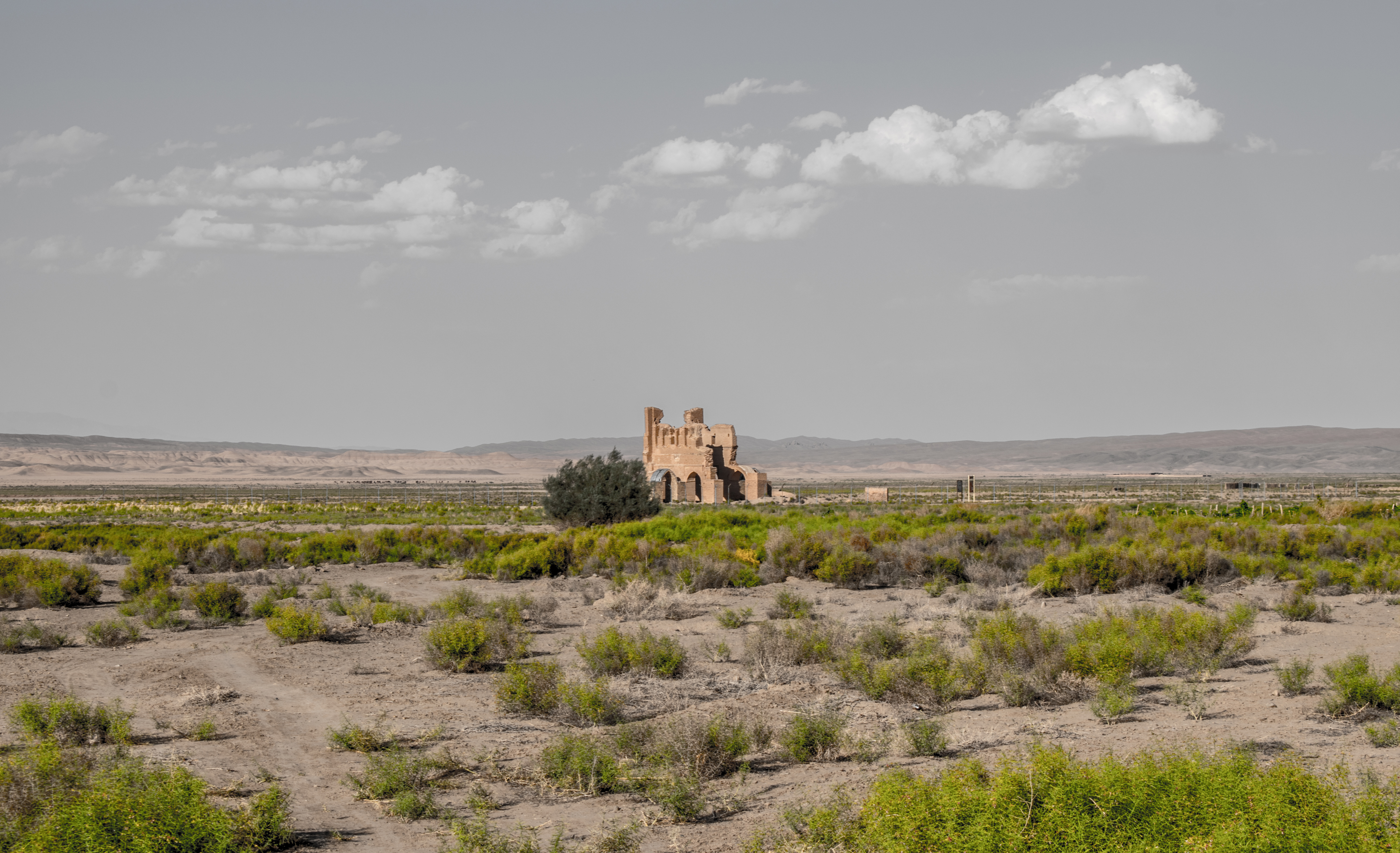
- Remnants of Khosrow Shir Mosque

- Location within Iran
- Coordinates: 36°47′11″N 57°09′39″E
- Country: Iran
- Province: Razavi Khorasan
- County: Joghatai
- District: Helali
- Rural District: Miyan Joveyn

Population (2016)
  - Total: 440
- Time zone: UTC+3:30 (IRST)

Khosrow Shir (Persian: خسروشير) (Note: Also romanized as Khosrow Shīr; also known as Khusroshir) is a village in Miyan Joveyn Rural District of Helali District in Joghatai County, Razavi Khorasan province, Iran.

== Demographics ==
=== Population ===
At the time of the 2006 National Census, the village's population was 384 in 100 households, when it was in the former Joghatai District of Sabzevar County. The following census in 2011 counted 492 people in 137 households, by which time the district had been separated from the county in the establishment of Joghatai County. The rural district was transferred to the new Helali District. The 2016 census measured the population of the village as 440 people in 150 households.
