= Abuyesan =

Village in Razavi Khorasan province, Iran

Abuyesan Persian: ابويسان
- Village
- Location within Iran
- Coordinates: 36°47′04″N 57°00′44″E
- Country: Iran
- Province: Razavi Khorasan
- County: Joghatai
- District: Helali
- Rural District: Miyan Joveyn

Population (2016)
  - Total: 697
- Time zone: UTC+3:30 (IRST)

Abuyesan (Persian: ابويسان) (Note: Also romanized as Abaveysān, Abavisan, Abavīsān, Abūyesān, and Abveysān; also known as Aboo Besan, Abū Nesyān, and Istin) is a village in Miyan Joveyn Rural District of Helali District in Joghatai County, Razavi Khorasan province, Iran.

== Demographics ==
=== Population ===
At the time of the 2006 National Census, the village's population was 739 in 185 households, when it was in the former Joghatai District of Sabzevar County. The following census in 2011 counted 649 people in 196 households, by which time the district had been separated from the county in the establishment of Joghatai County. The rural district was transferred to the new Helali District. The 2016 census measured the population of the village as 697 people in 220 households.
