= Azadvar =

Village in Razavi Khorasan province, Iran

Azadvar Persian: ازادوار
- Village
- Location within Iran
- Coordinates: 36°44′43″N 56°43′11″E
- Country: Iran
- Province: Razavi Khorasan
- County: Joghatai
- District: Helali
- Rural District: Pain Joveyn

Population (2016)
  - Total: 1,442
- Time zone: UTC+3:30 (IRST)

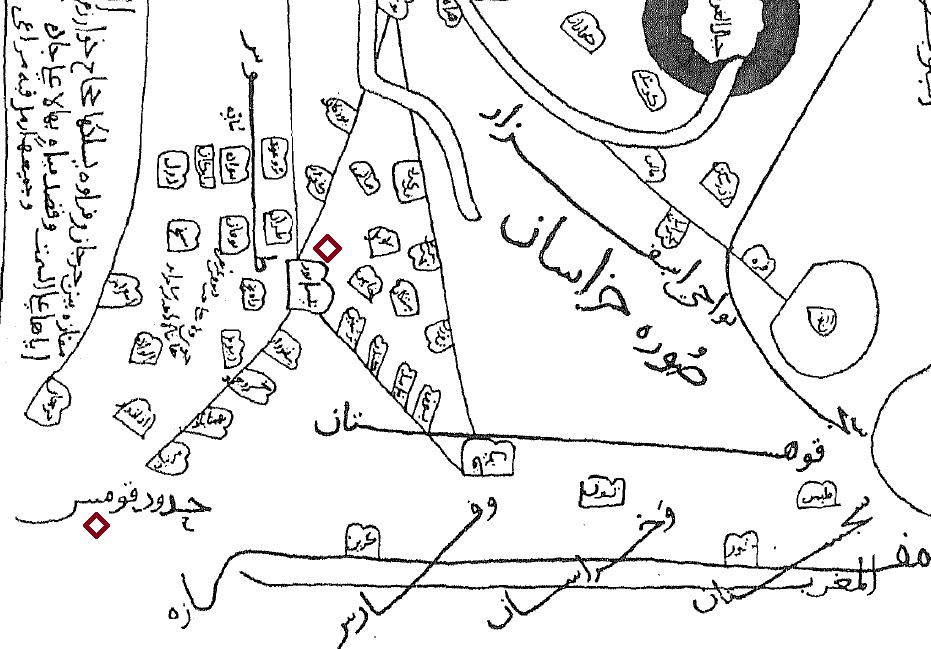
The name Azadvar on the map of Ibn Hawqal in the book Surat al-Ard in the 4th century AH.

Azadvar (Persian: ازادوار) (Note: Also romanized as Āzādvar) is a village in Pain Joveyn Rural District of Helali District in Joghatai County, Razavi Khorasan province, Iran.

== Etymology ==
The naming of Azadvar is mentioned as meaning "the nature and character of free people" and "like the free men"

== History ==
Azadvar was a historic city and the center of the Juyn province, mentioned in historical texts. Its capital is "Azadvar" which, in the early period, is located to the west. Al-Baladhuri and Yaqoubi mention the Juyn province and write:

Uthman ibn Affan gave the province of Basra to Abdullah ibn Amir ibn Kuraiz. Abdullah went to war in Khorasan, where Abu Salim Yazid ibn Yazid al-Jurashi was sent to capture Nishapur. After capturing Nishapur, Abu Salim also took Juyn and captured many slaves.

Shams al-Din al-Maqdisi, in his book Ahsan al-Taqasim fi Ma'rifat al-Aqalim, mentions Azadvar and writes:

Guyan is a vast and fertile village, producing abundant fruits and grains, with clothes being exported from there. It has a road to Gorgan. Its people are devoted to Hadith and literature. The city, Azadvar, is prosperous, populated, and fertile.

Istakhri and Ibn Hawqal refer to Azadvar as one of the cities of Nishapur, along with Buzjan, Zawzan, Termez, and Suzwar. In the book Hudud al-'Alam, Azadvar is described as a small town, stating:

"It lies between the desert and the fertile region, on the road to Gorgan, and is particularly famous for its grapes" (p. 89).

Abu Abdullah, the ruler of Nishapur, writes about the conquest of Azadvar by the Arabs:

"Abdullah ibn Amir acted swiftly and tried hard, soon descending upon Azadvar in Juyn."

Gardizi writes after the conquest of Azadvar by the Arabs:

"Some say Ibn Amir came to Qum and then to Guyan (Juyn), where he stayed before heading to Azadvar, where he made peace."

Yaqut al-Hamawi, who had seen Azadvar himself, writes:

"I saw it, and it is the village of the Khurrah Juyn, belonging to the lands of Nishapur. It is the first village on the traveler's route from Ray, prosperous, populated, with a market and mosques. It has a large Khan, built by a merchant from the Ahl al-Sabil, and many scholars are associated with it."

Hamdallah Mustawfi mentions Azadvar as the "village of Azadvar." Lesterange speaks of two communication routes between Bastam (in the Qom province) and Nishapur, writing:

One is a shorter post road running through the desert, passing through Sabzevar; the other is a closer caravan route that passes through the Juyn plain and its settlements, including Azadvar. Old sources and recent studies suggest that the second route must be the Silk Road, which also passed through Azadvar.

According to Gabriel Hanotaux, after the Mongol invasion, Azadvar retained its strategic position but did not regain its former prosperity for a long time (Gabriel, 295).

Azadvar was prosperous during the Safavid era, as it was listed alongside other provincial capitals such as Abivard, Nisa, Esfarayen, and Torbat, with its tax revenues being paid to the Beglerbegi of Mashhad. The tax amount was 139 tomans and 3,530 dinars (Bastani Parizi, 193).

According to Mohammad Hassan Ettehad al-Saltaneh, Azadvar lost its prosperity and significance during the Qajar period. He writes that pottery remnants from the 4th century to the Safavid era can be found and examined in Azadvar.

== Demographics ==
=== Population ===
At the time of the 2006 National Census, the village's population was 1,720 in 388 households, when it was in the former Joghatai District of Sabzevar County. The following census in 2011 counted 1,481 people in 453 households, by which time the district had been separated from the county in the establishment of Joghatai County. The rural district was transferred to the new Helali District. The 2016 census measured the population of the village as 1,442 people in 444 households.

The village has a railway station that is counted as a separate abadi in the Iranian census. At the time of the 2006 National Census, the abadi's population was 1,004 in 252 households, when it was in the former Joghatai District of Sabzevar County. The following census in 2011 counted 1,107 people in 294 households, by which time the district had been separated from the county in the establishment of Joghatai County. The rural district was transferred to the new Helali District. The 2016 census measured the population of the abadi as 996 people in 306 households.

== Historical monuments ==
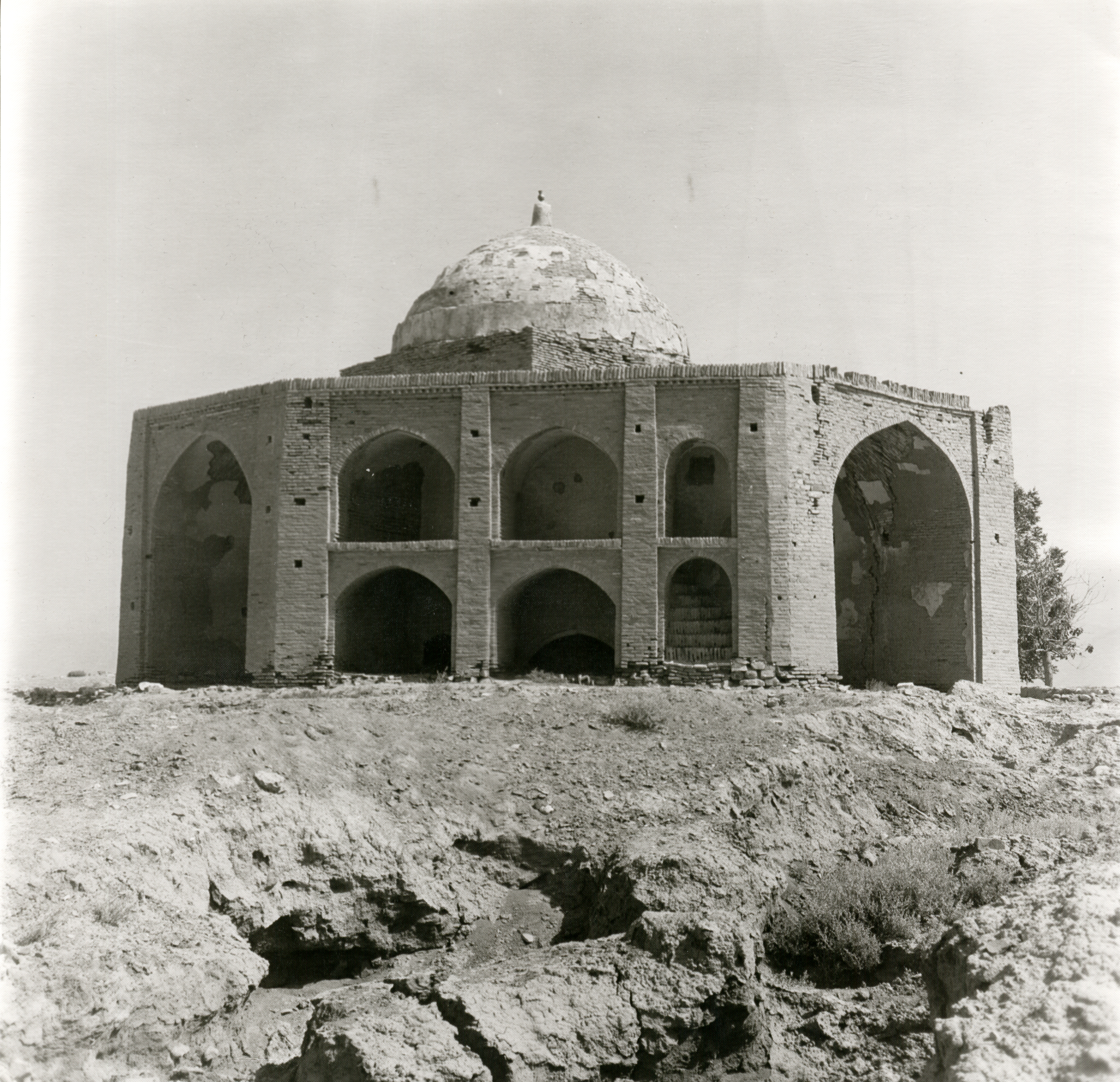
Seyed Hasan Ghaznavi Tomb

The tomb of Hassan Ghaznavi, which features a dome with two-story iwans, is the largest building in Azadvar.
