= Golshanabad, Joghatai =

Village in Razavi Khorasan province, Iran

Golshanabad Persian: گلشن اباد
- Village
- Location within Iran
- Coordinates: 36°48′18″N 56°54′08″E
- Country: Iran
- Province: Razavi Khorasan
- County: Joghatai
- District: Helali
- Rural District: Pain Joveyn

Population (2016)
  - Total: 584
- Time zone: UTC+3:30 (IRST)

Golshanabad (Persian: گلشن اباد) (Note: Also romanized as Golshanābād, formerly known as Qarshamalabad (قرشمال‌آباد)) is a village in Pain Joveyn Rural District of Helali District in Joghatai County, Razavi Khorasan province, Iran.

== Demographics ==
=== Population ===
At the time of the 2006 National Census, the village's population was 576 in 123 households, when it was in the former Joghatai District of Sabzevar County. The following census in 2011 counted 663 people in 166 households, by which time the district had been separated from the county in the establishment of Joghatai County. The rural district was transferred to the new Helali District. The 2016 census measured the population of the village as 584 people in 182 households.
