= Abdolabad-e Akrad =

Village in Razavi Khorasan province, Iran

Abdolabad-e Akrad Persian: عبدل آباد اکراد
- Village
- Location within Iran
- Coordinates: 36°44′35″N 56°39′51″E
- Country: Iran
- Province: Razavi Khorasan
- County: Joghatai
- District: Helali
- Rural District: Pain Joveyn

Population (2016)
  - Total: 261
- Time zone: UTC+3:30 (IRST)

Abdolabad-e Akrad (Persian: عبدل اباد) (Note: Also romanized as ‘Abdolābād-e Āḵrād; formerly known as Abdolabad, also romanized as ‘Abdolābād) is a village in Pain Joveyn Rural District of Helali District in Joghatai County, Razavi Khorasan province, Iran.

== Demographics ==
=== Population ===
At the time of the 2006 National Census, the village's population, as Abdolabad, was 369 in 91 households, when it was in the former Joghatai District of Sabzevar County. The following census in 2011 counted 309 people in 86 households, by which time the district had been separated from the county in the establishment of Joghatai County. The rural district was transferred to the new Helali District. The 2016 census measured the population of the village as 261 people in 87 households, when it was listed as Abdolabad-e Akrad.
