= Khosrow Shir Mosque =

Former mosque in Khosrow Shir, Razavi Khorasan, Iran

- مسجد خسروشیر
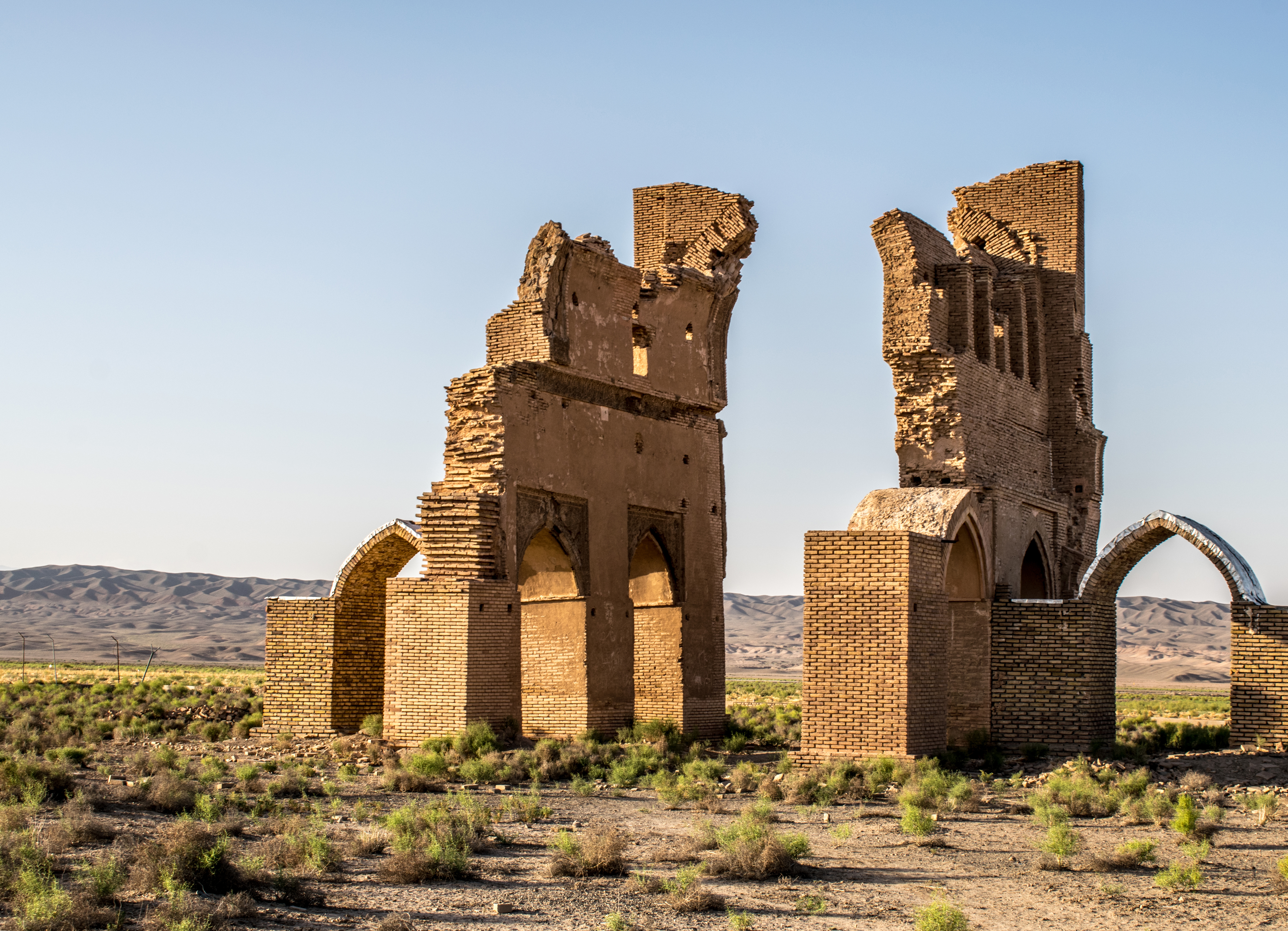
- The mosque ruins in 2018

- Location of the mosque ruins in Iran

Religion
- Affiliation: Sunni Islam (former)
- Ecclesiastical or organizational status: Mosque (former)
- Status: Inactive (ruinous state)

Location
- Location: Khosrow Shir, Razavi Khorasan Province
- Country: Iran
- Interactive map of Khosrow Shir Mosque
- Coordinates: 36°47′25″N 57°10′8″E

Architecture
- Type: Mosque architecture
- Style: Ilkhanid; Seljuk
- Completed: 14th century

Specifications
- Dome: One (maybe more)
- Materials: Bricks; plaster

Iran National Heritage List
- Official name: Khosrow Shir Mosque
- Type: Built
- Designated: 18 August 1998
- Reference no.: 2093
- Conservation organization: Cultural Heritage, Handicrafts and Tourism Organization of Iran

The Khosrow Shir Mosque (Persian: مسجد خسروشیر; Arabic: مسجد خسرو شير) is a former Sunni mosque, now in ruins, located in Khosrow Shir, in the province of Razavi Khorasan, Iran. The mosque was completed in the 14th century, during the Seljuq era, and its architectural style, a double-veranda, shares similarities with the Firuzabad Mosque.

The mosque was added to the Iran National Heritage List on 18 August 1998, administered by the Cultural Heritage, Handicrafts and Tourism Organization of Iran.

== See also ==
- Islam in Iran
- List of mosques in Iran

== Gallery ==
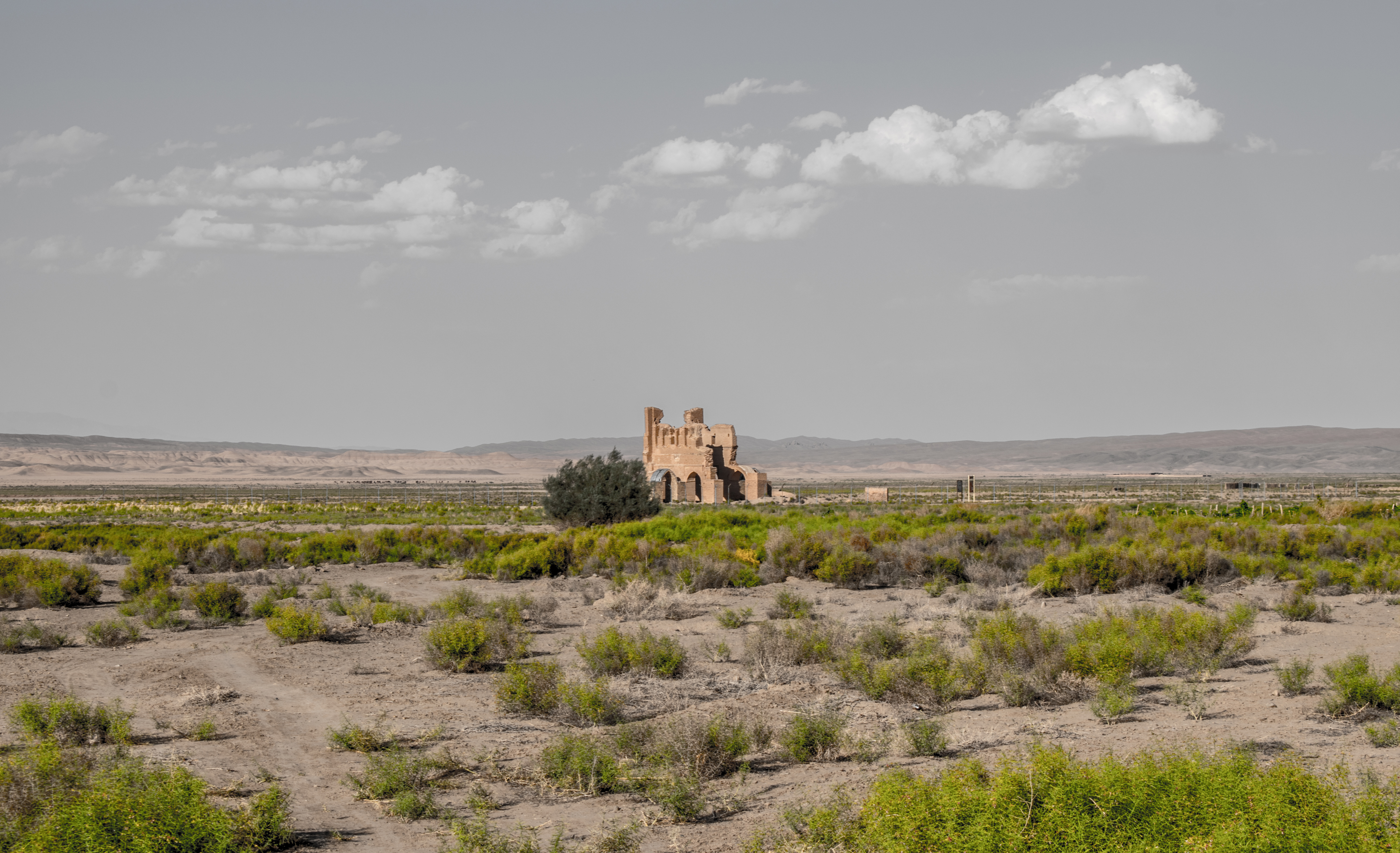

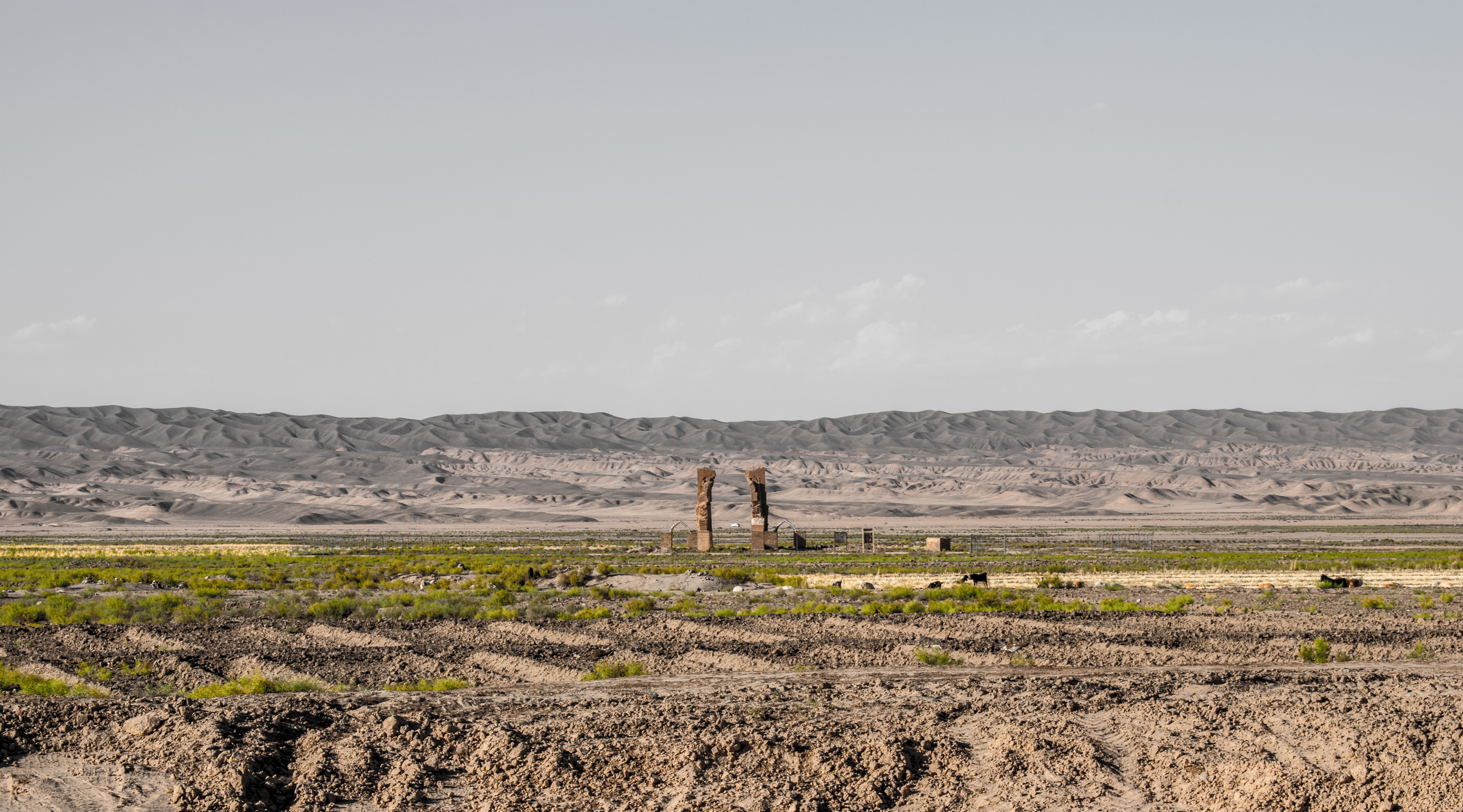

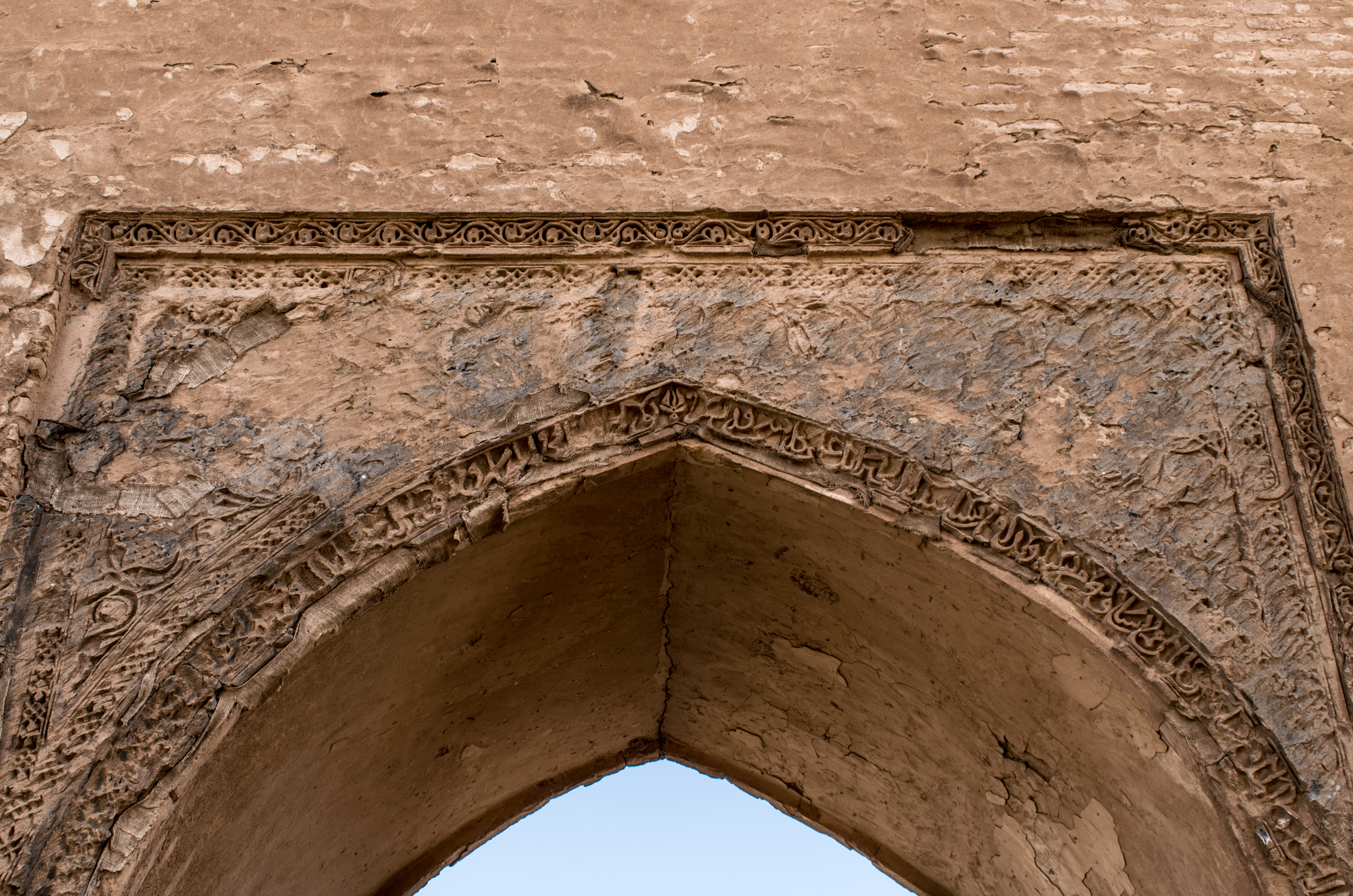

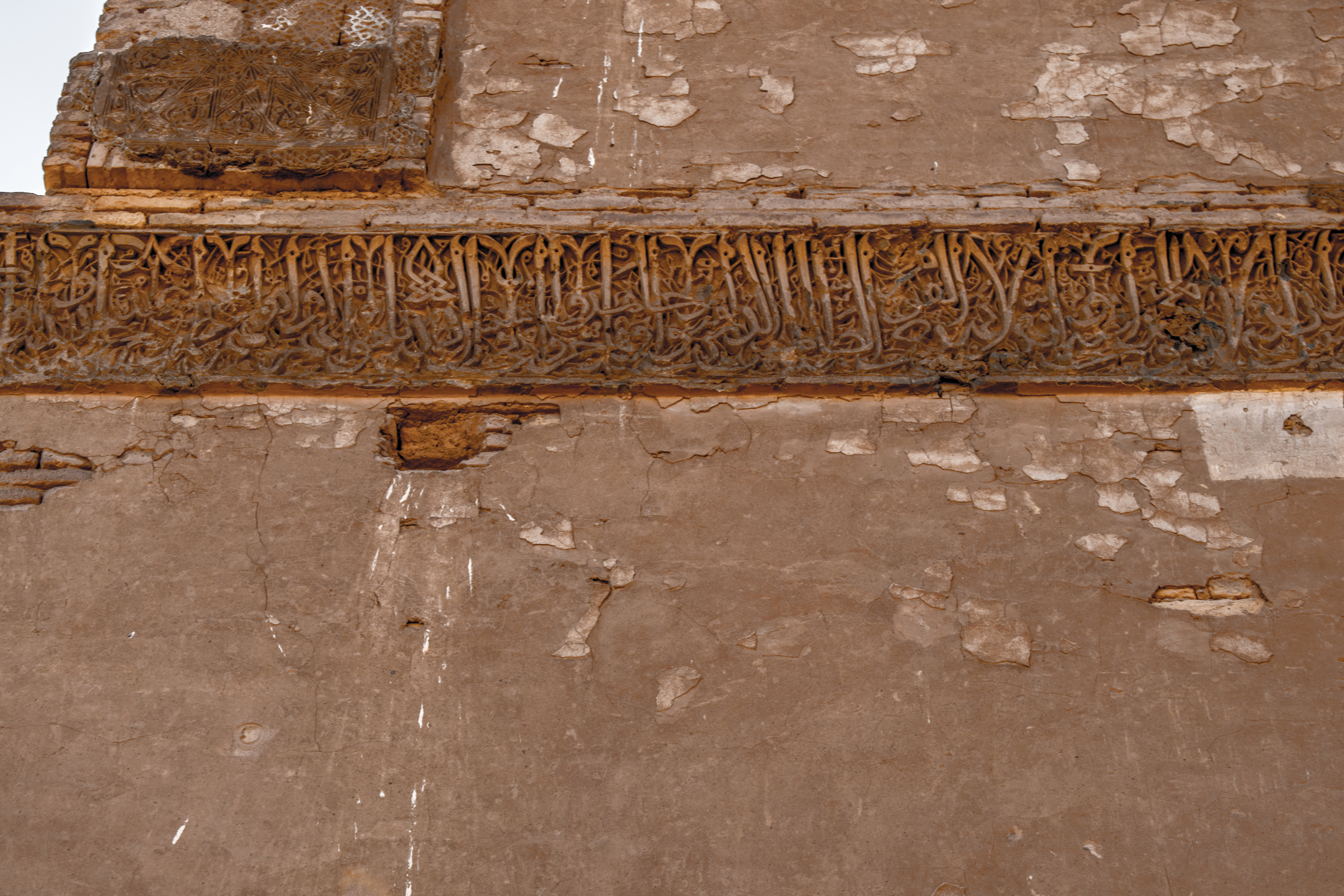

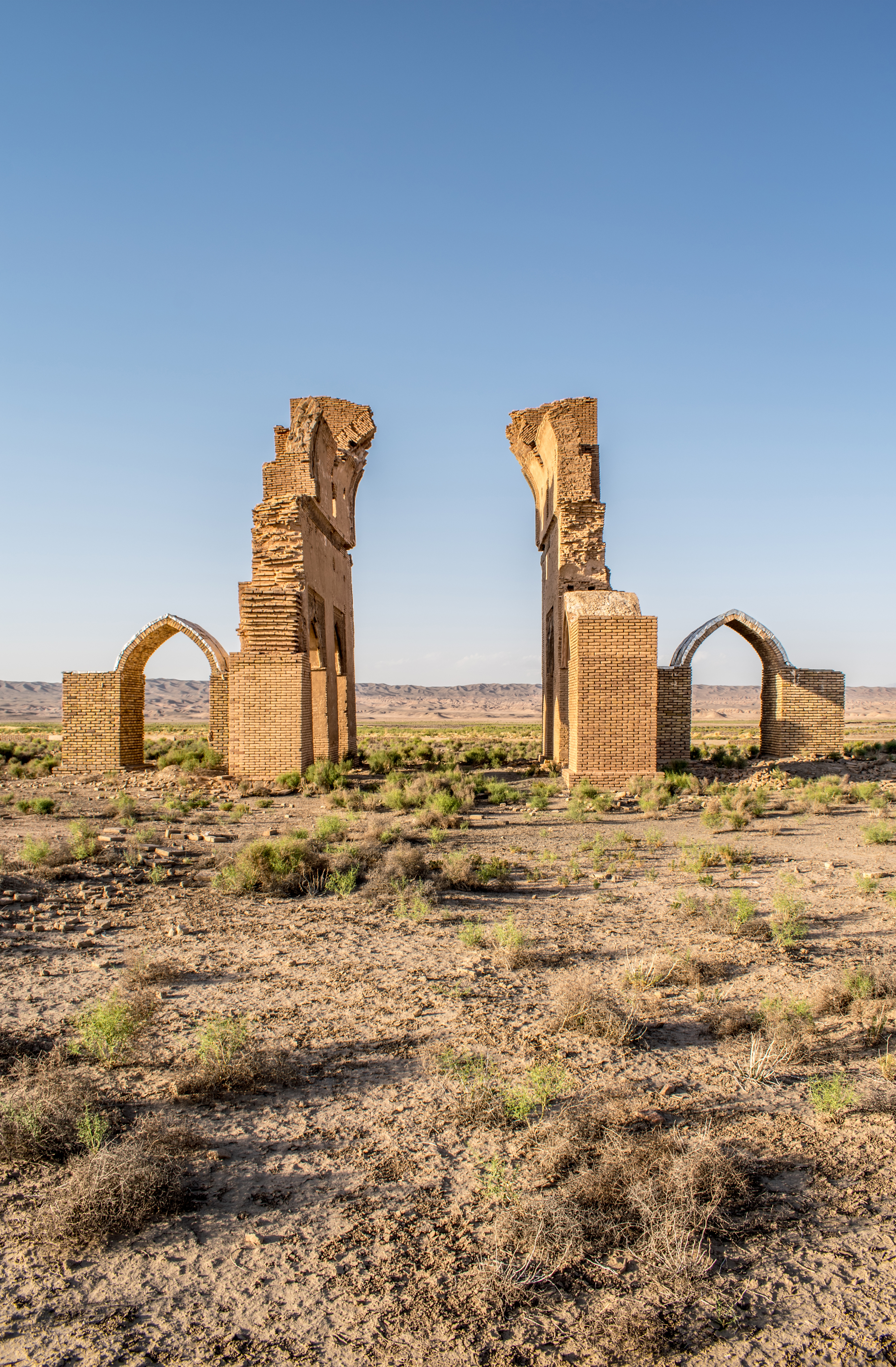

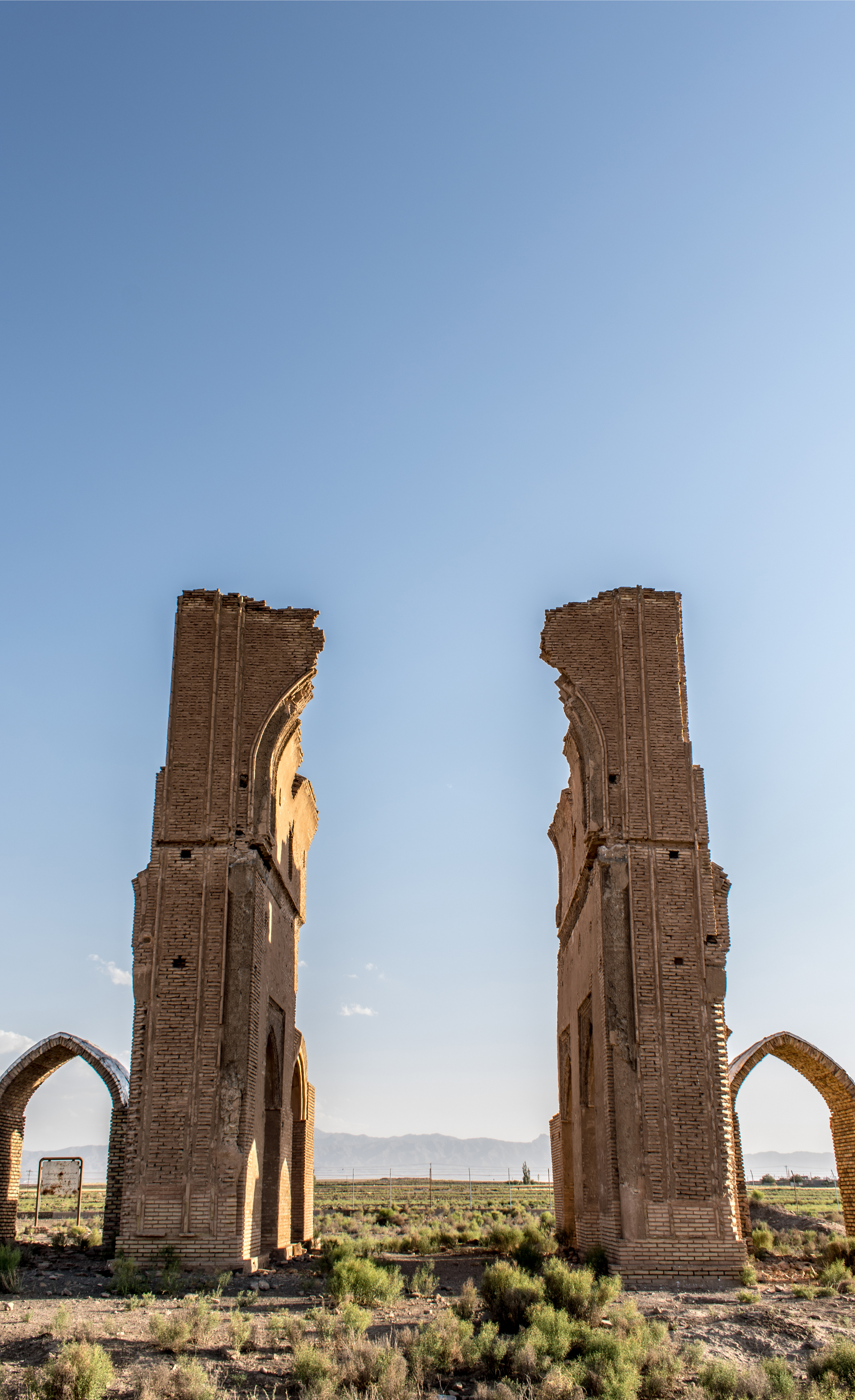

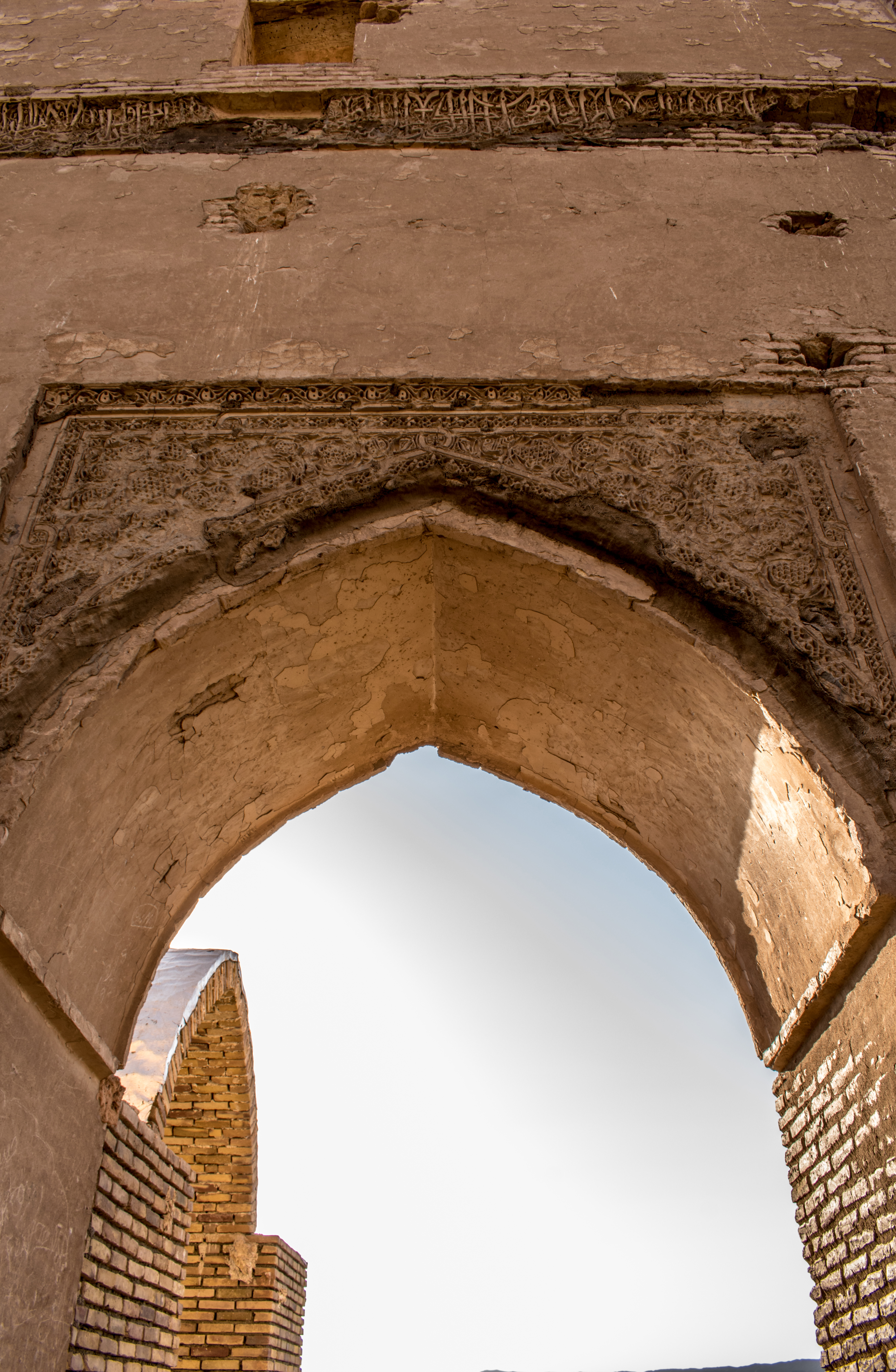

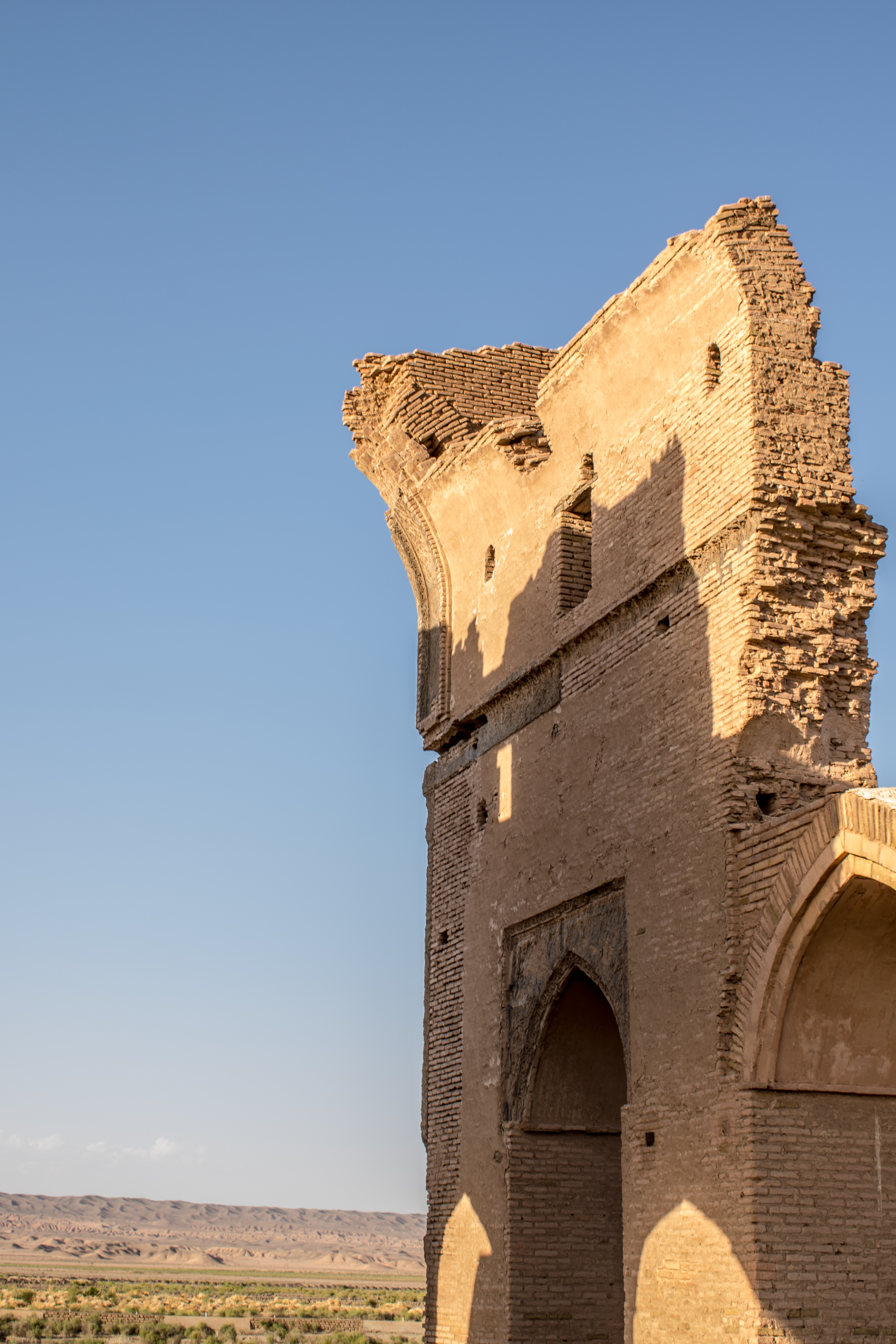
