= Jabale =

Jabale may refer to:

- Mark Jabalé (1933–2025), British Roman Catholic prelate
- Jabale Arabic, the language of Mount Lebanon, a version of Levantine Arabic

== See also ==
- Jabaleh, a village in Iran
