= Shademan =

Shadman may refer to:

- a Mega Man character; see List of Mega Man characters#Robot Masters
- Shadman, Iran (disambiguation), places in Iran
- Shademan Metro Station, in Tehran, Iran
