= Rivadeh =

City in Razavi Khorasan province, Iran

Rivadeh Persian: ريواده
- City
- Location within Iran
- Coordinates: 36°47′33″N 57°06′35″E
- Country: Iran
- Province: Razavi Khorasan
- County: Joghatai
- District: Helali
- Established as a city: 2017

Population (2016)
  - Total: 2,447
- Time zone: UTC+3:30 (IRST)

Rivadeh (Persian: ريواده) (Note: Also romanized as Rīvādeh; also known as Rivadeh-ye Abdolabad (ريواده عبدل آباد), also romanized as Rīvādeh-ye ‘Abdolābād) is a city in, and the capital of, Helali District in Joghatai County, Razavi Khorasan province, Iran. It also serves as the administrative center for Miyan Joveyn Rural District.

== Demographics ==
=== Population ===
At the time of the 2006 National Census, Rivadeh's population was 2,455 in 614 households, when it was a village in Miyan Joveyn Rural District of the former Joghatai District in Sabzevar County. The following census in 2011 counted 2,450 people in 685 households, by which time the district had been separated from the county in the establishment of Joghatai County. The rural district was transferred to the new Helali District. The 2016 census measured the population of the village as 2,447 people in 709 households, when it was listed as Rivadeh-ye Abdolabad, the most populous in its rural district.

Rivadeh was converted to a city in 2017.
