= Mohammadabad-e Gaft =

Village in Razavi Khorasan province, Iran

Mohammadabad-e Gaft Persian: محمداباد گفت
- Village
- Location within Iran
- Coordinates: 36°47′51″N 56°55′30″E
- Country: Iran
- Province: Razavi Khorasan
- County: Joghatai
- District: Helali
- Rural District: Pain Joveyn

Population (2016)
  - Total: 2,773
- Time zone: UTC+3:30 (IRST)

Mohammadabad-e Gaft (Persian: محمدابادگفت) (Note: Also romanized as Moḩammadābād-e Gaft; also known as Moḩammadābād) is a village in Pain Joveyn Rural District of Helali District in Joghatai County, Razavi Khorasan province, Iran.

== Demographics ==
=== Population ===
At the time of the 2006 National Census, the village's population was 2,600 in 691 households, when it was in the former Joghatai District of Sabzevar County. The following census in 2011 counted 2,719 people in 740 households, by which time the district had been separated from the county in the establishment of Joghatai County. The rural district was transferred to the new Helali District. The 2016 census measured the population of the village as 2,773 people in 856 households, the most populous in its rural district.
