= Pain Joveyn Rural District =

Rural district in Razavi Khorasan province, Iran

Pain Joveyn Rural District Persian: دهستان پائين جوين
- Rural District
- Location within Iran
- Coordinates: 36°46′N 56°46′E
- Country: Iran
- Province: Razavi Khorasan
- County: Joghatai
- District: Helali
- Established: 1987
- Capital: Farashian

Population (2016)
  - Total: 12,654
- Time zone: UTC+3:30 (IRST)

Pain Joveyn Rural District (Persian: دهستان پائين جوين) is in Helali District of Joghatai County, Razavi Khorasan province, Iran. Its capital is the village of Farashian.

== Demographics ==
=== Population ===
At the time of the 2006 National Census, the rural district's population (as a part of the former Joghatai District in Sabzevar County) was 12,536 in 3,051 households. There were 12,617 inhabitants in 3,530 households at the following census of 2011, by which time the district had been separated from the county in the establishment of Joghatai County. The rural district was transferred to the new Helali District. The 2016 census measured the population of the rural district as 12,654 in 3,926 households. The most populous of its 28 villages was Mohammadabad-e Gaft, with 2,773 people.

=== Other villages in the rural district ===
- Abdolabad-e Akrad
- Anavi
- Azadvar
- Feyzabad
- Golshanabad
- Hajjiabad
- Hoseynabad
- Istgah-e Azadvar
- Kalateh-ye Gaz
- Khalilabad
- Qaleh-ye Now
- Shafiabad
