= Dasturan Rural District =

Rural district in Razavi Khorasan province, Iran

Dasturan Rural District Persian: دهستان دستوران
- Rural District
- Location within Iran
- Coordinates: 36°39′N 56°54′E
- Country: Iran
- Province: Razavi Khorasan
- County: Joghatai
- District: Central
- Established: 1993
- Capital: Dasturan

Population (2016)
  - Total: 5,068
- Time zone: UTC+3:30 (IRST)

Dasturan Rural District (Persian: دهستان دستوران) is in the Central District of Joghatai County, Razavi Khorasan province, Iran. Its capital is the village of Dasturan.

== Demographics ==
=== Population ===
At the time of the 2006 National Census, the rural district's population (as a part of the former Joghatai District in Sabzevar County) was 5,473 in 1,430 households. There were 5,254 inhabitants in 1,297 households at the following census of 2011, by which time the district had been separated from the county in the establishment of Joghatai County. The rural district was transferred to the new Central District. The 2016 census measured the population of the rural district as 5,068 in 1,613 households. The most populous of its 26 villages was Kohneh, with 902 people.

=== Other villages in the rural district ===
- Allahabad
- Barsal
- Gaft
- Jabaleh
- Javar Tan
- Manidar
- Shadman
