= Joghatai Rural District =

Rural district in Razavi Khorasan province, Iran

Joghatai Rural District دهستان جغتاd
- Rural District
- Location within Iran
- Coordinates: 36°35′N 57°08′E
- Country: Iran
- Province: Razavi Khorasan
- County: Joghatai
- District: Central
- Established: 1987
- Capital: Abu Chenari

Population (2016)
  - Total: 10,912
- Time zone: UTC+3:30 (IRST)

Joghatai Rural District (Persian: دهستان جغتای) is in the Central District of Joghatai County, Razavi Khorasan province, Iran. Its capital is the village of Abu Chenari.

== Demographics ==
=== Population ===
At the time of the 2006 National Census, the rural district's population was (as a part of the former Joghatai District in Sabzevar County) was 10,374 in 2,605 households. There were 10,313 inhabitants in 2,904 households at the following census of 2011, by which time the district had been separated from the county in the establishment of Joghatai County. The rural district was transferred to the new Central District. The 2016 census measured the population of the rural district as 10,912 in 3,261 households. The most populous of its 39 villages was Shahrestanak, with 2,156 people.

=== Other villages in the rural district ===
- Farimaneh
- Hatiteh
- Kalateh-ye Mir Abbas
- Zamand
- Zarqan
