= Miyan Joveyn Rural District =

Rural district in Razavi Khorasan province, Iran

Miyan Joveyn Rural District Persian: دهستان ميان جوين
- Rural District
- Location within Iran
- Coordinates: 36°48′N 57°05′E
- Country: Iran
- Province: Razavi Khorasan
- County: Joghatai
- District: Helali
- Established: 1987
- Capital: Rivadeh

Population (2016)
  - Total: 11,273
- Time zone: UTC+3:30 (IRST)

Miyan Joveyn Rural District (Persian: دهستان ميان جوين) is in Helali District of Joghatai County, Razavi Khorasan province, Iran. It is administered from the city of Rivadeh.

== Demographics ==
=== Population ===
At the time of the 2006 National Census, the rural district's population (as a part of the former Joghatai District in Sabzevar County) was 11,560 in 2,812 households. There were 11,524 inhabitants in 3,140 households at the following census of 2011, by which time the district had been separated from the county in the establishment of Joghatai County. The rural district was transferred to the new Helali District. The 2016 census measured the population of the rural district as 11,273 in 3,453 households. The most populous of its 31 villages was Rivadeh (now a city), with 2,447 people.

=== Other villages in the rural district ===
- Abbasabad-e Qandi
- Abuyesan
- Deh-e Emam
- Feshanjerd
- Guri
- Hojjatabad
- Istgah-e Sankhast
- Kalateh-ye Rezaiyeh
- Khosrow Shir
- Now Bagh
- Rah Chaman
- Samqan
- Seyyedabad-e Akrad
