= Hassan Ghaznavi =

12th century poet

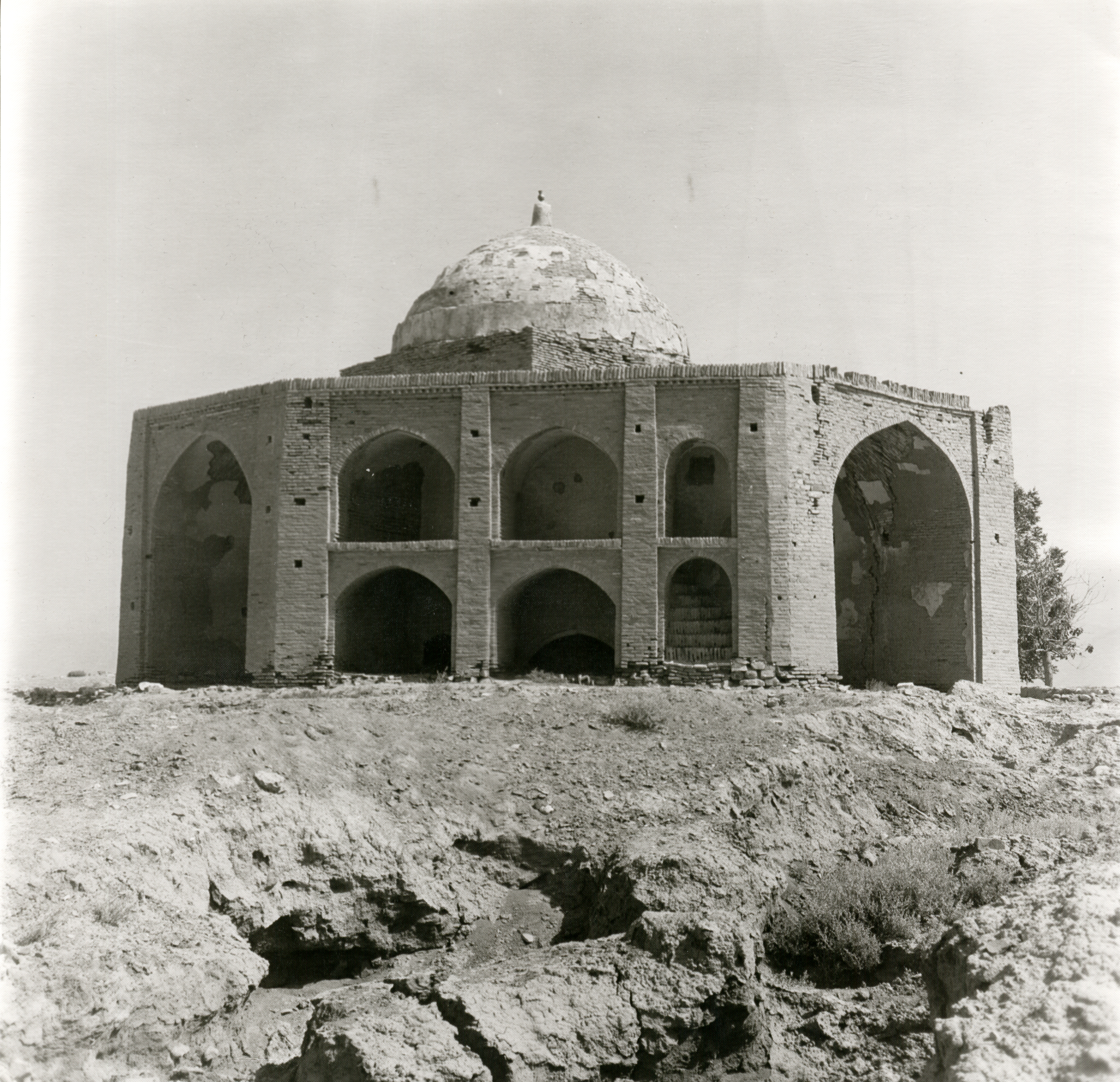
- Tomb of Hasan Ghaznavi in Azadvar, Iran

Ashrafuddin Abu Muhammad Hasan ibn Muhammad Husayni Ghaznavi (Persian: اشرف‌الدین ابو محمد حسن بن محمد حسینی غزنوی) known as Ashraf (اشرف) was a 12th-century Persian poet. A sayyid, he boasted of his lineage from the family of the Islamic prophet Muhammad in his poetry.

Originating from Ghazna now in Afghanistan, he served mostly under Bahram-Shah of the Ghaznavid dynasty. He also served Sultan Sanjar for a while. He died in Azadvar, Iran, where he is buried.

His divan contains 83 ghazals.

He died around 1160 or 1161.

== See also ==
- List of Persian poets and authors
- Persian literature
- Persian poetry
