= Shadman (name) =

Shadman is a surname which is also used as a masculine given name. Notable people with the name include:

== Surname ==
- Ali Shadman (born 1996), Iranian actor
- Fakhreddin Shadman (1907–1967), Iranian scholar and politician

== Given name ==
- Shadman Islam (born 1995), Bangladeshi cricketer
