= Estand =

Estand استند
- Village
- Location within Iran
- Coordinates: 31°18′40″N 60°04′38″E
- Country: Iran
- Province: South Khorasan
- County: Nehbandan
- Bakhsh: Central
- Rural District: Neh

Population (2006)
  - Total: 101
- Time zone: UTC+3:30 (IRST)
  - Summer (DST): UTC+4:30 (IRDT)

Estand (Persian: استند; also known as Īstīn and Eskand) is a village in Neh Rural District, in the Central District of Nehbandan County, South Khorasan Province, Iran. At the 2006 census, its population was 101, in 29 families.

== See also ==
- Gujjar Chah
- Gujjar Ghar
- Nehbandan County
