= Gaft, Sabzevar =

Gaft گفت
- Village
- Location within Iran
- Coordinates: 35°47′46″N 57°25′25″E
- Country: Iran
- Province: Razavi Khorasan
- County: Sabzevar
- Bakhsh: Rud Ab
- Rural District: Khavashod

Population (2006)
  - Total: 34
- Time zone: UTC+3:30 (IRST)
  - Summer (DST): UTC+4:30 (IRDT)

Gaft (Persian: گفت, also Romanized as Gowft and Goft) is a village in the Khavashod Rural District, Rud Ab District, Sabzevar County, Razavi Khorasan Province, Iran. At the 2006 census, its population was 34, in 9 families.
