= Shademan, Kermanshah =

Shademan شادمان
- Village
- Location within Iran
- Coordinates: 34°15′50″N 47°11′20″E
- Country: Iran
- Province: Kermanshah
- County: Kermanshah
- Bakhsh: Central
- Rural District: Qarah Su

Population (2006)
  - Total: 148
- Time zone: UTC+3:30 (IRST)
  - Summer (DST): UTC+4:30 (IRDT)

Shademan (Persian: شادمان, also Romanized as Shādemān) is a village in Qarah Su Rural District, in the Central District of Kermanshah County, Kermanshah Province, Iran. At the 2006 census, its population was 148, in 32 families.
