= Joghatai =

City in Razavi Khorasan Province, Iran

Joghatai جغتای
- City
- Location within Iran
- Coordinates: 36°38′18″N 57°04′18″E
- Country: Iran
- Province: Razavi Khorasan
- County: Joghatai
- District: Central

Population (2016)
  - Total: 9,268
- Time zone: UTC+3:30 (IRST)

Joghatai (Persian: جغتای) (Note: Also romanized as Joghatāy and Jaghatāi) is a city in the Central District of Joghatai County, Razavi Khorasan province, Iran, serving as capital of both the county and the district. It is named after Chagatai Khan, second son of Genghis Khan.

== Demographics ==
=== Population ===
At the time of the 2006 National Census, the city's population was 6,027 in 1,636 households, when it was capital of the former Joghatai District of Sabzevar County. The following census in 2011 counted 8,212 people in 2,060 households, by which time the district had been separated from the county in the establishment of Joghatai County. Joghatai was transferred to the new Central District as the county's capital. The 2016 census measured the population of the city as 9,268 people in 2,630 households.
