= Central District (Joghatai County) =

District in Razavi Khorasan province, Iran

Central District (Joghatai County) Persian: بخش مرکزی شهرستان جغتای
- District
- Location within Iran
- Coordinates: 36°36′N 57°01′E
- Country: Iran
- Province: Razavi Khorasan
- County: Joghatai
- Established: 2007
- Capital: Joghatai

Population (2016)
  - Total: 25,248
- Time zone: UTC+3:30 (IRST)

The Central District of Joghatai County (Persian: بخش مرکزی شهرستان جغتای) is in Razavi Khorasan province, Iran. Its capital is the city of Joghatai.

== History ==
In 2007, Joghatai District was separated from Sabzevar County in the establishment of Joghatai County, which was divided into two districts of two rural districts each, with Joghatai as its capital and only city at the time.

== Demographics ==
=== Population ===
At the time of the 2011 National Census, the district's population was 23,779 people in 6,530 households. The 2016 census measured the population of the district as 25,248 inhabitants in 7,544 households.

=== Administrative divisions ===
Central District (Joghatai County) Population
Administrative Divisions	2011	2016
Dasturan RD	5,254	5,068
Joghatai RD	10,313	10,912
Joghatai (city)	8,212	9,268
Total	23,779	25,248
RD = Rural District
