= Helali District =

District in Razavi Khorasan province, Iran

Helali District Persian: بخش هلالي
- District
- Location within Iran
- Coordinates: 36°47′N 56°55′E
- Country: Iran
- Province: Razavi Khorasan
- County: Joghatai
- Established: 2007
- Capital: Rivadeh

Population (2016)
  - Total: 23,927
- Time zone: UTC+3:30 (IRST)

Helali District (Persian: بخش هلالي) is in Joghatai County, Razavi Khorasan province, Iran. Its capital is the city of Rivadeh.

== History ==
In 2007, Joghatai District was separated from Sabzevar County in the establishment of Joghatai County, which was divided into two districts of two rural districts each, with Joghatai as its capital and only city at the time. The village of Rivadeh was converted to a city in 2017.

== Demographics ==
=== Population ===
At the time of the 2011 National Census, the district's population was 24,141 people in 6,670 households. The 2016 census measured the population of the district as 23,927 in 7,379 households.

=== Administrative divisions ===
Helali District Population
Administrative Divisions	2011	2016
Miyan Joveyn RD	11,524	11,273
Pain Joveyn RD	12,617	12,654
Rivadeh (city) (Note: Became a city after the 2016 census)		
Total	24,141	23,927
RD = Rural District
