= Joghatai District =

Former district in Razavi Khorasan province, Iran

Joghatai District Persian: بخش جغتای
- Former District
- Location within Iran
- Coordinates: 36°40′N 56°57′E
- Country: Iran
- Province: Razavi Khorasan
- County: Sabzevar
- Capital: Joghatai

Population (2006)
  - Total: 45,970
- Time zone: UTC+3:30 (IRST)

Joghatai District (Persian: بخش جغتای) is a former administrative division of Sabzevar County, Razavi Khorasan province, Iran. Its capital was the city of Joghatai.

== History ==
In 2007, the district was separated from the county in the establishment of Joghatai County.

== Demographics ==
=== Population ===
At the time of the 2006 National Census, the district's population was 45,970 in 11,534 households.

=== Administrative divisions ===
Joghatai District Population
Administrative Divisions	2006
Dasturan RD	5,473
Joghatai RD	10,374
Miyan Joveyn RD	11,560
Pain Joveyn RD	12,536
Joghatai (city)	6,027
Total	45,970
RD = Rural District
