= Joghatai County =

County in Razavi Khorasan Province, Iran

Joghatai County شهرستان جغتای
- County
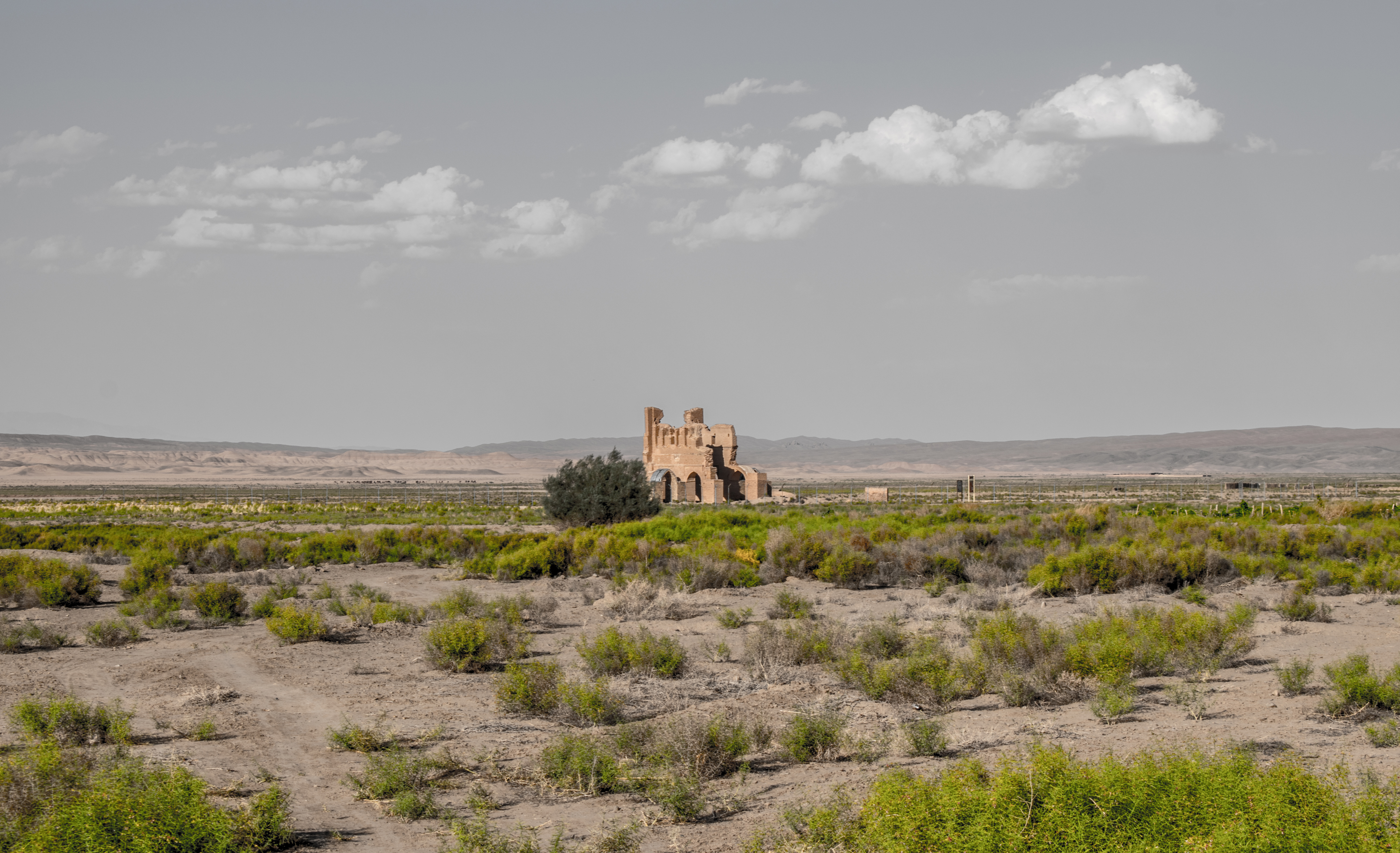
- Landscape surrounding the ruins of Khosrow Shir mosque

- Location of Joghatai County in Razavi Khorasan province (top left, green)

- Location of Razavi Khorasan province in Iran
- Coordinates: 36°40′N 56°57′E
- Country: Iran
- Province: Razavi Khorasan
- Established: 2007
- Capital: Joghatai
- Districts: Central, Helali

Area
  - Total: 1,716 km^{2} (663 sq mi)

Population (2016)
  - Total: 49,175
  - Density: 28.66/km^{2} (74.22/sq mi)
- Time zone: UTC+3:30 (IRST)

Joghatai County (Persian: شهرستان جغتای) is in Razavi Khorasan province, Iran. Its capital is the city of Joghatai.

== History ==
In 2007, Joghatai District was separated from Sabzevar County in the establishment of Joghatai County, which was divided into two districts of two rural districts each, with Joghatai as its capital and only city at the time. The village of Rivadeh was converted to a city in 2017.

== Demographics ==
=== Population ===
At the time of the 2011 National Census, the county's population was 47,920 people in 13,181 households. The 2016 census measured the population of the county as 49,175 in 14,923 households.

=== Administrative divisions ===
Joghatai County's population history and administrative structure over two consecutive censuses are shown in the following table.

Joghatai County Population
Administrative Divisions	2011	2016
Central District	23,779	25,248
Dasturan RD	5,254	5,068
Joghatai RD	10,313	10,912
Joghatai (city)	8,212	9,268
Helali District	24,141	23,927
Miyan Joveyn RD	11,524	11,273
Pain Joveyn RD	12,617	12,654
Rivadeh (city) (Note: Became a city after the 2016 census)		
Total	47,920	49,175
RD = Rural District

== See also ==
Media related to Joghatai County at Wikimedia Commons
