= Borughan =

Village in Razavi Khorasan province, Iran

Borughan Persian: بروغن
- Village
- Location within Iran
- Coordinates: 36°09′35″N 57°04′07″E
- Country: Iran
- Province: Razavi Khorasan
- County: Davarzan
- District: Bashtin
- Rural District: Mehr

Population (2016)
  - Total: 129
- Time zone: UTC+3:30 (IRST)

Borughan (Persian: بروغن) (Note: Also romanized as Borūghan) is a village in Mehr Rural District of Bashtin District in Davarzan County, Razavi Khorasan province, Iran.

== Demographics ==
=== Population ===
At the time of the 2006 National Census, the village's population was 238 in 66 households, when it was in Kah Rural District of the former Davarzan District in Sabzevar County. The following census in 2011 counted 186 people in 61 households. The 2016 census measured the population of the village as 129 people in 48 households, by which time the district had been separated from the county in the establishment of Davarzan County. The rural district was transferred to the new Central District, and the village was transferred to Mehr Rural District created in the new Bashtin District.
