= Mehr, Razavi Khorasan =

Village in Razavi Khorasan province, Iran

Mehr Persian: مهر
- Village
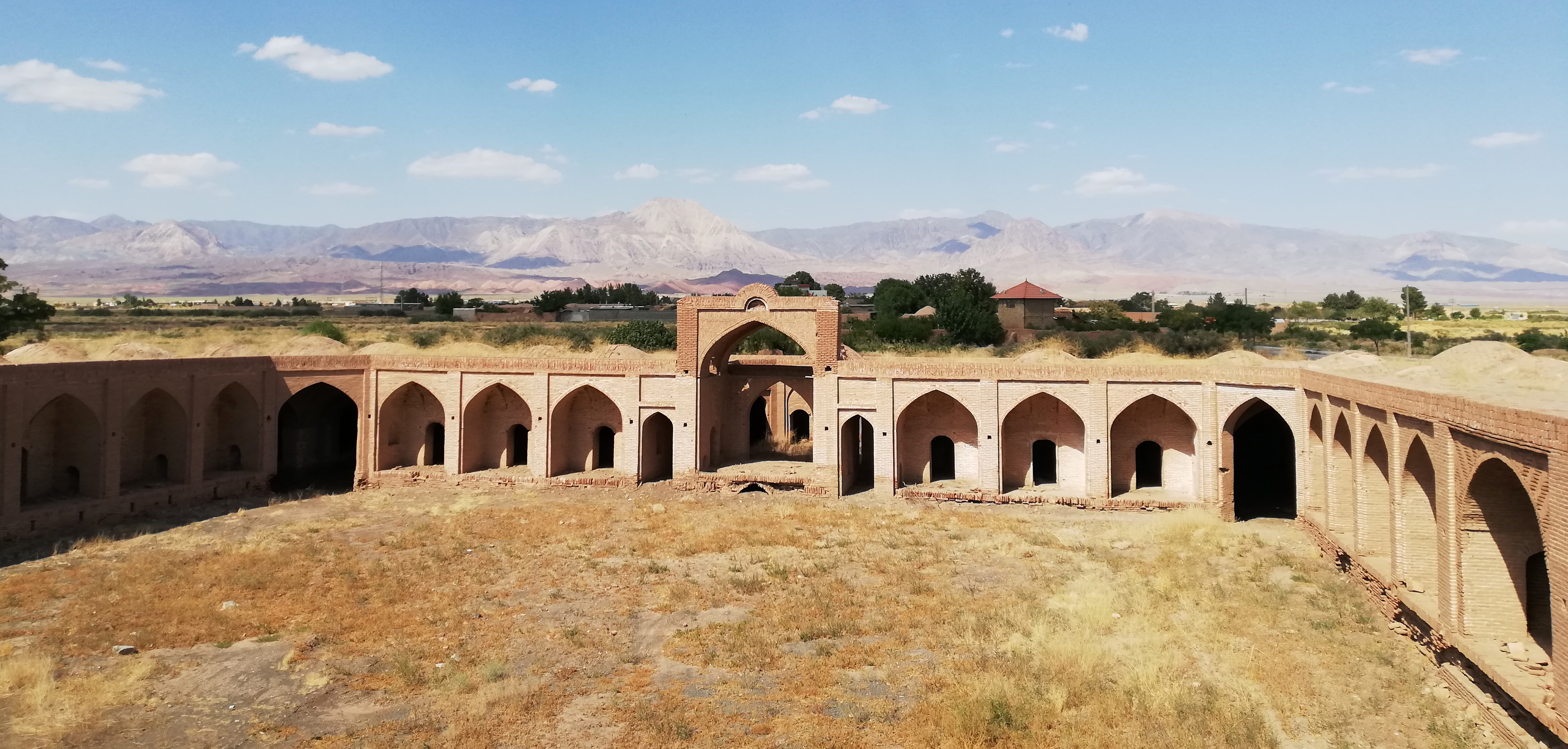
- Caravanserai monument in the village of Mehr

- Location within Iran
- Coordinates: 36°17′34″N 57°08′56″E
- Country: Iran
- Province: Razavi Khorasan
- County: Davarzan
- District: Bashtin
- Rural District: Mehr

Population (2016)
  - Total: 1,812
- Time zone: UTC+3:30 (IRST)

Mehr (Persian: مهر) (Note: Also known as Mīhr) is a village in, and the capital of, Mehr Rural District in Bashtin District of Davarzan County, Razavi Khorasan province, Iran.

== Demographics ==
=== Population ===
At the time of the 2006 National Census, the village's population was 1,361 in 394 households, when it was in Kah Rural District of the former Davarzan District in Sabzevar County. The following census in 2011 counted 1,356 people in 434 households. The 2016 census measured the population of the village as 1,812 people in 553 households, by which time the district had been separated from the county in the establishment of Davarzan County. The rural district was transferred to the new Central District, and the village was transferred to Mehr Rural District created in the new Bashtin District. Mehr was the most populous village in its rural district.

== See also ==
- Adur Burzen-Mihr
- Mehr Caravanserai
