= Moqiseh =

Village in Razavi Khorasan province, Iran

Moqiseh Persian: مقيسه
- Village
- Location within Iran
- Coordinates: 36°10′03″N 57°06′07″E
- Country: Iran
- Province: Razavi Khorasan
- County: Davarzan
- District: Bashtin
- Rural District: Mehr

Population (2016)
  - Total: 692
- Time zone: UTC+3:30 (IRST)

Moqiseh (Persian: مقيسه) (Note: Also romanized as Moqīseh; also known as Magīsā, Makisa, and Moghīs̄eh) is a village in Mehr Rural District of Bashtin District in Davarzan County, Razavi Khorasan province, Iran.

== Demographics ==
=== Population ===
At the time of the 2006 National Census, the village's population was 644 in 221 households, when it was in Kah Rural District of the former Davarzan District in Sabzevar County. The following census in 2011 counted 576 people in 219 households. The 2016 census measured the population of the village as 692 people in 248 households, by which time the district had been separated from the county in the establishment of Davarzan County. The rural district was transferred to the new Central District, and the village was transferred to Mehr Rural District created in the new Bashtin District.
