= Bohangar =

Village in Razavi Khorasan province, Iran

Bohangar Persian: بهنگر
- Village
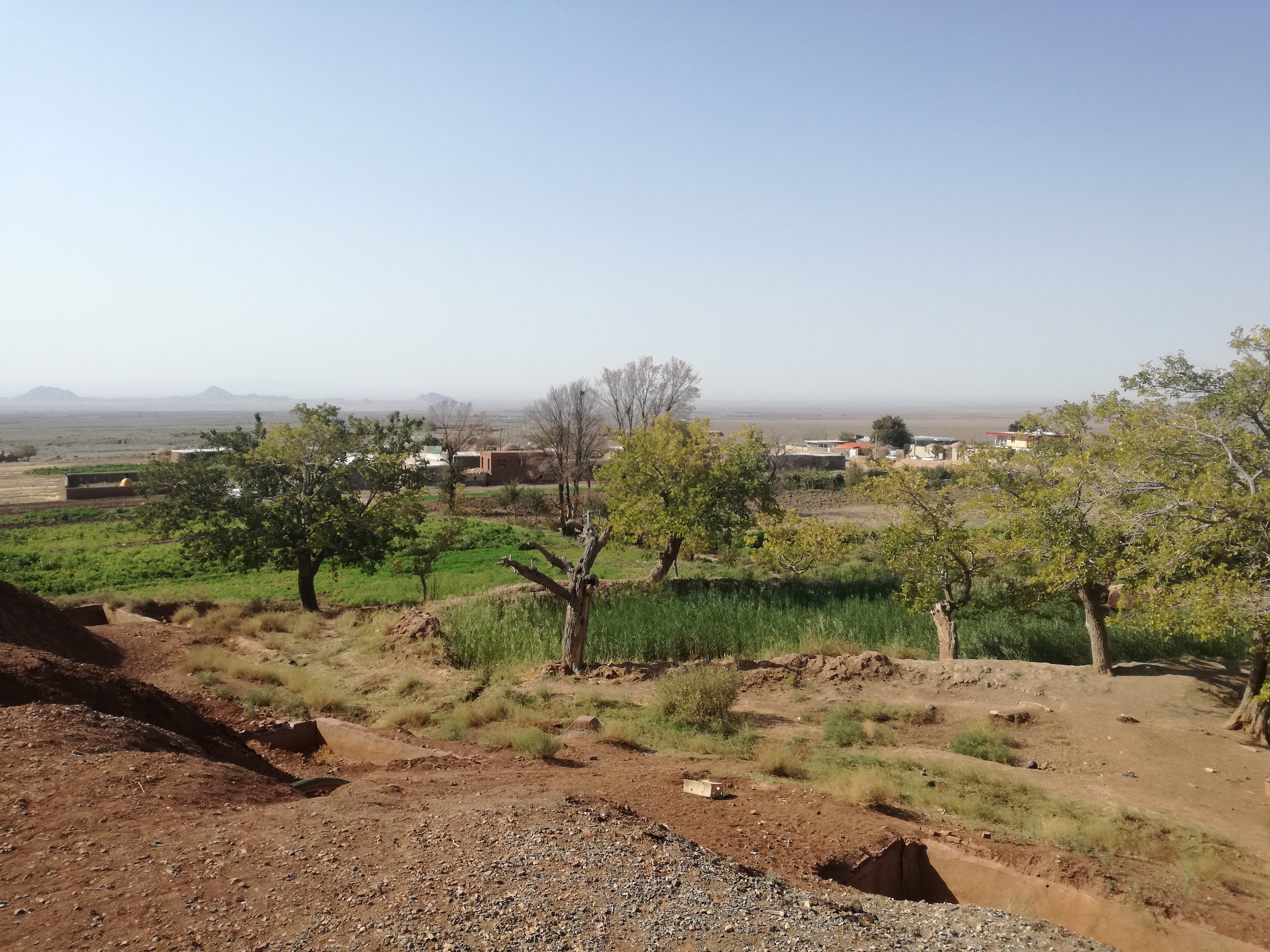
- The village of Bohangar

- Location within Iran
- Coordinates: 36°19′47″N 57°10′11″E
- Country: Iran
- Province: Razavi Khorasan
- County: Davarzan
- District: Bashtin
- Rural District: Mehr

Population (2016)
  - Total: 120
- Time zone: UTC+3:30 (IRST)

Bohangar (Persian: بهنگر) (Note: Also romanized as Bahangar, Bahongar, and Bohongar; also known as Bahāngar (بهانگر), Bahāngard, and Kolā Khūnī) is a village in Mehr Rural District of Bashtin District in Davarzan County, Razavi Khorasan province, Iran.

== Demographics ==
=== Population ===
At the time of the 2006 National Census, the village's population was 83 in 22 households, when it was in Kah Rural District of the former Davarzan District in Sabzevar County. The following census in 2011 counted 63 people in 18 households. The 2016 census measured the population of the village as 120 people in 40 households, by which time the district had been separated from the county in the establishment of Davarzan County. The rural district was transferred to the new Central District, and the village was transferred to Mehr Rural District created in the new Bashtin District.
