= Bashtin =

Bashtin (Persian: باشتين or بشتين) may refer to:

- Bashtin, Hormozgan (بشتين - Bashtīn)
- Bashtin, Razavi Khorasan (باشتين - Bāshtīn)
- Bashtin District, in Razavi Khorasan Province
- Bashtin Rural District, in Razavi Khorasan Province
