= Kalateh-ye Sadat-e Bala, Razavi Khorasan =

Village in Razavi Khorasan province, Iran

Kalateh-ye Sadat-e Bala Persian: كلاته سادات بالا
- Village
- Location within Iran
- Coordinates: 36°19′35″N 57°12′35″E
- Country: Iran
- Province: Razavi Khorasan
- County: Davarzan
- District: Bashtin
- Rural District: Mehr

Population (2016)
  - Total: 127
- Time zone: UTC+3:30 (IRST)

Kalateh-ye Sadat-e Bala (Persian: كلاته سادات بالا) (Note: Also romanized as Kalāteh-ye Sādāt-e Bālā; also known as Kalāteh-ye Sādāt and Kalāteh-ye Sādāt Mehr) is a village in Mehr Rural District of Bashtin District in Davarzan County, Razavi Khorasan province, Iran.

== Demographics ==
=== Population ===
At the time of the 2006 National Census, the village's population was 143 in 49 households, when it was in Bashtin Rural District of the former Davarzan District in Sabzevar County. The following census in 2011 counted 141 people in 47 households. The 2016 census measured the population of the village as 127 people in 49 households, by which time the district had been separated from the county in the establishment of Davarzan County. The rural district was transferred to the new Bashtin District, and Kalateh-ye Sadat-e Bala was transferred to Mehr Rural District created in the same district.
