= Chesham, Iran =

Village in Razavi Khorasan province, Iran

Chesham Persian: چشام
- Village
- Location within Iran
- Coordinates: 36°09′51″N 57°02′25″E
- Country: Iran
- Province: Razavi Khorasan
- County: Davarzan
- District: Bashtin
- Rural District: Mehr

Population (2016)
  - Total: 1,395
- Time zone: UTC+3:30 (IRST)

Chesham (Persian: چشام) (Note: Also romanized as Cheshām; also known as Cheshm, Cheshom, and Chisham) is a village in Mehr Rural District of Bashtin District in Davarzan County, Razavi Khorasan province, Iran.

== Demographics ==
=== Population ===
At the time of the 2006 National Census, the village's population was 1,535 in 401 households, when it was in Kah Rural District of the former Davarzan District in Sabzevar County. The following census in 2011 counted 1,613 people in 453 households. The 2016 census measured the population of the village as 1,395 people in 435 households, by which time the district had been separated from the county in the establishment of Davarzan County. The rural district was transferred to the new Central District, and the village was transferred to Mehr Rural District created in the new Bashtin District.
