= Hoseynabad, Davarzan =

Village in Razavi Khorasan province, Iran

Hoseynabad Persian: حسين اباد
- Village
- Location within Iran
- Coordinates: 36°11′05″N 57°13′11″E
- Country: Iran
- Province: Razavi Khorasan
- County: Davarzan
- District: Bashtin
- Rural District: Mehr

Population (2016)
  - Total: 514
- Time zone: UTC+3:30 (IRST)

Hoseynabad (Persian: حسين اباد) (Note: Also romanized as Ḩoseynābād) is a village in Mehr Rural District of Bashtin District in Davarzan County, Razavi Khorasan province, Iran.

== Demographics ==
=== Population ===
At the time of the 2006 National Census, the village's population was 734 in 198 households, when it was in Bashtin Rural District of the former Davarzan District in Sabzevar County. The following census in 2011 counted 579 people in 180 households. The 2016 census measured the population of the village as 514 people in 174 households, by which time the district had been separated from the county in the establishment of Davarzan County. The rural district was transferred to the new Bashtin District, and Hoseynabad was transferred to Mehr Rural District created in the same district.
