= Mehrabad, Davarzan =

Village in Razavi Khorasan province, Iran

Mehrabad Persian: مهراباد
- Village
- Location within Iran
- Coordinates: 36°11′07″N 57°11′21″E
- Country: Iran
- Province: Razavi Khorasan
- County: Davarzan
- District: Bashtin
- Rural District: Mehr

Population (2016)
  - Total: 334
- Time zone: UTC+3:30 (IRST)

Mehrabad (Persian: مهراباد) (Note: Also romanized as Mehrābād; also known as Mihrābād) is a village in Mehr Rural District of Bashtin District in Davarzan County, Razavi Khorasan province, Iran.

== Demographics ==
=== Population ===
At the time of the 2006 National Census, the village's population was 420 in 110 households, when it was in Bashtin Rural District of the former Davarzan District in Sabzevar County. The following census in 2011 counted 342 people in 119 households. The 2016 census measured the population of the village as 334 people in 112 households, by which time the district had been separated from the county in the establishment of Davarzan County. The rural district was transferred to the new Bashtin District, and Mehrabad was transferred to Mehr Rural District created in the same district.
