= Seviz =

Village in Razavi Khorasan province, Iran

Seviz Persian: سويز
- Village
- Location within Iran
- Coordinates: 36°19′52″N 56°47′17″E
- Country: Iran
- Province: Razavi Khorasan
- County: Davarzan
- District: Central
- Rural District: Mazinan

Population (2016)
  - Total: 252
- Time zone: UTC+3:30 (IRST)

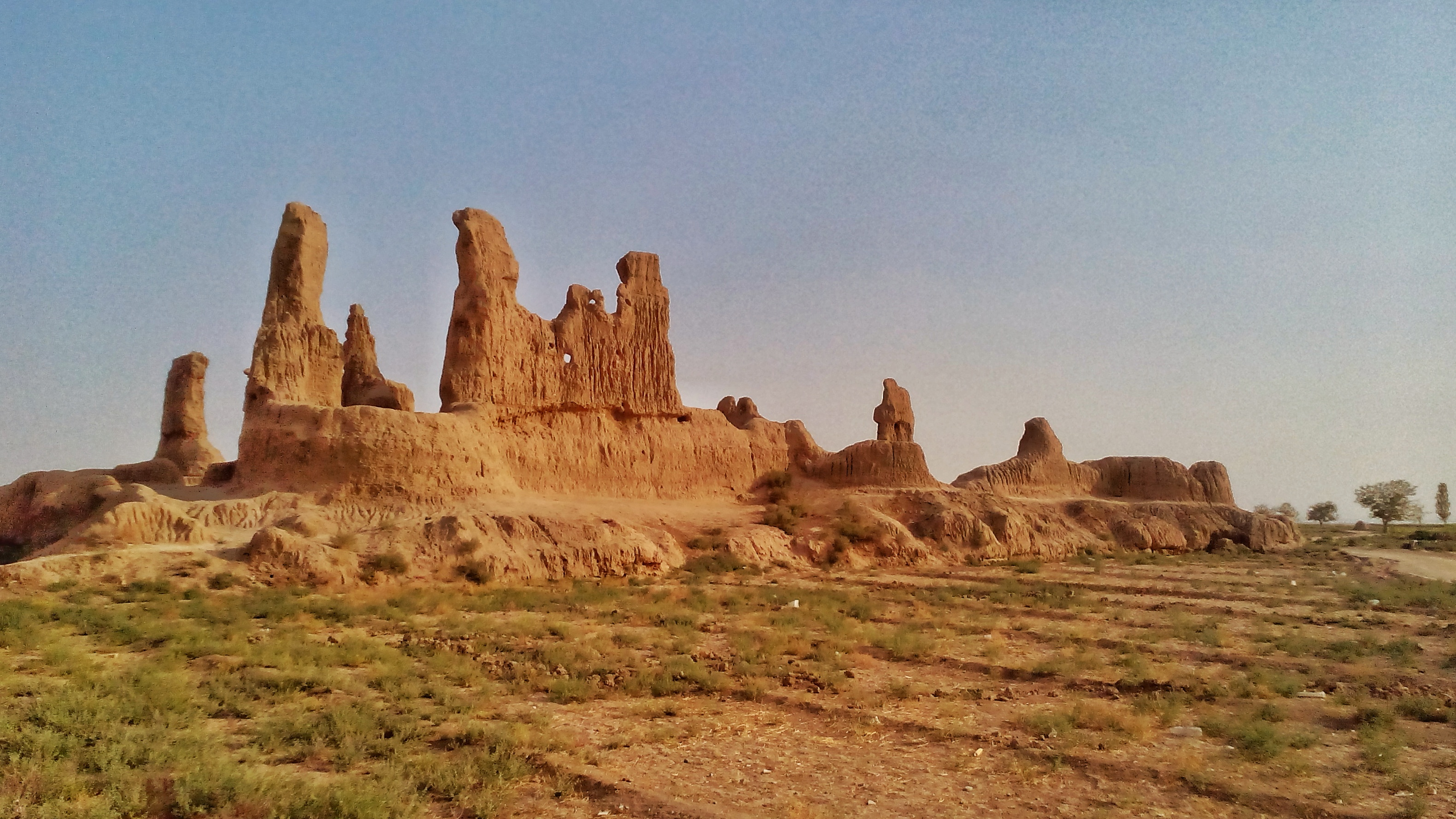
Castle of the priests of Suez

Seviz (Persian: سويز) (Note: Also romanized as Sevīz) is a village in Mazinan Rural District of the Central District in Davarzan County, Razavi Khorasan province, Iran.

== Demographics ==
=== Population ===
At the time of the 2006 National Census, the village's population was 272 in 97 households, when it was in the former Davarzan District of Sabzevar County. The following census in 2011 counted 230 people in 93 households. The 2016 census measured the population of the village as 252 people in 98 households, by which time the district had been separated from the county with the establishment of Davarzan County. The rural district was transferred to the new Central District. It was the most populous village in its rural district.
