= Ghaniabad, Razavi Khorasan =

Village in Razavi Khorasan province, Iran

Ghaniabad Persian: غني اباد
- Village
- Location within Iran
- Coordinates: 36°16′46″N 56°48′32″E
- Country: Iran
- Province: Razavi Khorasan
- County: Davarzan
- District: Central
- Rural District: Mazinan

Population (2016)
  - Total: 218
- Time zone: UTC+3:30 (IRST)

Ghaniabad (Persian: غني اباد) (Note: Also romanized as Ghanīābād) is a village in Mazinan Rural District of the Central District in Davarzan County, Razavi Khorasan province, Iran.

== Demographics ==
=== Population ===
At the time of the 2006 National Census, the village's population was 309 in 97 households, when it was in the former Davarzan District of Sabzevar County. The following census in 2011 counted 273 people in 106 households. The 2016 census measured the population of the village as 218 people in 94 households, by which time the district had been separated from the county with the establishment of Davarzan County. The rural district was transferred to the new Central District. It was the most populous village in its rural district.
