= Baghesht =

Village in Razavi Khorasan province, Iran

Baghesht Persian: باغشت
- Village
- Location within Iran
- Coordinates: 36°17′21″N 57°18′38″E
- Country: Iran
- Province: Razavi Khorasan
- County: Davarzan
- District: Bashtin
- Rural District: Bashtin

Population (2016)
  - Total: Below reporting threshold
- Time zone: UTC+3:30 (IRST)

Baghesht (Persian: باغشت) (Note: Also romanized as Bāghesht) is a village in Bashtin Rural District of Bashtin District in Davarzan County, Razavi Khorasan province, Iran.

== Demographics ==
=== Population ===
At the time of the 2006 National Census, the village's population was 11 in four households, when it was in the former Davarzan District of Sabzevar County. The following census in 2011 counted a population below the reporting threshold. The 2016 census again measured the population of the village as below the reporting threshold, by which time the district had been separated from the county in the establishment of Davarzan County. The rural district was transferred to the new Bashtin District.
