= Kahak, Razavi Khorasan =

Village in Razavi Khorasan province, Iran

Kahak Persian: کاهک
- Village
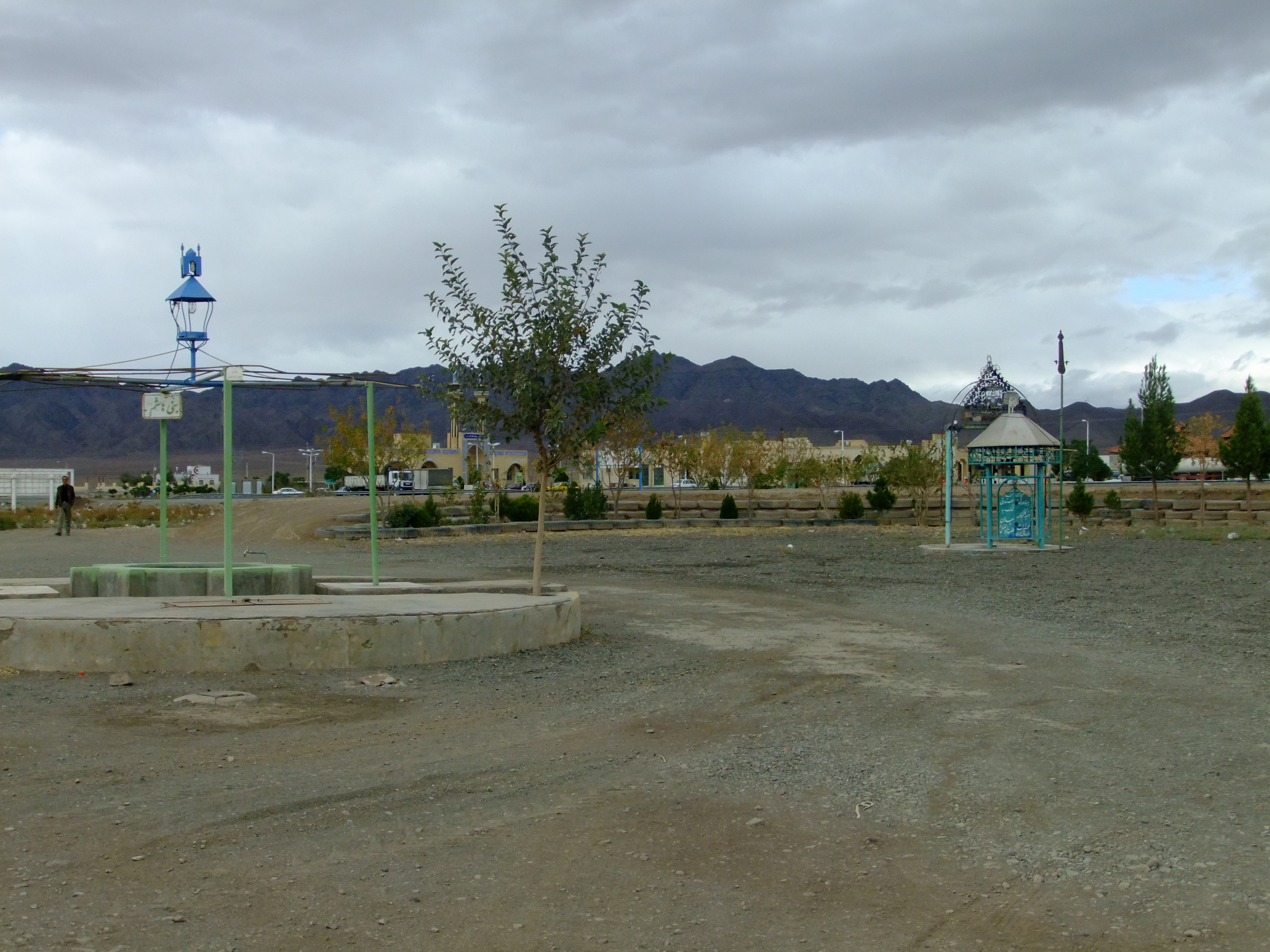
- Main square in the village of Kahak

- Location within Iran
- Coordinates: 36°21′10″N 56°46′23″E
- Country: Iran
- Province: Razavi Khorasan
- County: Davarzan
- District: Central
- Rural District: Mazinan

Population (2016)
  - Total: 285
- Time zone: UTC+3:30 (IRST)

Kahak (Persian: کاهک) (Note: Also romanized as Kāhak; also known as Kahe, Kāheh, and Khak) is a village in Mazinan Rural District of the Central District in Davarzan County, Razavi Khorasan province, Iran.

== Demographics ==
=== Population ===
At the time of the 2006 National Census, the village's population was 375 in 124 households, when it was in the former Davarzan District of Sabzevar County. The following census in 2011 counted 311 people in 109 households. The 2016 census measured the population of the village as 285 people in 112 households, by which time the district had been separated from the county with the establishment of Davarzan County. The rural district was transferred to the new Central District. It was the most populous village in its rural district.

== Notable people ==
- Ali Shariati, Iran revolutionary

== Gallery ==
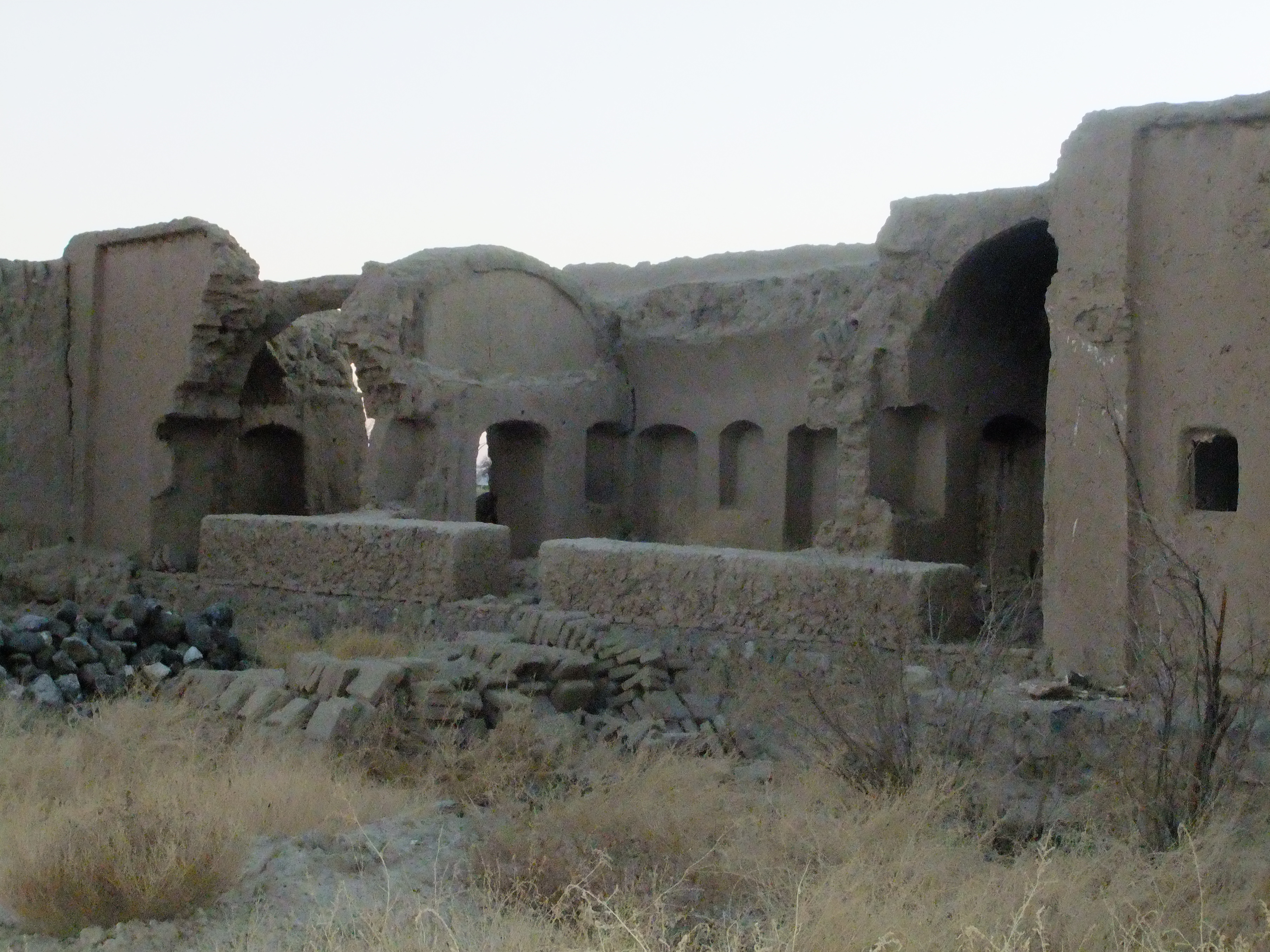
Ali Shariati's house from the rear

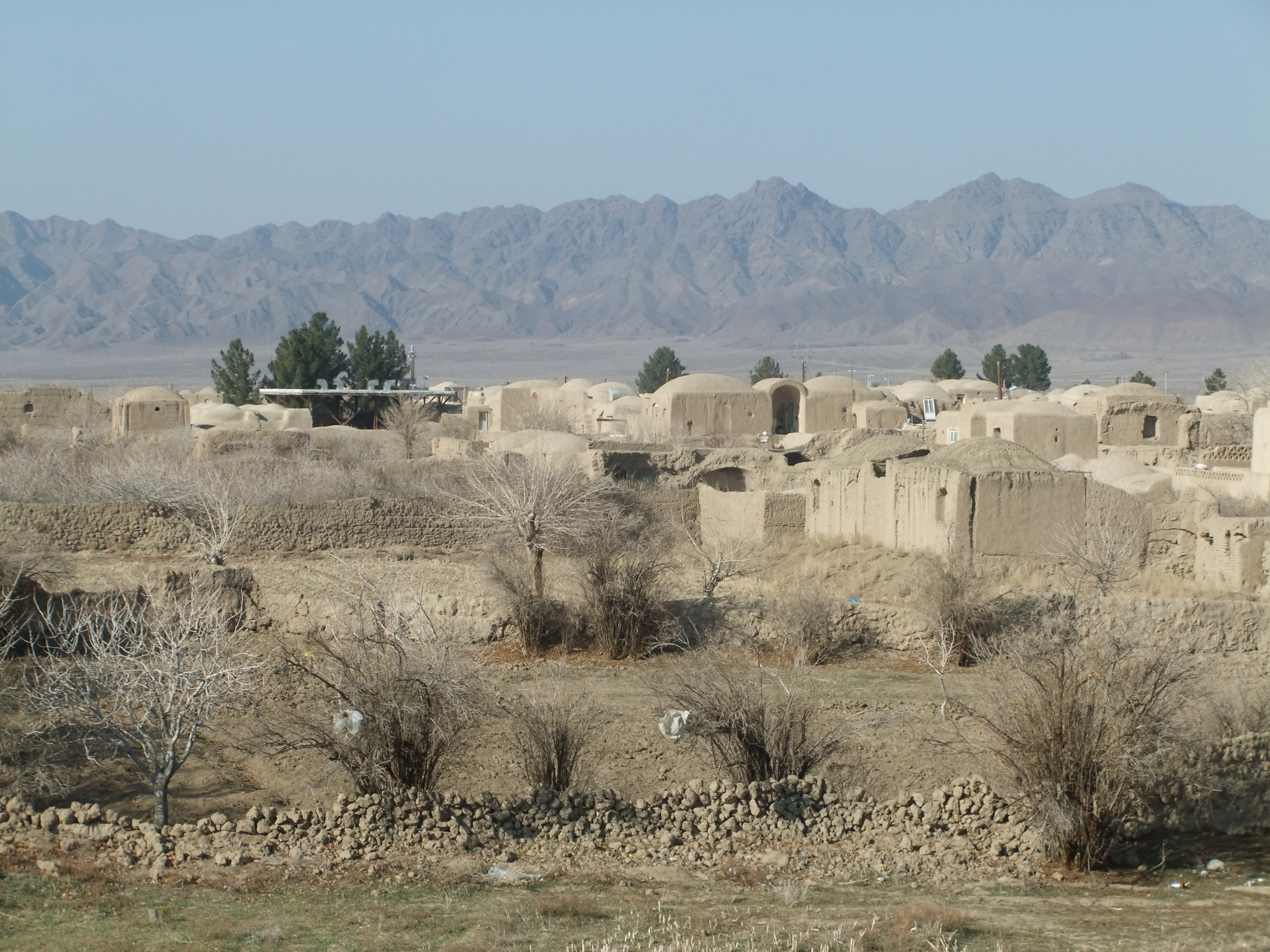
View of the village

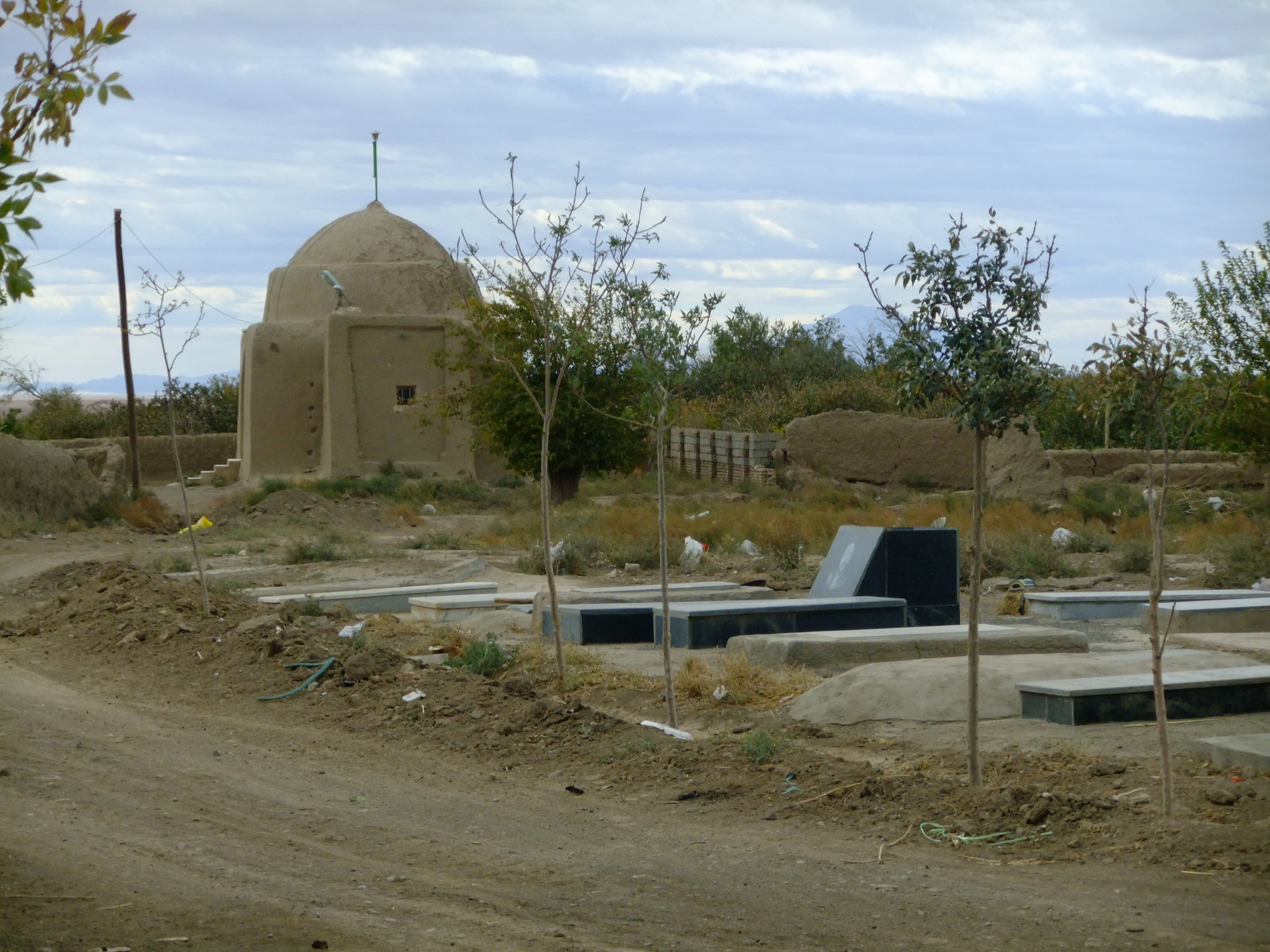
Old shrine in the village of Kahak
