= Zard Kuh, Iran =

Village in Razavi Khorasan province, Iran

Zard Kuh Persian: زردکوه
- Village
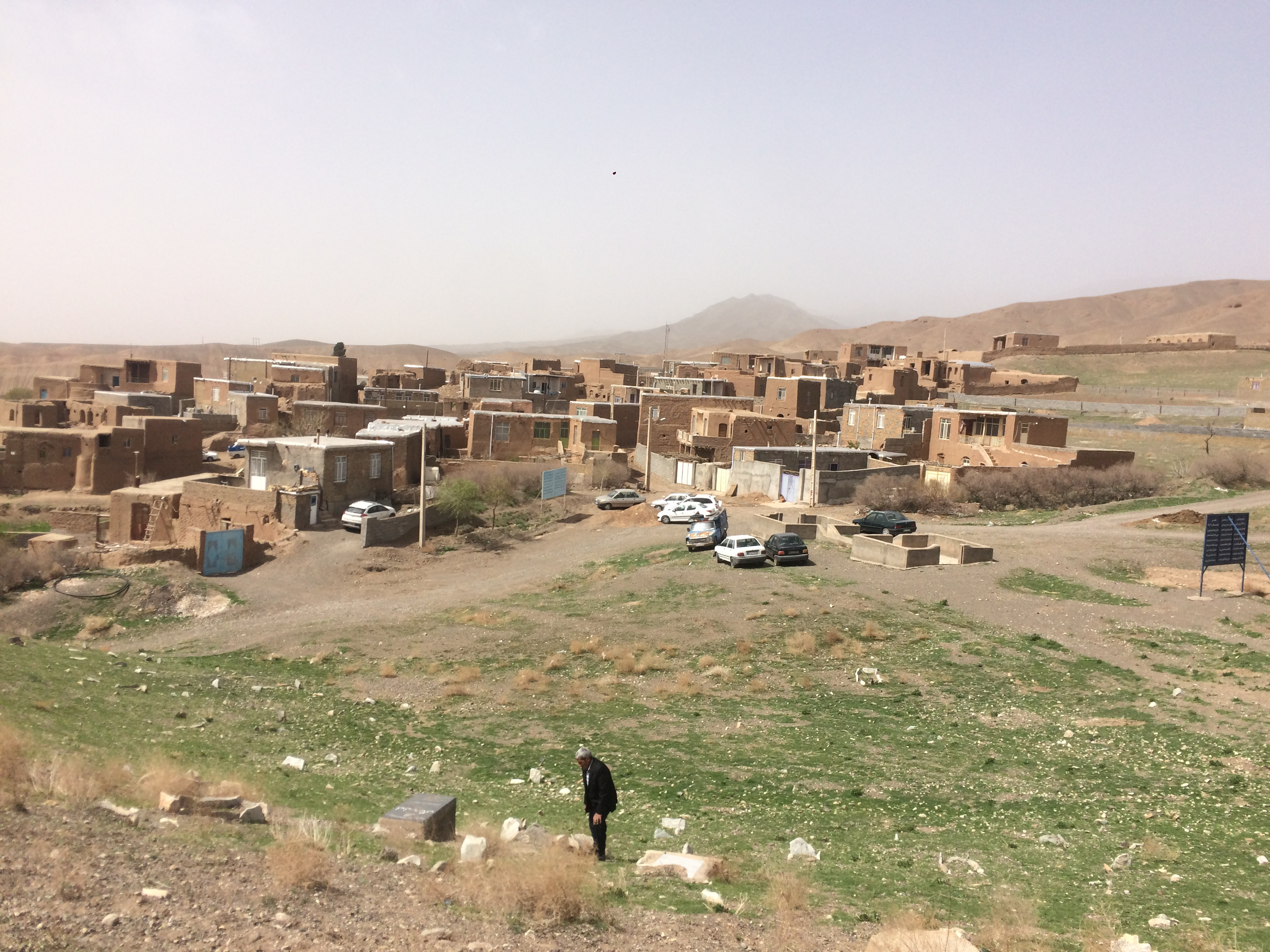
- The village of Zard Kuh

- Location within Iran
- Coordinates: 36°17′18″N 57°24′15″E
- Country: Iran
- Province: Razavi Khorasan
- County: Davarzan
- District: Bashtin
- Rural District: Bashtin

Population (2016)
  - Total: 196
- Time zone: UTC+3:30 (IRST)

Zard Kuh (Persian: زردکوهی) (Note: Also romanized as Zard Kūh; formerly known as Zard Kuhi, also romanized as Zard Kūhī) is a village in Bashtin Rural District of Bashtin District in Davarzan County, Razavi Khorasan province, Iran.

== Demographics ==
=== Population ===
At the time of the 2006 National Census, the village's population, as Zard Kuhi, was 127 in 46 households, when it was in the former Davarzan District of Sabzevar County. The following census in 2011 counted 169 people in 59 households. The 2016 census measured the population of the village as 196 people in 64 households, by which time the district had been separated from the county in the establishment of Davarzan County. The rural district was transferred to the new Bashtin District and the village was listed as Zard Kuh.
