= Khosrowabad, Davarzan =

Village in Razavi Khorasan province, Iran

Khosrowabad Persian: خسرواباد
- Village
- Location within Iran
- Coordinates: 36°10′33″N 57°00′33″E
- Province: Razavi Khorasan
- County: Davarzan
- District: Central
- Rural District: Kah

Population (2016)
  - Total: 151
- Time zone: UTC+3:30 (IRST)

Khosrowabad (Persian: خسرواباد) (Note: Also romanized as Khosrowābād) is a village in Kah Rural District of the Central District in Davarzan County, Razavi Khorasan province, Iran.

== Demographics ==
=== Population ===
At the time of the 2006 National Census, the village's population was 346 in 102 households, when it was in the former Davarzan District of Sabzevar County. The following census in 2011 counted 236 people in 84 households. The 2016 census measured the population of the village as 151 people in 54 households, by which time the district had been separated from the county in the establishment of Davarzan County. The rural district was transferred to the new Central District.
