= Chubin, Razavi Khorasan =

Village in Razavi Khorasan province, Iran

Chubin Persian: چوبين
- Village
- Location within Iran
- Coordinates: 36°11′07″N 56°59′25″E
- Province: Razavi Khorasan
- County: Davarzan
- District: Central
- Rural District: Kah

Population (2016)
  - Total: 114
- Time zone: UTC+3:30 (IRST)

Chubin (Persian: چوبين) (Note: Also romanized as Chūbīn; also known as Chubāīn and Chūbāyen) is a village in Kah Rural District of the Central District in Davarzan County, Razavi Khorasan province, Iran.

== Demographics ==
=== Population ===
At the time of the 2006 National Census, the village's population was 232 in 66 households, when it was in the former Davarzan District of Sabzevar County. The following census in 2011 counted 95 people in 34 households. The 2016 census measured the population of the village as 114 people in 52 households, by which time the district had been separated from the county in the establishment of Davarzan County. The rural district was transferred to the new Central District.
