= Baqerabad, Davarzan =

Village in Razavi Khorasan province, Iran

Baqerabad Persian: باقراباد
- Village
- Location within Iran
- Coordinates: 36°10′46″N 56°59′16″E
- Province: Razavi Khorasan
- County: Davarzan
- District: Central
- Rural District: Kah

Population (2016)
  - Total: 222
- Time zone: UTC+3:30 (IRST)

Baqerabad (Persian: باقراباد) (Note: Also romanized as Bāqerābād) is a village in Kah Rural District of the Central District in Davarzan County, Razavi Khorasan province, Iran.

== Demographics ==
=== Population ===
At the time of the 2006 National Census, the village's population was 311 in 76 households, when it was in the former Davarzan District of Sabzevar County. The following census in 2011 counted 276 people in 83 households. The 2016 census measured the population of the village as 222 people in 71 households, by which time the district had been separated from the county in the establishment of Davarzan County. The rural district was transferred to the new Central District.
