= Saruq, Razavi Khorasan =

Village in Razavi Khorasan province, Iran

Saruq Persian: ساروق
- Village
- Location within Iran
- Coordinates: 36°20′30″N 57°18′37″E
- Country: Iran
- Province: Razavi Khorasan
- County: Davarzan
- District: Bashtin
- Rural District: Bashtin

Population (2016)
  - Total: 381
- Time zone: UTC+3:30 (IRST)

Saruq (Persian: ساروق) (Note: Also romanized as Sārūq; also known as Sāroq) is a village in Bashtin Rural District of Bashtin District in Davarzan County, Razavi Khorasan province, Iran.

== Demographics ==
=== Population ===
At the time of the 2006 National Census, the village's population was 119 in 53 households, when it was in the former Davarzan District of Sabzevar County. The following census in 2011 counted 183 people in 92 households. The 2016 census measured the population of the village as 381 people in 131 households, by which time the district had been separated from the county in the establishment of Davarzan County. The rural district was transferred to the new Bashtin District.
