= Tajabad, Razavi Khorasan =

Village in Razavi Khorasan province, Iran

Tajabad Persian: تاج اباد
- Village
- Location within Iran
- Coordinates: 36°10′34″N 57°18′17″E
- Country: Iran
- Province: Razavi Khorasan
- County: Davarzan
- District: Bashtin
- Rural District: Bashtin

Population (2016)
  - Total: 108
- Time zone: UTC+3:30 (IRST)

Tajabad (Persian: تاج‌آباد) (Note: Also romanized as Tājābād) is a village in Bashtin Rural District of Bashtin District in Davarzan County, Razavi Khorasan province, Iran.

== Demographics ==
=== Population ===
At the time of the 2006 National Census, the village's population was 100 in 36 households, when it was in the former Davarzan District of Sabzevar County. The following census in 2011 counted 67 people in 34 households. The 2016 census measured the population of the village as 108 people in 42 households, by which time the district had been separated from the county in the establishment of Davarzan County. The rural district was transferred to the new Bashtin District.
