= Shahr-e Ayin =

Village in Razavi Khorasan province, Iran

Shahr-e Ayin Persian: شهرايين
- Village
- Location within Iran
- Coordinates: 36°10′20″N 57°15′24″E
- Country: Iran
- Province: Razavi Khorasan
- County: Davarzan
- District: Bashtin
- Rural District: Bashtin

Population (2016)
  - Total: 98
- Time zone: UTC+3:30 (IRST)

Shahr-e Ayin (Persian: شهرايين) (Note: Also romanized as Shahr-e Āyīn; also known as Shahr-e Ain, also romanized as Shahr-e Ā’īn) is a village in Bashtin Rural District of Bashtin District in Davarzan County, Razavi Khorasan province, Iran.

== Demographics ==
=== Population ===
At the time of the 2006 National Census, the village's population was 128 in 43 households, when it was in the former Davarzan District of Sabzevar County. The following census in 2011 counted 121 people in 41 households. The 2016 census measured the population of the village as 98 people in 34 households, by which time the district had been separated from the county in the establishment of Davarzan County. The rural district was transferred to the new Bashtin District.
