= Mur, Razavi Khorasan =

Village in Razavi Khorasan province, Iran

Mur Persian: مور
- Village
- Location within Iran
- Coordinates: 36°28′51″N 56°54′32″E
- Country: Iran
- Province: Razavi Khorasan
- County: Davarzan
- District: Central
- Rural District: Mazinan

Population (2016)
  - Total: 162
- Time zone: UTC+3:30 (IRST)

Mur (Persian: مور) (Note: Also romanized as Mūr) is a village in Mazinan Rural District of the Central District in Davarzan County, Razavi Khorasan province, Iran.

== Demographics ==
=== Population ===
At the time of the 2006 National Census, the village's population was 203 in 62 households, when it was in the former Davarzan District of Sabzevar County. The following census in 2011 counted 183 people in 65 households. The 2016 census measured the population of the village as 162 people in 65 households, by which time the district had been separated from the county with the establishment of Davarzan County. The rural district was transferred to the new Central District. It was the most populous village in its rural district.
