= Sad Kharv =

Village in Razavi Khorasan province, Iran

Sad Kharv Persian: صدخرو
- Village
- Location within Iran
- Coordinates: 36°18′29″N 57°04′26″E
- Province: Razavi Khorasan
- County: Davarzan
- District: Central
- Rural District: Kah

Population (2016)
  - Total: 2,670
- Time zone: UTC+3:30 (IRST)

Sad Kharv (Persian: صدخرو) (Note: Also romanized as Sad Kharu, Şad Kharv, and Sadd-e Kharū; also known as Sūdkhārv) is a village in, and the capital of, Kah Rural District in the Central District of Davarzan County, Razavi Khorasan province, Iran.

== Demographics ==
=== Population ===
At the time of the 2006 National Census, the village's population was 2,296 in 753 households, when it was in the former Davarzan District of Sabzevar County. The following census in 2011 counted 2,623 people in 891 households. The 2016 census measured the population of the village as 2,670 people in 963 households, by which time the district had been separated from the county in the establishment of Davarzan County. The rural district was transferred to the new Central District. Sad Kharv was the most populous village in its rural district.
