= Keyf =

Village in Razavi Khorasan province, Iran

Keyf Persian: كيف
- Village
- Location within Iran
- Coordinates: 36°18′50″N 57°19′40″E
- Country: Iran
- Province: Razavi Khorasan
- County: Davarzan
- District: Bashtin
- Rural District: Bashtin

Population (2016)
  - Total: 107
- Time zone: UTC+3:30 (IRST)

Keyf (Persian: كيف) is a village in Bashtin Rural District of Bashtin District in Davarzan County, Razavi Khorasan province, Iran.

== Demographics ==
=== Population ===
At the time of the 2006 National Census, the village's population was 89 in 21 households, when it was in the former Davarzan District of Sabzevar County. The following census in 2011 counted 72 people in 21 households. The 2016 census measured the population of the village as 107 people in 33 households, by which time the district had been separated from the county in the establishment of Davarzan County. The rural district was transferred to the new Bashtin District.
