= Khurasan Road =

Historical highway in Asia

The (Great) Khurasan Road was the great trunk road connecting Mesopotamia to the Iranian Plateau and thence to Central Asia, China, and the Indus Valley.

It is very well-documented in the Abbasid period, when it connected the core of the capital city of Baghdad with the northeastern province of Khurasan.

== History ==
Archaeological findings suggest the road was in regular use in the 3rd millennium BC, connecting Central Asia with Mesopotamia. During the Achaemenid period, the road constituted the eastern segment of the Royal Road system.

== Course ==
The Achaemenid road began from the Median capital city of Ecbatana and terminated at the Central Asian city of Bactra (Balkh), passing through Rhagae (Rey), the Caspian Gates (modern Tang-e Sar-e Darra), Hyrcania, and Parthia. The Grand Trunk Road connected Bactra to the Indus Valley.

Map of the Khurasan Road from Baghdad to Rayy, according to Ibn Khordadbeh, with distances in farsakhs

The Khurasan Road is possibly the best documented of the roads of the Abbasid realm; not only is it described in detail by Ibn Rustah, but most other medieval Muslim geographers such as Qudama ibn Ja'far and Ibn Khordadbeh refer to it and give distances along its various stretches in their works. The road began at the Khurasan Gate on the eastern side of the Round City of al-Mansur, and exited the city at the second Khurasan Gate of East Baghdad.

Map of the road from Ray to Nishapur, with distances in farsakhs

The first settlement after Baghdad was Nahrawan or Jisr Nahrawan ("Bridge of Nahrawan"), named after the great Nahrawan Canal which passed through it. In the Abbasid period it was prosperous, but was abandoned and fell in ruin when the road moved north to Ba'quba. The surrounding district was known as Ṭarīq-i-Khurāsān after the Khurasan Road. The next town was known in Arabic as Daskarah al-Malik ("Daskara of the King"), and is identified with Sassanian-era Dastagird. Then followed Jalula, near which a large Sasanian-era bridge crossed the Diyala River, and Khaniqin, also the site of a major bridge, and Qasr Sjirin, the "Castle of Shirin", named after the wife of the Sasanian shah Khosrow II. At Hulwan, the road left the Mesopotamian plain and entered the Zagros Mountains and the province of Jibal. The road continued to Madharustan and finally exited the Hulwan pass at the town of Kirind and the village of Khushan. Then followed Tazar or Qasr Yazid and al-Zubaydiya, where the road turned east towards Kirmanshah across the plain of Mayidasht or Mahidasht. On most of these localities, the Muslim geographers record the presence of remnants of Sasanian palaces. From Kirmanshah the road continued to Hamadan and Sivah, turned north to Rayy, and from there passed east into the province of Qumis. The road was the main lifeline of Qumis, and most of the province's towns were located along its course: Khuwar, Qasr or Qariyat al-Milh (the "Salt Castle"), Ras al-Kalb ("Dog's Head", identifiable with Lasgird), Samnan, Damghan, al-Haddadah ("the Forge") or Mihman-Dust, and Bistam. Near Bistam, at the village of Badhash, the road entered Khurasan.

Map of Khurasan and Transoxiana in the early Islamic period

After entering Khurasan, the road divided in two: a northern branch, also called the "caravan road", leading to Jajarm, and thence via Azadvar to Nishapur, and a shorter southern branch or "post road" along the edge of the Dasht-e Kavir desert, via Asadabad, Bahmanabad or Mazinan, and Sabzivar, again to Nishapur. Shortly after Nishapur, at Qasr al-Rih ("Castle of the Wind"), the road divided again into two branches leading southwest and northeast. The southwestern branch led to Herat, from where it branched out further, with roads leading east to Ghur, or via Asfuzar and Farah south to Zaranj in Sijistan. The northeastern branch of the main road led from Qasr al-Rih via Mashhad, Tus, Mazdaran, and Sarakhs to Marw the Great and Marw al-Rudh. From Marw the Great the road continued to the crossing of the Oxus River at Amul and on to Bukhara and Samarkand. From Marw al-Rudh a branch led south to Herat, while another went northeast to Balkh and, likewise crossing the Oxus, to Tirmidh, whence it branched out to various roads into the districts of Saghaniyan and Khuttal, while another branch led west to Bukhara and Samarkand. From Amul, another branch also led along the southern bank of the Oxus to Khwarizm and the Aral Sea. From Samarkand, the road crossed the Sughd River and led to the town of Zamin in Usrushana, east of the local capital, Bunjikath. There the road divided again, with one branch leading north to Shash and the lower course of the Jaxartes, and the other east to the upper course of the Jaxartes, the Ferghana Valley and China.

== See also ==
- Great Trunk Road
- Royal Road
- Silk Road

== Sources ==
- Briant, Pierre (2002). From Cyrus to Alexander: A History of the Persian Empire. Eisenbrauns. ISBN 978-1-57506-120-7.
- Le Strange, Guy (1905). The Lands of the Eastern Caliphate: Mesopotamia, Persia, and Central Asia, from the Moslem Conquest to the Time of Timur. New York: Barnes & Noble, Inc. OCLC 1044046.
