= Bashtin, Razavi Khorasan =

Village in Razavi Khorasan province, Iran

Bashtin Persian: باشتين
- Village
- Location within Iran
- Coordinates: 36°09′57″N 57°20′03″E
- Country: Iran
- Province: Razavi Khorasan
- County: Davarzan
- District: Bashtin
- Rural District: Bashtin

Population (2016)
  - Total: 681
- Time zone: UTC+3:30 (IRST)

Bashtin (Persian: باشتين) (Note: Also romanized as Bāshtīn; also known as Sarbedār) is a village in Bashtin Rural District of Bashtin District in Davarzan County, Razavi Khorasan province, Iran.

== Demographics ==
=== Population ===
At the time of the 2006 National Census, the village's population was 953 in 281 households, when it was in the former Davarzan District of Sabzevar County. The following census in 2011 counted 836 people in 308 households. The 2016 census measured the population of the village as 681 people in 264 households, by which time the district had been separated from the county in the establishment of Davarzan County. The rural district was transferred to the new Bashtin District.
