= Kamiz =

Village in Razavi Khorasan province, Iran

Kamiz Persian: كميز
- Village
- Location within Iran
- Coordinates: 36°24′25″N 57°03′02″E
- Province: Razavi Khorasan
- County: Davarzan
- District: Central
- Rural District: Kah

Population (2016)
  - Total: 605
- Time zone: UTC+3:30 (IRST)

Kamiz (Persian: كميز) (Note: Also romanized as Kamīz and Kemīz; also known as Kambīz and Kūmīz) is a village in Kah Rural District of the Central District in Davarzan County, Razavi Khorasan province, Iran.

== Demographics ==
=== Population ===
At the time of the 2006 National Census, the village's population was 787 in 233 households, when it was in the former Davarzan District of Sabzevar County. The following census in 2011 counted 644 people in 226 households. The 2016 census measured the population of the village as 605 people in 224 households, by which time the district had been separated from the county in the establishment of Davarzan County. The rural district was transferred to the new Central District.
