= Beng, Razavi Khorasan =

Village in Razavi Khorasan province, Iran

Beng Persian: بنگ
- Village
- Location within Iran
- Coordinates: 36°23′59″N 57°04′28″E
- Province: Razavi Khorasan
- County: Davarzan
- District: Central
- Rural District: Kah

Population (2016)
  - Total: Below reporting threshold
- Time zone: UTC+3:30 (IRST)

Beng (Persian: بنگ) is a village in Kah Rural District of the Central District in Davarzan County, Razavi Khorasan province, Iran.

== Demographics ==
=== Population ===
At the time of the 2006 National Census, the village's population was 11 in five households, when it was in the former Davarzan District of Sabzevar County. The village did not appear in the following census of 2011. The 2016 census measured the population of the village as below the reporting threshold, by which time the district had been separated from the county in the establishment of Davarzan County. The rural district was transferred to the new Central District.
