= Mazinan =

Village in Razavi Khorasan province, Iran

Mazinan Persian: مزينان
- Village
- Location within Iran
- Coordinates: 36°18′31″N 56°48′57″E
- Country: Iran
- Province: Razavi Khorasan
- County: Davarzan
- District: Central
- Rural District: Mazinan

Population (2016)
  - Total: 1,661
- Time zone: UTC+3:30 (IRST)

Mazinan (Persian: مزينان) (Note: Also romanized as Mazīnān; also known as Darwazān) is a village in Mazinan Rural District of the Central District in Davarzan County, Razavi Khorasan province, Iran.

== Demographics ==
=== Population ===
At the time of the 2006 National Census, the village's population was 1,515 in 509 households, when it was in the former Davarzan District of Sabzevar County. The following census in 2011 counted 1,408 people in 483 households. The 2016 census measured the population of the village as 1,661 people in 615 households, by which time the district had been separated from the county with the establishment of Davarzan County. The rural district was transferred to the new Central District. It was the most populous village in its rural district.

== Notable people ==
Ali Shariati (1933–1977), born Ali Mazinani, was from this village
