= Rivand, Davarzan =

Village in Razavi Khorasan province, Iran

Rivand Persian: ريوند
- Village
- Location within Iran
- Coordinates: 36°13′55″N 57°20′15″E
- Country: Iran
- Province: Razavi Khorasan
- County: Davarzan
- District: Bashtin
- Rural District: Bashtin

Population (2016)
  - Total: 1,034
- Time zone: UTC+3:30 (IRST)

Rivand (Persian: ريوند) (Note: Also romanized as Rīvand) is a village in Bashtin Rural District of Bashtin District in Davarzan County, Razavi Khorasan province, Iran, serving as capital of both the district and the rural district.

== Demographics ==
=== Population ===
During the 2006 National Census, the village's population was recorded at 997 residents in 322 households, when it was in the former Davarzan District of Sabzevar County. In the subsequent 2011 census, the population was counted at 884 residents in 304 households. The 2016 census measured the village's population as 1,034 people in 384 households, by which time the district had been separated from the county in the establishment of Davarzan County. The rural district was transferred to the new Bashtin District.
