= KEYF =

KEYF may refer to:

- KEYF-FM, a radio station (101.1 FM) licensed to serve Cheney, Washington, United States
- KFIO (AM), a radio station (1050 AM) licensed to serve Dishman, Washington, which held the call sign KEYF from 1984 to 2001 and from 2004 to 2016

== See also ==
- Keyf, a village in Iran
