= 267th Combat Communications Squadron =

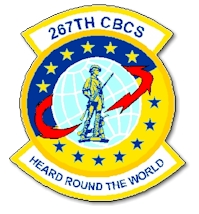
- 267th Combat Communications Squadron emblem
- Active: 1942–present
- Country: United States
- Branch: United States Air Force
- Type: Squadron
- Role: Combat Communications
- Part of: 281st Combat Communications Group/Massachusetts ANG
- Garrison/HQ: Otis ANGB, Massachusetts
- Motto: "Heard Round the World"
- Engagements: Operation Desert Shield, Operation Desert Storm, Operation Enduring Freedom, Operation Iraqi Freedom

The United States Air Force's 267th Combat Communications Squadron (267 CBCS) is an Air National Guard combat communications unit located at Otis Air National Guard Base, Massachusetts.

== Mission ==
To be prepared for the challenges of providing global communications in constantly changing environments.

== History ==
=== Origins ===
The 267th Combat Communications Squadron's lineage begins as a part of the Army Air Corps, as the 301st Signal Company, Wing, on 1 December 1942 at Pinedale California. The 301st Signal Company was subsequently assigned to the Fourth Air Force for training, and later transferred to Foreign Service on 21 August 1943. The 301st arrived in North Africa on 4 September 1943 and redeployed to Italy on 25 April 1944. The unit was assigned to the 304th Bombardment Wing, Heavy, on 21 June 1945. During this period, the 301st's mission was providing reliable communications to fighters and bombers. After the war, the 301st was transferred back to the United States and was inactivated on 13 October 1945 at Camp Shanks, New York.

=== Post World War II ===
On 24 May 1946, the 301st Signal Company, Wing, was redesignated as the 101st Communications Squadron and assigned to the newly created United States Air Force and Air National Guard. The squadron was extended federal recognition on 8 December 1947 at the Commonwealth Armory, Boston, Massachusetts.

=== Cold War ===
Once established as a Massachusetts National Guard unit, the 101st Communications Squadron was assigned to the 67th Fighter Wing to provide the necessary communications link between Wing Headquarters and its subordinate flying units during annual field training. Its mission involved the technical training of assigned personnel at various Air Force installations in the Northeast. During this period, the unit moved from Commonwealth Armory to the Somerville Armory (1 January 1952) and was redesignated as the 267th Communications Squadron (Operations) (1 July 1952).

With the return of Air National Guard units from the Korean War, the Headquarters 253rd Communications Group (Mobile) was organized and collocated with the 267th Communications Squadron. The 253rd remains the 267th's Group Headquarters to this day. Exercises planned by the 253rd Communications Group continued to improve the 267ths capabilities with expanding communications resources. Both the Headquarters and Squadron were relocated from Somerville to Logan International Airport, East Boston (20 August 1954), and then from Logan to Fiske School, Cedar Street Wellesley, Massachusetts (1 September 1955).

A milestone in 267th and 253rd history was June 1960 when both units moved to the Wellesley Air National Guard Station. Wellesley Air National Guard Station would be home to the 267th for 36 years.

In October 1960 the 267th's capabilities increased with the arrival of the new Technical Control and Relay Center facilities. The 267th Communications Squadron was the first Air National Guard unit to join the Air Force Space Surveillance Team with the acquisition of a Doppler Satellite Tracking System in December 1960. The unit functioned as a Doppler Tracking Station until 1963. In 1963, a new wing was added to the Wellesley Air National Guard Station to accommodate its growing mission and training requirements in support of tactical operations.

The 1970s saw the 267th build on past experience and expand its role as a communications unit. Updated equipment and a focus on training helped develop the 267th into a modern mobile communications unit. The 267th received numerous equipment updates during this time period and personnel strength increased along with the mission.

The force modernization concept of the 1980s provided many new challenges to the 267th. Under force modernization, the 267th had the capability to deploy anywhere in the world within 72 hours by air, sea, or land in order to provide tactical communications for a Theater Force Commander. During this time, participation in Joint Chief of Staff Exercises deployed the 267th to various parts of the United States and overseas.

The late 1980s saw change come once more – this time in the form of high-speed digital equipment. The Air Force had upgraded the tactical communications equipment from old analog systems to newer, more reliable digital systems. This change brought high-tech equipment into the Air Guard and once again the 267th led the way. In the Operational Readiness Inspection of 1990, the 267th was the first Air National Guard unit to deploy newly assigned digital equipment for a command inspection.

=== Post Cold War ===
In the early 1990s the 267th was called upon to support Desert Shield/Desert Storm. Numerous personnel were deployed to South West Asia. Throughout this mission, many members volunteered for duty in theater and were placed on augmentee listings, but due to the short nature of the war these members were never called upon to deploy.

During the late 1980s and early 1990s, numerous command changes occurred. For more than two decades the 267th had been under Air Force Communications Command. Changes within the Air Force, however, eliminated AFCC, and the 267th banner was moved to Tactical Air Command (TAC). Growth continued under TAC. Training with Active Duty counterparts allowed the 267th to continue supporting the Joint Chief of Staff exercises worldwide. Changes came again with the reorganization of the Air Force. TAC merged with Strategic Air Command (SAC) to form Air Combat Command (ACC), carrying the 267th to its third major command in as many years.

The end of the cold war and collapse of the Soviet Union generated a call for a major downsizing within the Department of Defense. The entire defense community was faced with dramatic departure from what had become the traditional mission. This brought about a new concept of operations. A prime example of the departure from the "old ways" was Operation Joint Endeavor, to which the 267th deployed personnel and equipment to Tazar, Hungary.

The 267th was downsized and restructured as a result of the Reduction in Force and new operational concepts. The 267th celebrated these changes by leaving its three and a half decade home Wellesley ANGS for its current station, a 7.1 million dollar, custom built facility on the Massachusetts Military Reservation (Otis Air National Guard Base) on Cape Cod.

=== Global War on Terror ===
Closed June 2016.

== Previous designations ==
- 267th Combat Communications Squadron ()
- 267th Communications Squadron (19xx-???)

== Bases stationed ==
- Otis ANGB, Massachusetts (1996–2016)
- Wellesley ANGS, Massachusetts (1960–1996)
