= Abrud (disambiguation) =

Abrud is a town in the north-western part of Alba County, Transylvania, Romania.

Abrud may also refer to:

== Places ==
=== Romania ===
- Abrud, a village in Adamclisi Commune, Constanța County
- Abrud (river), river in the Apuseni Mountains, Alba County

=== Iran ===
- Abrud, Gilan
- Abrud, Davarzan, Razavi Khorasan Province
- Abrud, Torbat-e Heydarieh, Razavi Khorasan Province
