= Kumiz =

Kumiz (Persian: كوميز) may refer to:

- Kumiz, Hormozgan
- Kumiz, Razavi Khorasan
