= Beng =

Beng may refer to:

== People ==
- Aaron Beng, Singaporean rear-admiral, Chief of Navy since 2020
- Kwek Leng Beng (born 1941), Singaporean billionaire
- Lim Eng Beng (1951–2015), former Philippine Basketball Association player
- Su Beng (1918–2019), Taiwanese dissident and political activist
- Beng Chin Ooi, Singaporean computer scientist
- Beng Climaco (born 1966), Filipino politician
- Beng Spies, voice actor

== Other uses ==
- Beng District, Oudomxay Province, Laos
- Beng, Razavi Khorasan, a village in Razavi Khorasan Province, Iran
- Beng language, a language in Côte d'Ivoire
- Bengali–Assamese script (ISO 15924 code)
