= Chesham (disambiguation) =

Chesham may refer to:

== Places ==
Canada

- Chesham River, a tributary of rivière au Saumon in Estrie, Quebec, Canada

England

- Chesham, Buckinghamshire
- Chesham Bois, Buckinghamshire
- Chesham Urban District, a former local government district in Buckinghamshire
- Chesham tube station, The London Underground station serving Chesham

Iran

- Chesham, Iran

United States

- Chesham, New Hampshire

== Companies ==
- Chesham Amalgamations, a mergers and acquisitions broker based in London
