= Mehr Rural District =

Rural district in Razavi Khorasan province, Iran

Mehr Rural District Persian: دهستان مهر
- Rural District
- Location within Iran
- Coordinates: 36°16′N 57°06′E
- Country: Iran
- Province: Razavi Khorasan
- County: Davarzan
- District: Bashtin
- Established: 2012
- Capital: Mehr

Population (2016)
  - Total: 5,673
- Time zone: UTC+3:30 (IRST)

Mehr Rural District (Persian: دهستان مهر) is in Bashtin District of Davarzan County, Razavi Khorasan province, Iran. Its capital is the village of Mehr.

== History ==
In 2012, Davarzan District was separated from Sabzevar County in the establishment of Davarzan County, and Mehr Rural District was created in the new Bashtin District.

== Demographics ==
=== Population ===
At the time of the 2016 National Census, the rural district's population was 5,673 in 1,868 households. The most populous of its 23 villages was Mehr, with 1,812 people.

=== Other villages in the rural district ===
- Bohangar
- Borughan
- Chesham
- Hoseynabad
- Kalateh-ye Sadat-e Bala
- Kushk-e Bagh
- Mehrabad
- Moqiseh
- Shahrabad
- Tazar
