= Mazinan Rural District =

Rural district in Razavi Khorasan province, Iran

Mazinan Rural District Persian: دهستان مزينان
- Rural District
- Location within Iran
- Coordinates: 36°20′N 56°53′E
- Country: Iran
- Province: Razavi Khorasan
- County: Davarzan
- District: Central
- Established: 1987
- Capital: Davarzan

Population (2016)
  - Total: 5,432
- Time zone: UTC+3:30 (IRST)

Mazinan Rural District (Persian: دهستان مزينان) is in the Central District of Davarzan County, Razavi Khorasan province, Iran. It is administered from the city of Davarzan.

== Demographics ==
=== Population ===
At the time of the 2006 National Census, the rural district's population (as a part of the former Davarzan District in Sabzevar County) was 6,064 in 1,824 households. There were 5,542 inhabitants in 1,859 households at the following census of 2011. The 2016 census measured the population of the rural district as 5,432 in 1,976 households, by which time the district had been separated from the county in the establishment of Davarzan County. The rural district was transferred to the new Central District. The most populous of its 22 villages was Mazinan, with 1,661 people.

=== Other villages in the rural district ===
- Abrud
- Aliabad-e Bala
- Bahmanabad
- Bizeh
- Deh Now
- Ghaniabad
- Kahak
- Kalateh-ye Mazinan
- Mur
- Nahaldan
- Seviz
