= Mehr Caravanserai =

UNESCO World Heritage Site in Iran

- کاروانسرای مهر
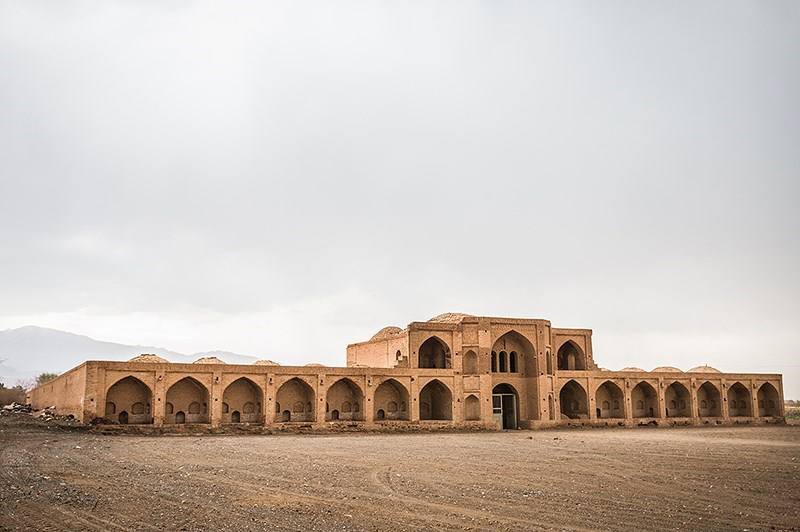
- Interactive map of the Mehr Caravanserai area

General information
- Location: Mehr, Iran

UNESCO World Heritage Site
- Part of: The Persian Caravanserai
- Criteria: Cultural: ii, iii
- Reference: 1668-020
- Inscription: 2023 (45th Session)

Mehr Caravanserai (Persian: کاروانسرای مهر) is a historic caravanserai belonging to the Qajar era in Mehr, Razavi Khorasan province, Iran.

It was listed among the national heritage sites of Iran with the number 1660 on 16 September 1984.

== Gallery ==
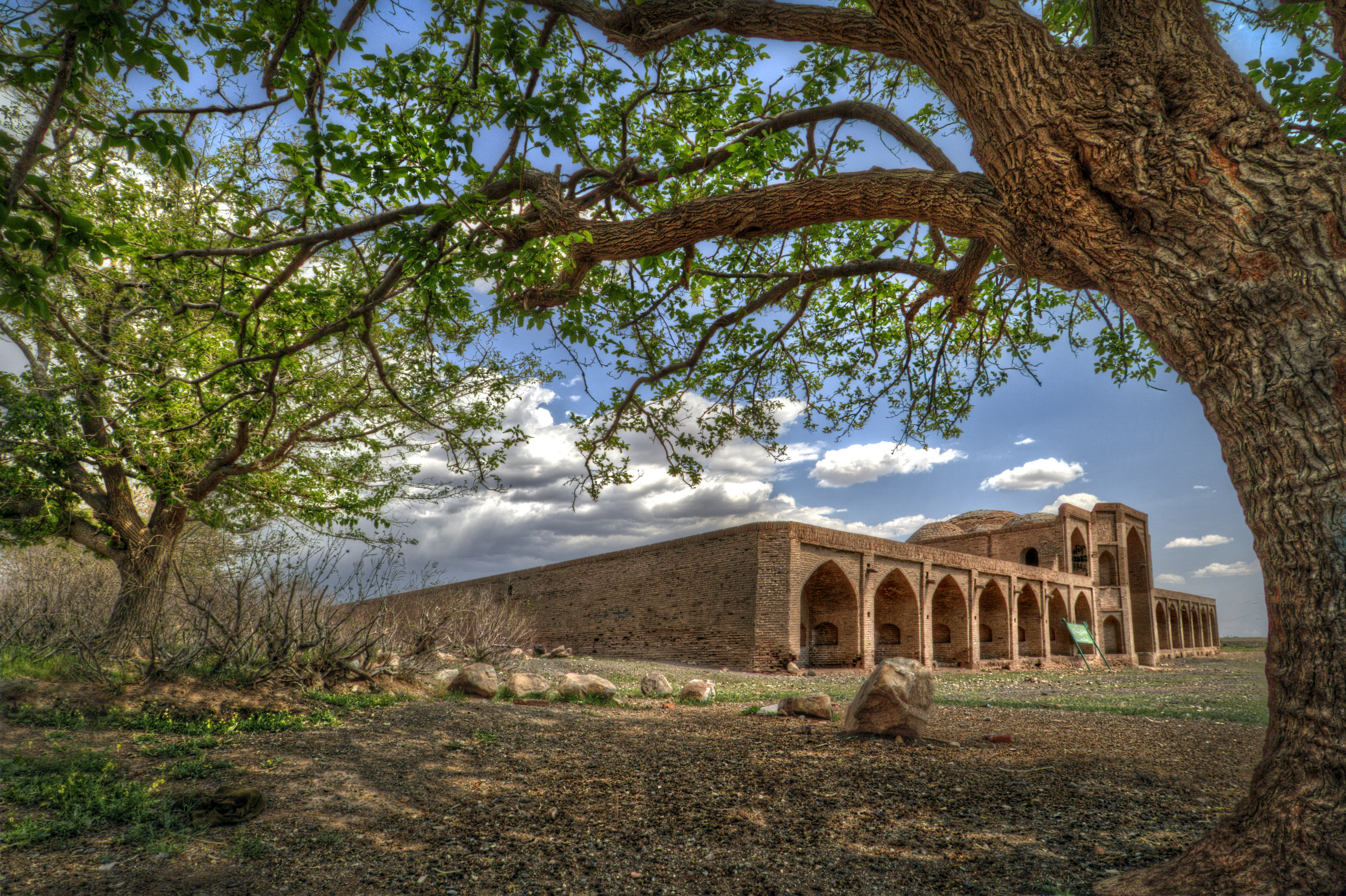

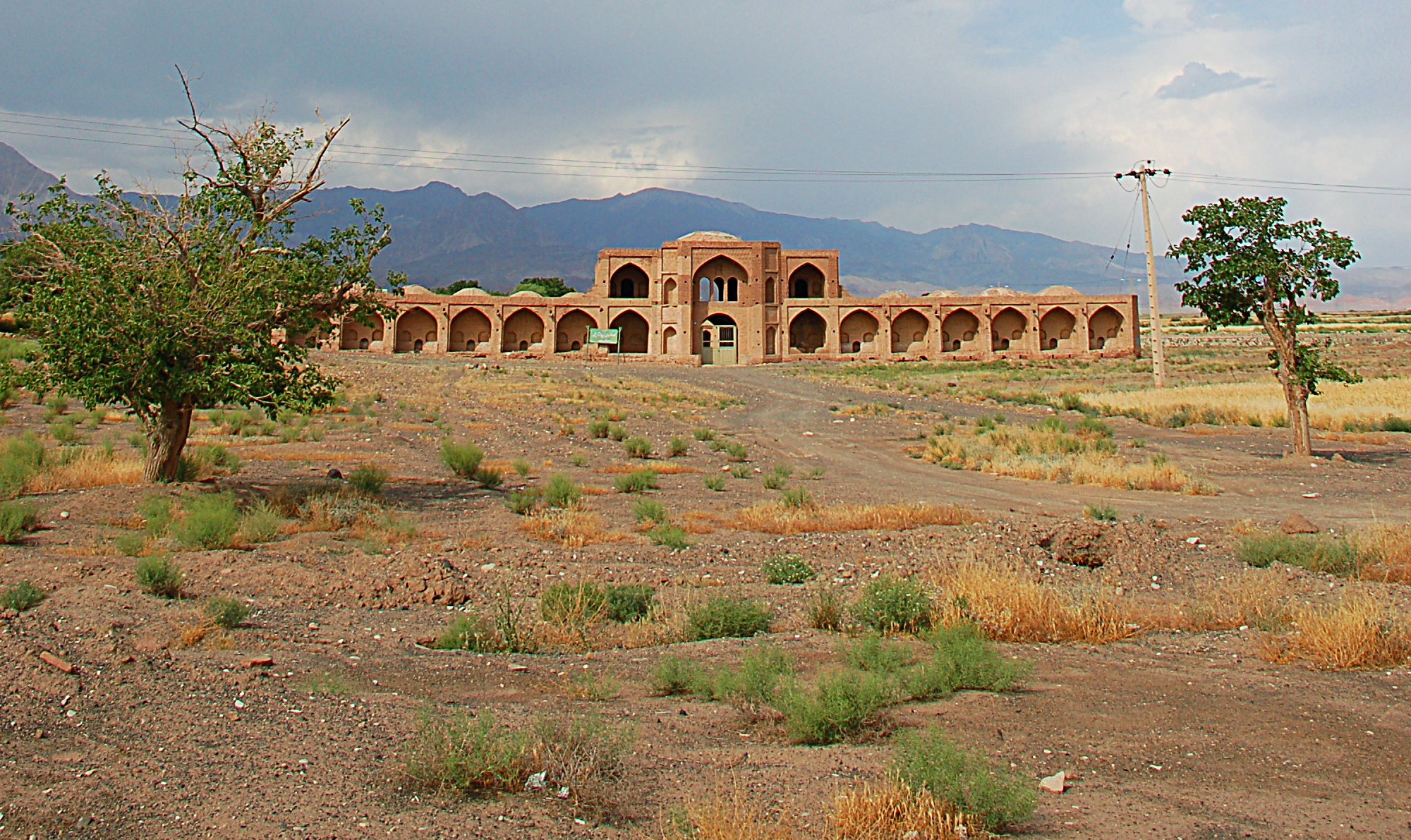

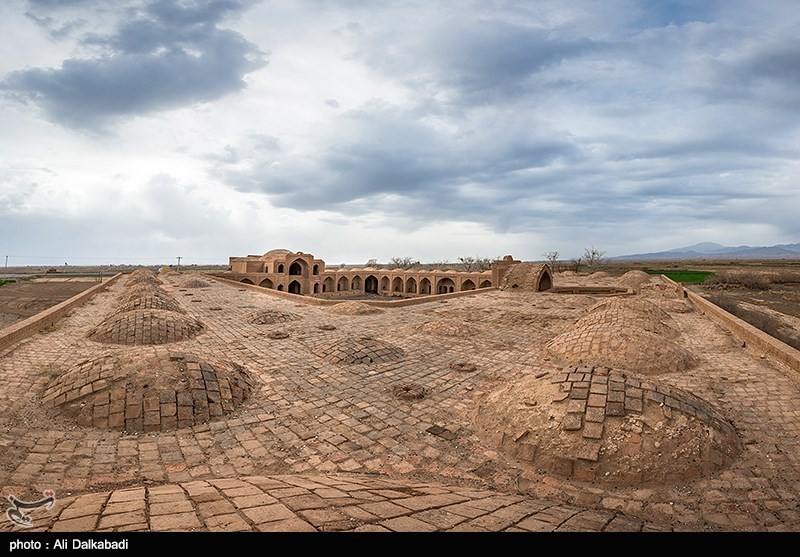

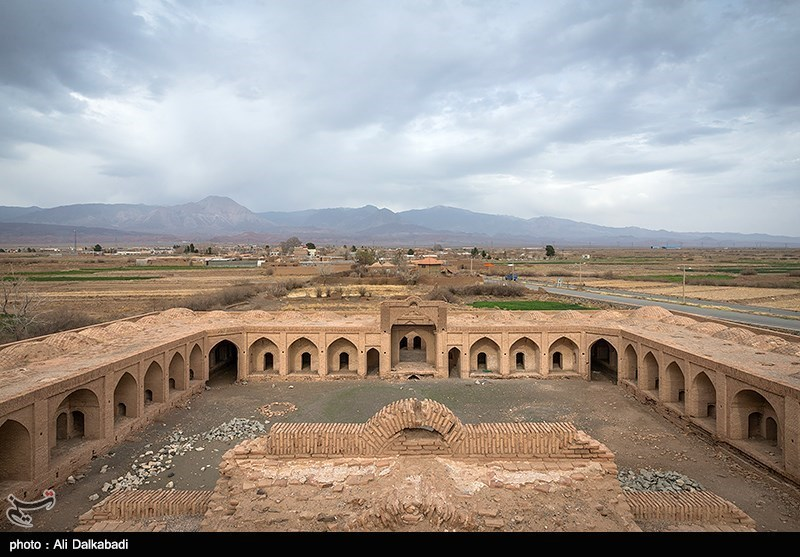
