= Davarzan =

City in Razavi Khorasan Province, Iran

Davarzan Persian: داورزن
- City
- Location within Iran
- Coordinates: 36°21′02″N 56°52′33″E
- Country: Iran
- Province: Razavi Khorasan
- County: Davarzan
- District: Central
- Established as a city: 1996

Population (2016)
  - Total: 2,744
- Time zone: UTC+3:30 (IRST)

Davarzan (Persian: داورزن) (Note: Also romanized as Dāvarzan; also known as Duvarzān) is a city in the Central District of Davarzan County, Razavi Khorasan Province, Iran, serving as capital of both the county and the district. It is also the administrative center for Mazinan Rural District. The village of Davarzan was converted to a city in 1996.

== Demographics ==
=== Population ===
At the time of the 2006 National Census, the city's population was 2,387 in 705 households, when it was capital of the former Davarzan District in Sabzevar County. The following census in 2011 counted 2,702 people in 859 households. The 2016 census measured the population of the city as 2,744 people in 885 households, by which time the district had been separated from the county in the establishment of Davarzan County. The city was transferred to the new Central District as the county's capital.
