= Bashtin Rural District =

Rural district in Razavi Khorasan province, Iran

Bashtin Rural District Persian: دهستان باشتين
- Rural District
- Location within Iran
- Coordinates: 36°15′N 57°21′E
- Country: Iran
- Province: Razavi Khorasan
- County: Davarzan
- District: Bashtin
- Established: 1987
- Capital: Rivand

Population (2016)
  - Total: 4,291
- Time zone: UTC+3:30 (IRST)

Bashtin Rural District (Persian: دهستان باشتين) is in Bashtin District of Davarzan County, Razavi Khorasan province, Iran. Its capital is the village of Rivand.

== Demographics ==
=== Population ===
At the time of the 2006 National Census, the rural district's population (as a part of the former Davarzan District in Sabzevar County) was 5,424 in 1,684 households. There were 4,852 inhabitants in 1,745 households at the following census of 2011. The 2016 census measured the population of the rural district as 4,291 in 1,584 households, by which time the district had been separated from the county in the establishment of Davarzan County. The rural district was transferred to the new Bashtin District. The most populous of its 21 villages was Naman, with 1,175 people.

=== Other villages in the rural district ===
- Baghesht
- Bashtin
- Feyzabad
- Foshtanaq
- Keyf
- Saruq
- Shahr-e Ayin
- Tajabad
- Zard Kuh
