= Kah Rural District =

Rural district in Razavi Khorasan province, Iran

Kah Rural District Persian: دهستان كاه
- Rural District
- Location within Iran
- Coordinates: 36°19′N 57°00′E
- Country: Iran
- Province: Razavi Khorasan
- County: Davarzan
- District: Central
- Established: 1987
- Capital: Sad Kharv

Population (2016)
  - Total: 3,771
- Time zone: UTC+3:30 (IRST)

Kah Rural District (Persian: دهستان كاه) is in the Central District of Davarzan County, Razavi Khorasan province, Iran. Its capital is the village of Sad Kharv.

== Demographics ==
=== Population ===
At the time of the 2006 National Census, the rural district's population (as a part of the former Davarzan District in Sabzevar County) was 8,531 in 2,550 households. There were 8,213 inhabitants in 2,691 households at the following census of 2011. The 2016 census measured the population of the rural district as 3,771 in 1,365 households, by which time the district had been separated from the county in the establishment of Davarzan County. The rural district was transferred to the new Central District. The most populous of its 42 villages was Sad Kharv, with 2,670 people.

=== Other villages in the rural district ===
- Baqerabad
- Beng
- Chubin
- Kamiz
- Khosrowabad
