= Bashtin District =

District in Razavi Khorasan province, Iran

Bashtin District Persian: بخش باشتين
- District
- Location within Iran
- Coordinates: 36°16′N 57°13′E
- Country: Iran
- Province: Razavi Khorasan
- County: Davarzan
- Established: 2012
- Capital: Rivand

Population (2016)
  - Total: 9,964
- Time zone: UTC+3:30 (IRST)

Bashtin District (Persian: بخش باشتين) is in Davarzan County, Razavi Khorasan province, Iran. Its capital is the village of Rivand.

== History ==
In 2012, Davarzan District was separated from Sabzevar County in the establishment of Davarzan County, which was divided into two districts of two rural districts each, with Davarzan as its capital and only city at the time.

== Demographics ==
=== Population ===
At the time of the 2016 National Census, the district's population was 9,964 inhabitants in 3,452 households.

=== Administrative divisions ===
Bashtin District Population
Administrative Divisions	2016
Bashtin Rural District	4,291
Mehr Rural District	5,673
Total	9,964
RD = Rural District
