= Central District (Davarzan County) =

District in Razavi Khorasan province, Iran

Central District (Davarzan County) Persian: بخش مرکزی شهرستان داورزن
- District
- Location within Iran
- Coordinates: 36°19′N 56°57′E
- Country: Iran
- Province: Razavi Khorasan
- County: Davarzan
- Established: 2012
- Capital: Davarzan

Population (2016)
  - Total: 11,947
- Time zone: UTC+3:30 (IRST)

The Central District of Davarzan County (Persian: بخش مرکزی شهرستان داورزن) is in Razavi Khorasan province, Iran. Its capital is the city of Davarzan.

== History ==
In 2012, Davarzan District was separated from Sabzevar County in the establishment of Davarzan County, which was divided into two districts of two rural districts each, with Davarzan as its capital and only city at the time.

== Demographics ==
=== Population ===
At the time of the 2016 National Census, the district's population was 11,947 inhabitants in 4,226 households.

=== Administrative divisions ===
Central District (Davarzan County) Population
Administrative Divisions	2016
Kah RD	3,771
Mazinan RD	5,432
Davarzan (city)	2,744
Total	11,947
RD = Rural District
