= Davarzan County =

County in Razavi Khorasan Province, Iran

Davarzan County Persian: شهرستان داورزن
- County
- Location of Davarzan County in Razavi Khorasan province (left, yellow)

- Location of Razavi Khorasan province in Iran
- Coordinates: 36°18′N 57°06′E
- Country: Iran
- Province: Razavi Khorasan
- Established: 2012
- Capital: Davarzan
- Districts: Central, Bashtin

Area
  - Total: 2,420 km^{2} (930 sq mi)

Population (2016)
  - Total: 21,911
  - Density: 9.05/km^{2} (23.5/sq mi)
- Time zone: UTC+3:30 (IRST)

Davarzan County (Persian: شهرستان داورزن) is in Razavi Khorasan province, Iran. Its capital is the city of Davarzan.

== History ==
In 2012, Davarzan District was separated from Sabzevar County in the establishment of Davarzan County, which was divided into two districts of two rural districts each, with Davarzan as its capital and only city at the time.

== Demographics ==
=== Population ===
At the time of the 2016 National Census, the county's population was 21,911 in 7,678 households.

=== Administrative divisions ===
Davarzan County's population and administrative structure are shown in the following table.

Davarzan County Population
Administrative Divisions	2016
Central District	11,947
Kah RD	3,771
Mazinan RD	5,432
Davarzan (city)	2,744
Bashtin District	9,964
Bashtin RD	4,291
Mehr RD	5,673
Total	21,911
RD = Rural District

== See also ==
Media related to Davarzan County at Wikimedia Commons
