= Davarzan District =

Former district in Razavi Khorasan province, Iran

Davarzan District Persian: بخش داورزن
- Former District
- Location within Iran
- Coordinates: 36°18′N 57°06′E
- Country: Iran
- Province: Razavi Khorasan
- County: Sabzevar
- Capital: Davarzan

Population (2011)
  - Total: 21,309
- Time zone: UTC+3:30 (IRST)

Davarzan District (Persian: بخش داورزن) is a former administrative division of Sabzevar County, Razavi Khorasan province, Iran. Its capital was the city of Davarzan.

== History ==
In 2012, the district was separated from the county in the establishment of Davarzan County.

== Demographics ==
=== Population ===
At the time of the 2006 National Census, the district's population was 22,406 in 6,763 households. The following census in 2011 counted 21,309 people in 7,154 households.

=== Administrative divisions ===
Davarzan District Population
Administrative Divisions	2006	2011
Bashtin RD	5,424	4,852
Kah RD	8,531	8,213
Mazinan RD	6,064	5,542
Davarzan (city)	2,387	2,702
Total	22,406	21,309
RD = Rural District
