= Adobe Creek (Santa Clara County) =

Stream in Santa Clara County, California

Adobe Creek Arroyo San Antonio (San Antonio Creek), Arroyo de las Yeguas (Yeguas Creek)
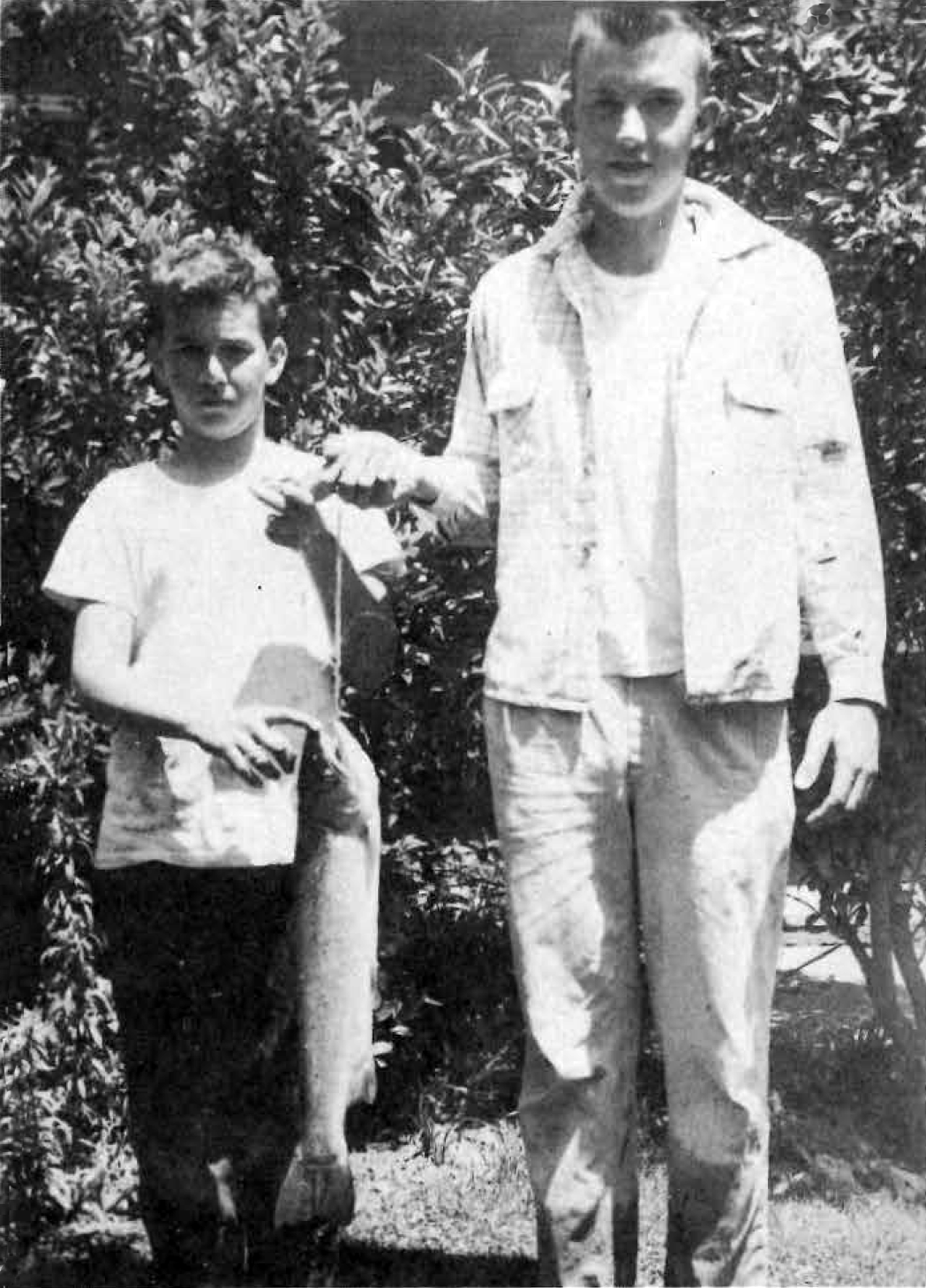
- 27 inch steelhead trout caught by boys on Adobe Creek in June 1956, near Van Buren Avenue, Los Altos, California. Courtesy of Los Altos History Museum.

- Location of the mouth of Adobe Creek in Palo Alto, California

Location
- Country: United States
- State: California
- Region: Santa Clara County
- Municipality: Los Altos Hills, Los Altos & Palo Alto, California

Physical characteristics
- Source: Black Mountain in the Santa Cruz Mountains
  - location: Los Altos Hills, California
  - coordinates: 37°19′12″N 122°09′19″W
  - elevation: 2,600 ft (790 m)
- Mouth: Palo Alto Flood Basin in southwest San Francisco Bay
  - location: Palo Alto, California
  - coordinates: 37°27′10″N 122°05′29″W
  - elevation: 0 ft (0 m)

Basin features
- Tributaries
  - left: Middle, West and North Forks Adobe Creek, Moody Creek, Purisima Creek, Robleda Creek, Barron Creek

Adobe Creek [əˈdoʊbiː], historically San Antonio Creek, is a 14.2-mile-long (22.9 km) northward-flowing stream originating on Black Mountain in the Santa Cruz Mountains. It courses through the cities of Los Altos Hills, Los Altos, and Palo Alto on its way to the Palo Alto Flood Basin and thence to southwestern San Francisco Bay in Santa Clara County, California, United States. Historically, Adobe Creek was a perennial stream and hosted runs of steelhead trout entering from the Bay, but these salmonids are now blocked by numerous flood control structures, including a tidal gate at the creek's mouth and a long concretized rectangular channel culminating in an impassable drop structure at El Camino Real. The co-founders of Adobe Systems both lived on Adobe Creek.

The 1862 map by George Allardt for The San Francisco & San Jose Railroad shows the historic dual connections of Adobe Creek to the San Francisco Bay tidal marsh and a dual connection to San Francisquito Creek. Crosby's Creek now known as Matadero Creek, appeared to end in or near the tidal marsh.

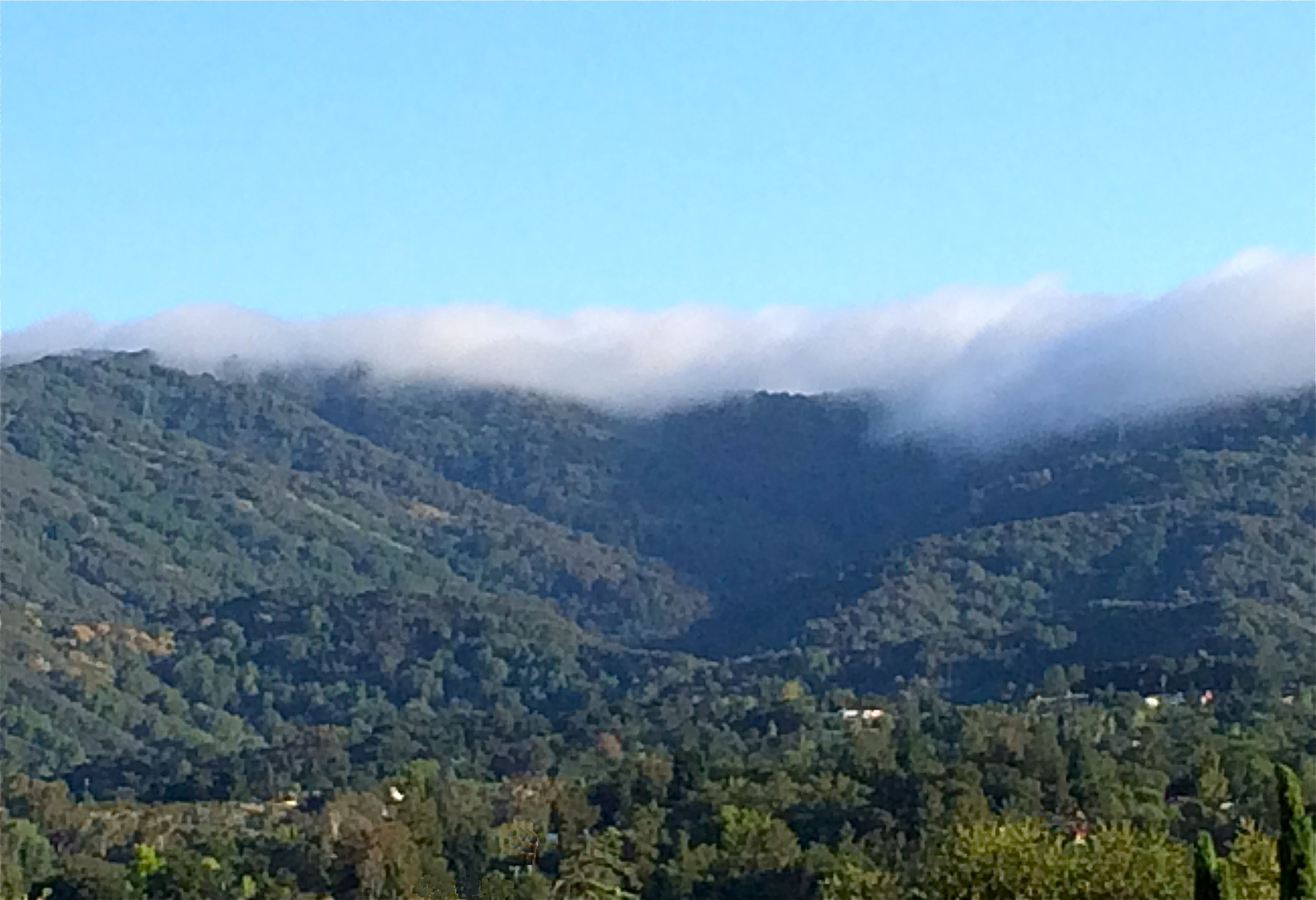
Fog on Black Mountain over the Adobe Creek headwaters. As the coast redwoods forest returns to the summit, it may add significant precipitation to the watershed via fog drip.

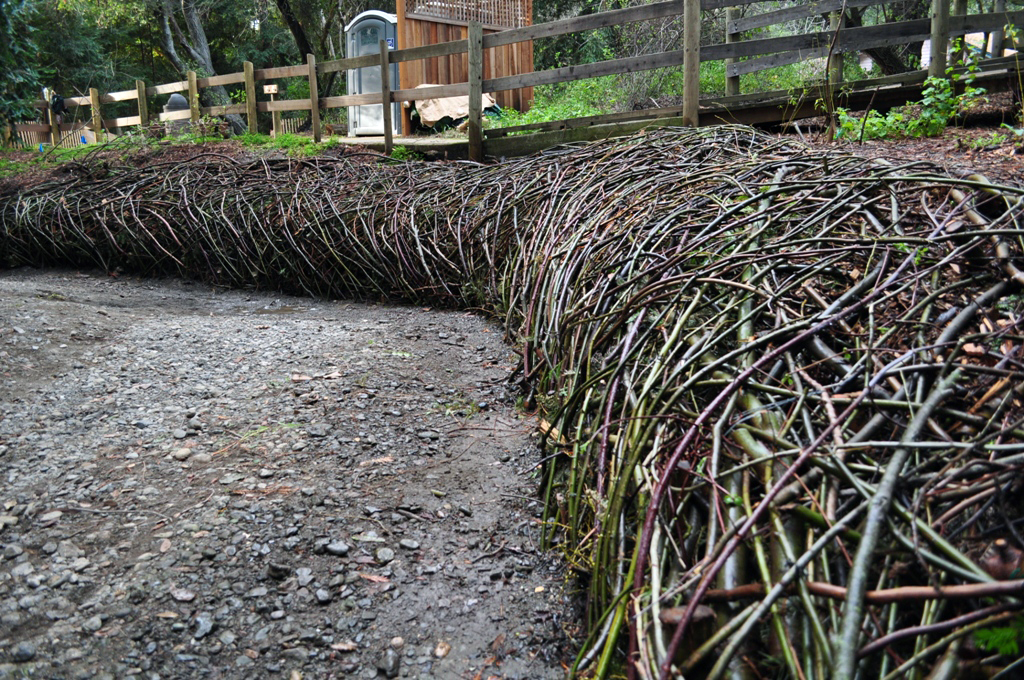
"Thicket" is a watershed sculpture woven and shaped of willow and elderberry by Daniel McCormick and Mary O'Brien. This living art stabilizes a creek bank in Redwood Grove and slows flows unlike concrete or gabion retaining walls.

== History ==
The Ohlone people were the original inhabitants of Adobe Creek. A large shell mound which once had a group of Indian huts was found near Adobe Creek in Palo Alto. Evidence of a smaller settlement within Los Altos was uncovered in 1971, when an Ohlone burial ground with skeletons—one with ceremonial beads—was uncovered by new construction along Adobe Creek near O'Keefe Lane. The site had other artifacts, and an archeological dig was mounted by Foothill College in 1970. Around this same time, an Ohlone basket was discovered buried in the Creek bank further north. The O'Keefe site has a historical plaque at the entrance to Normandy Lane marking the historic site labeled "Ohlone Indian Village, Town of Los Altos Hills, Historical Site No. 1, Ohlone 10-L0-N11 Village Site Dedicated this day to the Ohlone People Whose ancestors made their homes here April 4, 1973. No. SCI-015. Presented by American Association of University Women of Los Altos". This Ohlone village site had an ideal location situated on the perennial reach of Adobe Creek between Interstate 280 and Foothill Expressway.

On the 1862 Allardt Map the upper creek is called Arroyo San Antonio (San Antonio Creek) and the lower creek is called Arroyo de las Yeguas (Yeguas Creek). Yeguas is Spanish for "mare", and the Mission Santa Clara named it that because they built a corral for mares along the creek's banks near the Bay. Juan Prado Mesa renamed it San Antonio Creek when he was granted Rancho San Antonio in 1839 by Governor Juan Bautista Alvarado. The Adobe Creek name appears as early as 1855 on an official surveyor's map, which lists both the Adobe and San Antonio names for the creek.

During the secularization of the missions in the 1830s, Alvarado parceled out much of their land to prominent Californios via land grants. Mesa was a soldier stationed at the Presidio of San Francisco who had become alfarez (officer in command) in 1837. He built a large square adobe, which lasted well into the twentieth century as a crumbling ruin long thought of as a fortification. The site today is on a hill on the southeast side of El Monte Avenue near Summerhill Avenue in Los Altos, California, most of which is located on the territory of the Rancho.

The upper creek originates in the historic Rancho La Purisima Concepcion, which was granted by Governor Alvarado in 1840 to Jose Gorgonio, an Indian living at Mission Santa Clara. Gorgonio moved to the west bank of Adobe Creek near Fremont Avenue in Los Altos Hills. Much of the town of Los Altos Hills, California was located on this Rancho. In 1844 Rancho La Purisima Concepcion was sold to Juana Briones de Miranda, whose family members had accompanied both the Gaspar de Portolà and the Juan Bautista de Anza Expeditions. Her uniquely constructed wood-framed, rammed-earth and adobe brick house, believed to have been built by American sailors who had deserted, is located at 4155 Old Adobe Road on the border between Palo Alto and Los Altos Hills, and is marked by a historical marker at the corner of Old Adobe Road and Old Trace Lane. Designated a California State Historical Landmark in 1954, the 160-year-old Juana Briones home was scheduled for demolition in 2007 because of damage to it by the Loma Prieta earthquake in 1989. In 2009, it still stands and has been recently documented with a Historic American Buildings Survey (HABS).

After 1831, Mexican rancho owners would logically erect their dwellings on or very near creeks. Locally, Juan Prado's adobe was near Adobe Creek & Juanita Briones' adobe was near Barron Creek. Because they were permanent features of the landscape, creeks were often used as Rancho boundaries. This was true locally, where the Mexican diseño show Adobe Creek as the boundary between Rancho San Antonio and Rancho La Purisima Concepcion. When Americans took over in 1850, speculators bought much of this land. Much of it initially became large self-contained ranches—typically running cattle & growing crops like wheat, barley & oats that required little or no irrigation. That changed in a few decades when it was discovered that orchards and vineyards could thrive here. Such agriculture of course used more water. Local land was cut progressively into smaller holdings, until most of it was subdivided as the population increased. This meant more and more wells, including large ones dug along Adobe Creek by early water companies to serve the little town of Los Altos. The water table inevitably shrank as a result, and alarms about this development appeared, at least as early as the 1920s. In the early 1930s, the Los Altos News reported that the water table, which stood at 120 feet in 1898, was now down to 335 feet.

The Trust for Hidden Villa is a nonprofit educational organization founded by Frank and Josephine Duveneck, who purchased most of the land comprising the upper Adobe Creek watershed in 1924. They opened Hidden Villa as a gathering place for discussion, reflection, and incubation of social reform. Over the following decades, the Duvenecks also established the first Hostel on the Pacific Coast (1937), the first multiracial summer camp (1945), and Hidden Villa's Environmental Education Program (1970), all on the creek's upper reaches.

Adobe Creek Lodge, an English country-style mansion, was built by Consolidated Chemicals vice-president Milton Haas in 1935. It was a destination resort in the 1940s. Bandleaders Jimmy Dorsey and Harry James played there.

John Warnock and Charles Geschke, the co-founders of the Adobe Systems software company, both lived next to Adobe Creek in Los Altos, and named their company after the creek.

The founder of Los Altos, Paul Shoup, picked a premium lot on Adobe Creek for his home from the ranch lands he helped purchase from Sarah Winchester that later became the community of Los Altos. The Paul Shoup House on Adobe Creek is the first property in Los Altos to be listed on the National Register of Historic Places.

== Watershed and course ==
Adobe Creek drains about 11 square miles (28 km^{2}), arising at 2,600 feet (790 m) on the northeastern flank of Black Mountain in Los Altos Hills, California. Adobe Creek was once a perennial stream, as evidenced by historical presence of steelhead trout (Oncorhynchus mykiss). Historically, lawsuits were filed to prevent diversion of creek water for irrigation because they caused the creek to run "dry certain seasons of the year". A 1919 lawsuit against upstream creek diversion for "alfalfa fields" and "hog wallows" reads: "From time immemorial...the waters of Adobe Creek have flowed into, over upon and through the lands...from Hidden Villa high in the hills, past the wonderful home gardens of Los Altos to the Santa Clara Valley and on to the sea...Charles K. Field mourns the loss of the song of the brook that made his garden with its rockery an enchanted spot; Shoup's children can no longer wade in the stream, because there is no stream to wade in; acres and acres of McCutchen's rhododendrons are now languishing and dying with unsatisfied thirst." This written record confirms oral histories taken by local historian Don McDonald that Adobe Creek used to flow year-round. It is also consistent with Eleanor Cranston Fowle Cameron's (the sister of Senator Alan Cranston was born in 1909 and they lived on Cypress Court, north of West Edith Avenue in Los Altos Hills) account that in her youth the creek was perennial and that her "father fished the steelhead that ran up from the Bay to the pool below the waterfall". Local lumberman, Herbert Bickell, reported catching steelhead year-round in Adobe Creek until the mid-1950s when the creek's flows became intermittent behind his home on Van Buren Street.

On March 1, 1973, the State Water Resources Board (SWRB is now the California Department of Water Resources) granted water rights to the Purissima Hills Water District to withdraw 2.0 cubic feet per second (cfs) from the perennial reach where the SWRB had documented flows of 3.0 cfs on August 12, 1970, despite protestations by Robert and Mary Stutz who had rights to withdraw 0.005 cfs at Elena and Moody Roads, and Roy and Penny Lave who had rights to withdraw 0.008 cfs near Manresa Way and University Avenue. Today the creek's perennial sections are above Hidden Villa and between Foothill Expressway and Interstate 280 above the Manresa Way bridge.

Adobe Creek's upper tributaries are, in order, the Middle Fork Adobe Creek, then immediately the West Fork Adobe Creek (the West Fork is known locally as Letcher Creek). Next the North Fork Adobe Creek (originating on Page Mill Road near "Shotgun Bend" at an elevation over 1500 feet) joins Adobe Creek by the Duveneck's main house at Hidden Villa. The North Fork Adobe Creek is also known locally as Bunny Creek. The upper watershed of Adobe Creek is completely protected by Hidden Villa and the Mid-Peninsula Regional Open Space District.

Below the confluences of the "three forks", Adobe Creek is joined by three seasonal creeks in Los Altos Hills. The first is 1.3-mile-long (2.1 km) Moody Creek (known locally as Silver Creek) and named for George Washington Moody (1824–1909), a farmer who lived along the stream. His home was located on Moody Creek (which flows down along Central Drive and then Moody Court to its confluence with Adobe Creek). Moody built Moody Road in 1867. The next Adobe Creek tributary is 2.0-mile-long (3.2 km) Purisima Creek (historically known as Purissima Creek and originating between Altamont Road and Dezahara Way and joining Adobe Creek at Deepwater Lane and Bay Tree Lane) and Robleda Creek (along Robleda Road) in Los Altos Hills. Thence, Adobe Creek departs mountainous and hilly terrain and enters the valley floor to descend through Los Altos, Mountain View, and Palo Alto. The creek's course runs 11 miles (18 km).

From 2003 to 2009, Upper Reach 5 of Adobe Creek (between Foothill Expressway and West Edith Avenue) was restored in an innovative partnership called the Adobe Creek Watershed Group with representatives from the Santa Clara Valley Water District, local residents and representatives of the City of Los Altos and the Town of Los Altos Hills. The $7.2 million project improved flood conveyance capacity in Reach 5, and also enhanced the creek ecosystem by removing the existing concrete banks and bottom, repairing and stabilizing the eroded banks using minimal hardscape, removing many non-native trees, and establishing a riparian area along 700 feet (210 m) of bank using mostly shrubs and trees native to the Adobe Creek watershed, as well as non-native California redwoods.

Further downstream, the Palo Alto/Los Altos bike path traverses the creek, running along the Hetch Hetchy Aqueduct right of way.

Several sections of Adobe Creek have been re-aligned, including the trapezoidal concrete drainage channel between El Camino Real and U.S. Highway 101 (the portion between Alma Street and El Camino Real was constructed by the SCVWD in 1959). Also, in 1956, Pink Horse Ranch developer Wendell Roscoe, re-directed Adobe Creek into a new straight line channel next to Moody Road that he dug to redirect the water along the edge of his subdivision "in order to prevent a repeat of two 100-year floods which left the 40 acre Pink Horse Ranch under 2 feet of water". Roscoe installed a flood gate at 12243 Tepa Way which can redirect the flows into the old Adobe Creek channel. In 1975, an 8-foot pipe bypass intended to prevent flooding of properties along Adobe Creek was constructed starting near the intersection of Moody and El Monte Roads (on the Foothill College Campus) going upstream approximately 2,200 feet, ending just upstream of Tepa Way. The original creek channel is now a secondary water "bypass channel" that bears high winter water flows from Adobe Creek and meanders through several properties in the Adobe Lane subdivision before passing under Moody Road and returning to the mainstem at the southeast corner of Foothill College.

Before passing under Highway 101, Adobe Creek is joined by Barron Creek just upstream of Highway 101. Barron Creek was alternatively known as Dry Creek, and appears as a tributary of Adobe Creek in the 1862 Allardt Map, although in the 1899 Topo Map it was tributary to Matadero Creek, and was much later diverted back to Adobe Creek. Barron Creek is 5.8 miles (9.3 km) long, originating in the Los Altos Hills foothills at elevation 360 feet (110 m) along La Paloma Road (just north of Alta Tierra Road), then flowing north along La Paloma Road, then it is joined by a Concepcion Road fork at Fremont Road and proceeds along Fremont Road behind Pinewood School, before turning northeasterly along Arastradero Road where it is joined by another minor fork originating in Esther Clark Park. After crossing Foothill Expressway it is buried in an underground pipe just west of Gunn High School but sees daylight where the creek crosses Bol Park Bike Path in a small, man-made flood control basin, then at Laguna Avenue again enters an underground pipe running beneath Los Robles Avenue to El Camino Real. Barron Creek has been greatly modified for flood control purposes; the creek bed downstream from El Camino Real is a concrete trapezoidal channel.

After passing under Highway 101, Adobe Creek enters the Palo Alto Flood Basin just west of a levee at the end of San Antonio Road. This levee separates Charleston Slough on the east from Mayfield Slough on the west and is also the eastern border of the Palo Alto Baylands. The Flood Basin is maintained a couple feet below sea level in order to absorb floodwaters from Adobe Creek and Matadero Creek. By lowering the basin, what was once tidal saltwater marsh is now predominantly freshwater marsh. Adobe Creek is joined by Matadero Creek at the north end of Mayfield Slough, where it historically joined with San Francisquito Creek before the latter was diverted north. Mayfield Slough has a tidal gate through which fresh water passes to San Francisco Bay, and some salt water is permitted to return to Mayfield Slough when the tides are higher.

In the 1800s the Baylands marshes ended between Alma and El Camino Real in Palo Alto, which explains why historical maps show area creeks appearing to terminate before they reach the Bay. Duck-hunting blinds were common in the nineteenth century along what is now Middlefield Road. The 1862 Allardt map shows Adobe Creek, then Yeguas Creek, having dual termini – one in the Baylands Marsh and the other to San Francisquito Creek just before entering San Francisco Bay.

== Habitat and wildlife ==
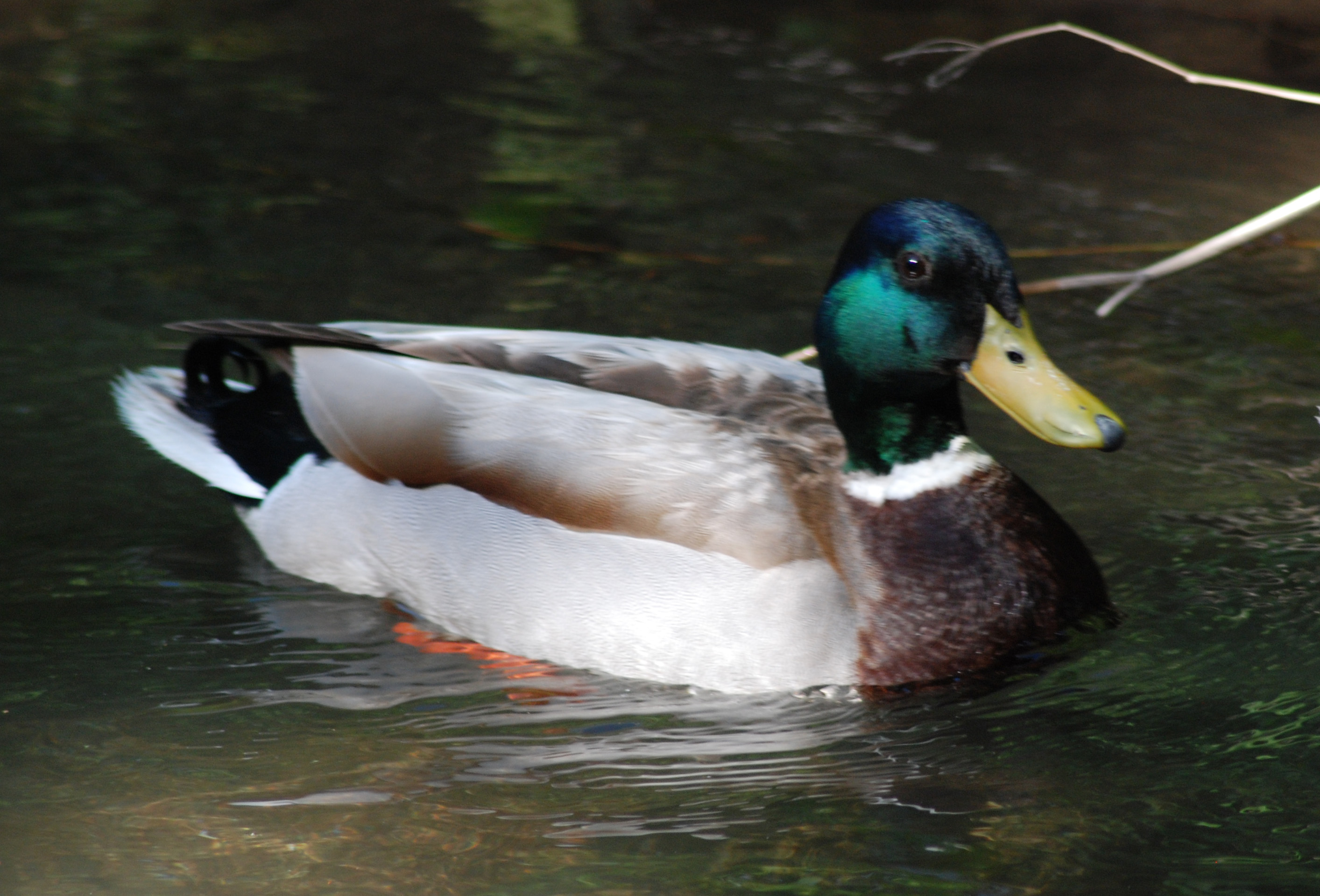
Mallard in May just above Edith Street bridge, the creek now runs dry by summer, but was once a year-round trout stream

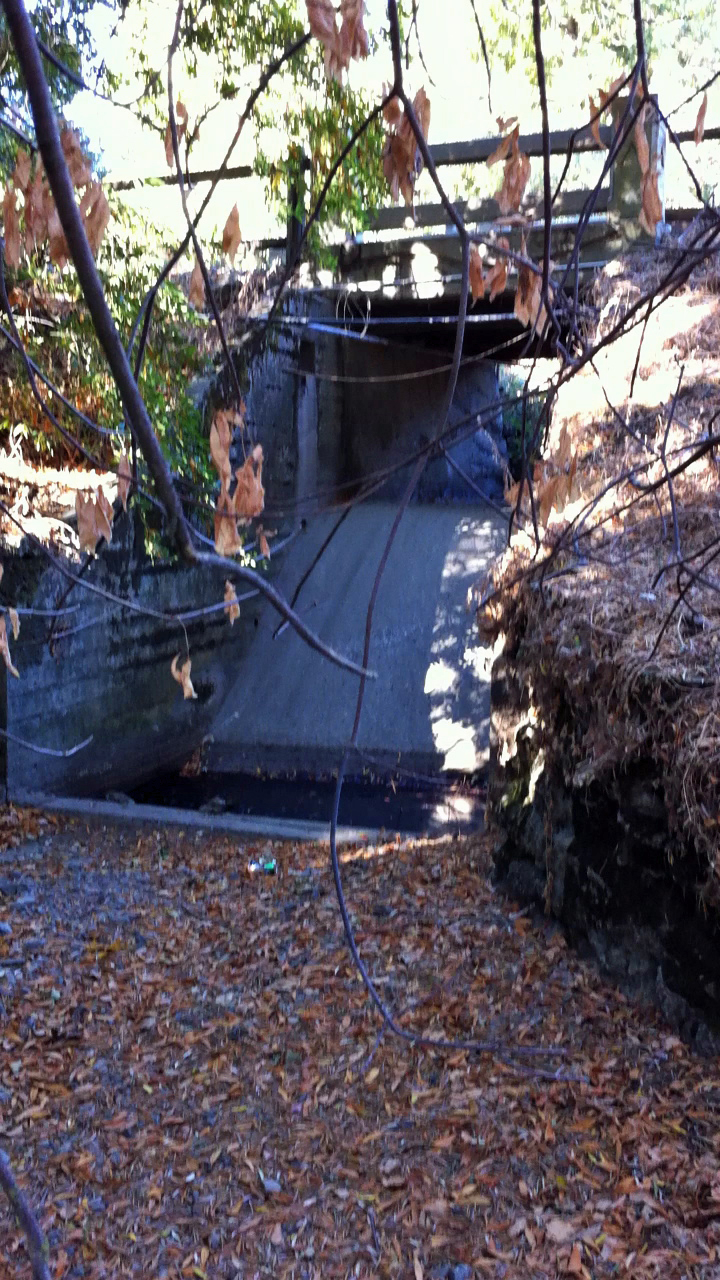
This drop under the Hidden Villa bridge is one of several barriers to steelhead trout spawning runs on Adobe Creek 2010

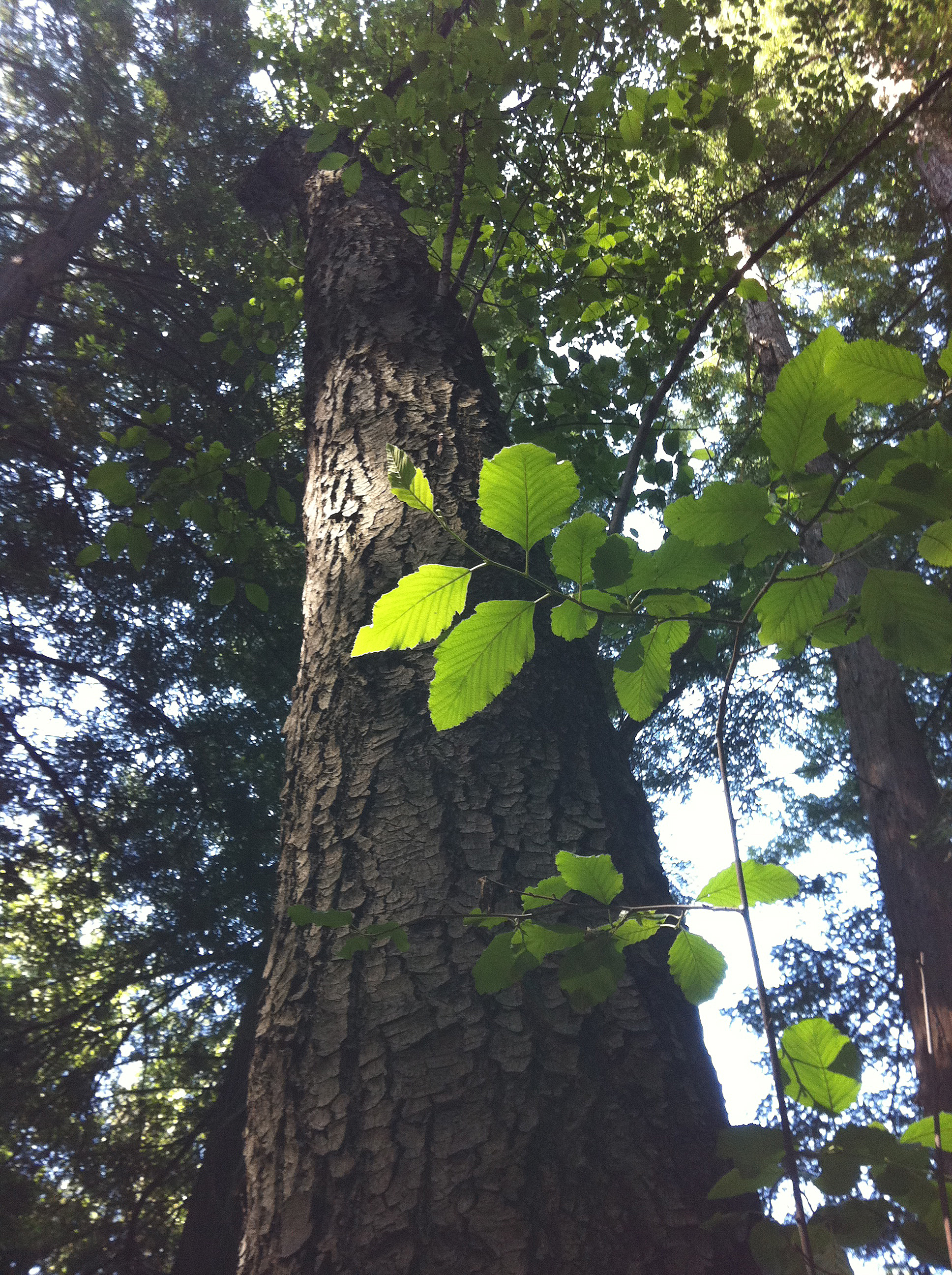
White alder (Alnus rhombifolia) in Redwood Grove. Alder is California's most valuable hardwood, often used for furniture, flooring, or cabinetry.

The creek flows through Redwood Grove, a 5.9-acre (24,000 m^{2}) nature preserve off University Avenue in Los Altos purchased by the city in 1974. In October, 2009 Los Altos contracted with Acterra to remove non-native plants and revitalize the redwood, oak woodland, riparian and grassland ecosystems by installing native plants, improving soil conditions, and creating habitat for wildlife such as bird houses and native bee boxes. The coast redwoods (Sequoia sempervirens) were transplanted by the Halsey family from a location on Summit Road in the Santa Cruz Mountains and replaced the native willows. At Manresa Bridge at the east edge of Redwood Grove one can see the native red willow (Salix laevigata) and arroyo willow (Salix lasiolepis) trees. The historic Halsey House, built in the late 1920s by Theodore and Emma Halsey, is a good example of Spanish Revival architecture. The city designated Halsey House a local landmark in 1981 and until recently it housed the Florence Fava collection of Coastanoan or Ohlone Indian artifacts from a creekside archeological excavation in Los Altos Hills (now moved to the Los Altos History House). On June 16, 2010, the Los Altos City Council finalized the purchase of 10,000 square feet (930 m^{2}) of creekside property from Delbert and Marlene Beumer, who wanted to provide a safe pathway connecting Shoup Park and Redwood Grove.

Riparian vegetation was described in the 1989 Adobe Creek Restoration Plan. Existing native riparian trees include willows (Salix species), California sycamore (Platanus racemosa) in Redwood Grove and near the ranch manager's house at Hidden Villa, white alder (Alnus rhombifolia) (one large specimen in Redwood Grove – see photo), cottonwood (Populus) at the top of the Moody Creek tributary, bigleaf maple (Acer macrophyllum), California buckeye (Aesculus californica), California bay laurel (Umbellularia californica) and California walnut (Juglans californica).

Steelhead trout (Oncorhynchus mykiss) occurred historically in Adobe Creek. The earliest report touted the trout in the Sportsman's Gazetteer in 1877. This very early report makes rumors that Adobe Creek's trout were introduced extremely unlikely since the first trout hatcheries in California did not propagate any trout until the 1870s, and much of their production was shipped to hatcheries out of state. A physical specimen was collected in 1893 by Wilbur Wilson Thoburn, Stanford University Professor of Bionomics, and is preserved in the California Academy of Sciences collection. In 1898 John Otterbein Snyder, ichthyologist and Stanford Professor of Zoology, also collected steelhead trout specimens in San Antonio Creek (now Adobe Creek). A 1909 land office brochure promoted Los Altos for its "never-failing mountain trout stream, trout caught a few feet from kitchen doors". The reaches upstream from Hidden Villa have been judged excellent trout spawning habitat. Josephine Duveneck wrote, "Before the era of concrete, fish used to swim up to spawn and native trout lured many a small boy to seek out the deeper pools carrying his home-made fishing pole and can of worms." Local historian Florence Fava also reported that "the creeks which lace the (Hidden Villa) property and join Adobe Creek were originally full of fish". According to old-timer accounts, locations below Hidden Villa that held spawning steelhead included the large cement pieces downstream from the Foothill Junior College paint shop outflow and cut banks below Interstate 280, in the perennial reaches of Adobe Creek stretching downstream to just above Redwood Grove. A 27-inch steelhead trout (see main photo) caught by boys in June, 1956 about two blocks from Van Buren Avenue (now Van Buren Street) is the last historical record of this salmonid ascending Adobe Creek to spawn upstream of El Camino Real. Steelhead spawning runs were partially blocked by construction of the tidal gate in the Palo Alto Flood Basin at the mouth of Adobe Creek in 1957. This barrier was only partial, as according to the California Department of Fish and Game (CDFG), steelhead were caught by local fishermen during 1985, 1986 and 1987 in Mayfield Slough at the confluence of Matadero and Adobe Creeks; and at least six steelhead were noted passing the tidal gates at Mayfield Slough in the Palo Alto Flood Basin in April 1987. In 1959, steelhead trout spawning runs were completely blocked by another flood control project on Adobe Creek, when the Santa Clara Valley Water District transformed the natural stream channel into a concrete trapezoidal chute with eight foot drop and dysfunctional fish ladder below El Camino Real. The 2.4 miles (3.9 km) long concrete trapezoidal channel structure from El Camino Real northward to Highway 101 stops fish with thin sheets of rapid horizontal flow during winter. Today there are additional upstream barriers to fish passage, including drop structures below the culverts under Interstate 280 and Foothill Expressway. Additional barriers occur at the O'Keefe Lane and Hidden Villa bridges, and the creek suffers from significant bank erosion, failing channel stabilization structures, and sedimentation. Finally, the trash rack at the tidal gate at the mouth of Mayfield Slough in the Palo Alto Flood Basin continues as an intermittent complete barrier to fish passage when it is closed.

Four species of native fishes have been collected from Adobe Creek in 2011: California roach (Lavinia symmetricus), Sacramento sucker (Catostomus occidentalis occidentalis), three-spined stickleback (Gasterosteus aculeatus), and prickly sculpin (Cottus asper). Leidy reported the fish still inhabiting the Adobe Creek's lowest reach in 2007 – native California roach, Sacramento sucker, three-spined stickleback, and non-native common carp (Cyprinus carpio), rainwater killifish (Lucania parva), and western mosquitofish (Gambusia affinis). A 2011 fish survey utilizing electrofishing showed only native fish above El Camino Real: the reach above Redwood Grove and the Manresa Lane bridge in Los Altos included California roach, Sacramento sucker and three-spined stickleback – an assemblage that generally includes steelhead trout in other Bay Area streams. Further upstream, the diversity of the fish assemblage steadily diminishes due to passage barriers and reduced stream flows from diversions and wells: at Moody Road just above Foothill College, only California roach and three-spined stickleback were collected, at Rhus Ridge bridge in Los Altos Hills only three-spined stickleback were collected, and at the Francemont Avenue bridge and along the Adobe Creek Trail at Hidden Villa no fish were found.

== Palo Alto Flood Basin ==
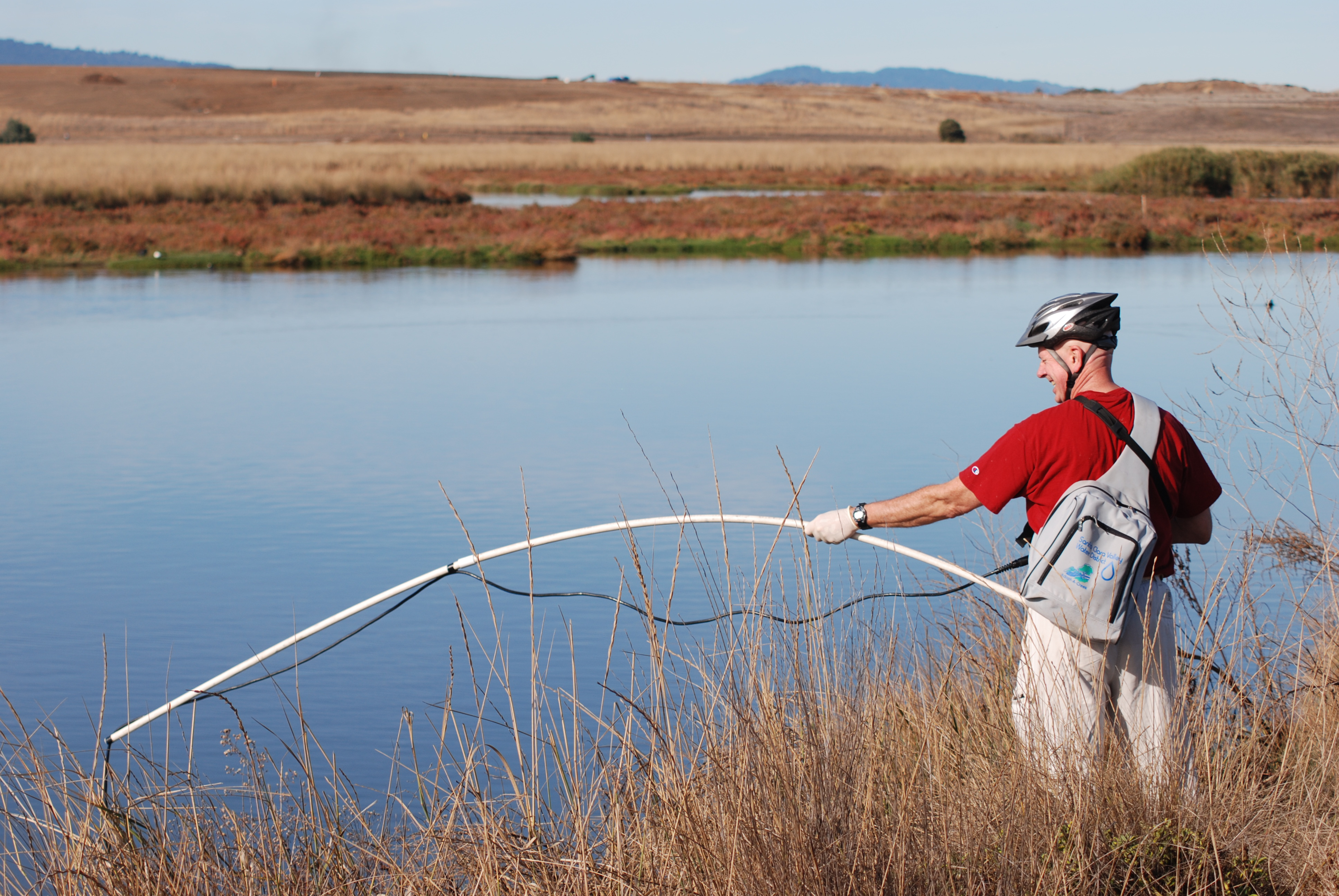
Jim McCarthy, Adobe Creek streamkeeper, was honored by the Santa Clara County Creeks Coalition for his work to restore the creek. Here he measures temperature, dissolved oxygen, salinity, copper levels, and turbidity 2010.

The Palo Alto Flood Basin was constructed in 1956 in order to prevent a repeat of the floods of 1955, when a high tide prevented the escape of heavy runoff from Matadero, Adobe, and Barron Creeks into the San Francisco Bay. The trapped runoff waters overflowed upstream creek banks and caused severe flooding in Palo Alto. In order to control the flow of water into the flood basin, a tidegate was placed at the confluence of Adobe Creek, Matadero Creek, and the San Francisco Bay, so that the flood basin could be maintained at approximately 2 feet below sea level, creating room to absorb floodwaters. The tidegate consists of several weirs and one operator-controlled sluice gate that enables tidal flows into the basin in order to improve water quality and for mosquito control. Three agencies oversee the tidegates: Santa Clara Valley Water District, City of Palo Alto, and Santa Clara County Vector Control. Because the trash grate and weirs separate the mouth of the flood basin from the San Francisco Bay estuary, large fish cannot swim freely between the Bay and the basin, unless the sluice gate is open. In addition, the tidegates are set to reduce tidal inflows into the basin, so that the basin is mostly freshwater. After a rainstorm the tidegate is kept closed, however this is precisely when steelhead trout in-migrations should occur. In 2002 a small opening was cut in the trash grate on the tidal gate to permit fish passage but local fisherman in the Flood Basin no longer report catching steelhead trout in recent years.

From November 16 to 20, 2002, approximately 100 striped bass (Morone saxatilis), 5 bat rays (Myliobatis californica) and 2 leopard sharks (Triakis semifasciata) were found dead in the Flood Control Basin in both Adobe and Matadero Creeks within one mile of the tidegate. The fishkill was attributed to the first large rainstorm washing a large amount of leaf litter into the basin, leading to eutrophication and low dissolved oxygen. This is supported by the fact that the dead fish were all large (requiring more oxygen) at 2 to 4 feet long and the mouths and gills of the bass were fully extended open.

== Trails and recreation ==
=== Loop trail ===
The San Francisco Bay Trail, which passes in a loop around both sides of the Palo Alto Flood Basin is known as the Adobe Creek Loop Trail and is easily accessed from a parking lot at the northern terminus of San Antonio Road, just north of U.S. Highway 101. A scenic, easy walking or mountain biking trail, it also provides outstanding birdwatching and in winter is known for its flock of American white pelicans (Pelecanus erythrorhynchos). The Adobe Creek Loop Trail begins by heading north along the levee between Adobe Creek and the Charleston Slough out to the confluence of Adobe Creek and Matadero Creek. As one heads north on the levee, Charleston Slough is on the right and Adobe Creek is on the left. The Charleston Slough is a rich salt marsh and littoral zone, providing feeding areas for a variety of shorebirds and other estuarine wildlife. At low tide Charleston Slough looks like a salt pond, like the Cargill salt ponds to the east of it, but it is open to tidal flow. Pumps and gates regulate the flow through the slough. Water from the slough gets pumped into Shoreline Lake, which then drains into Permanente Creek. The slough was named after George Charleston, who came from Scotland in 1852 and purchased 160 acres (0.65 km^{2}) of marshland in this area. Charleston Road and Charleston Court also bear his name. Continuing north, the wide, curving Loop Trail eventually touches San Francisco Bay itself and curves to the west, crossing over the tidal gate of Mayfield Slough and enters the Palo Alto Baylands Nature Preserve. The sailing station boat launching dock is visible on the opposite shore of the channel at the mouth of the former Palo Alto Yacht Harbor. Baylands Nature Preserve surrounds what used to be the Palo Alto Yacht Harbor, now a silted-in mud flat and marsh which provides excellent birding. The Adobe Creek Loop Trail then heads back southwest with Matadero Creek on the left and Byxbee Park (former landfill) on the right, eventually connecting to the Bay Trail at East Bayshore Road. Heading east along East Bayshore Road, turn immediately left after crossing over Adobe Creek to return on the Bay Trail to the San Antonio Road parking lot.

=== Other trails ===
Many locals enjoy the natural setting of a short walk through Redwood Grove, of which portions are on an elevated wooden boardwalk. In 1986 the city of Los Altos was granted an open space easement on the south bank of Adobe Creek and developed a trail from the south end of Redwood Grove to the Manresa Lane Bridge.

Hidden Villa is the starting point for the relatively gentle Adobe Creek Trail, an easy 0.8 miles (1.3 km) hike upstream (one-way) along a cool, wooded canyon culminating at a plaque commemorating the founding of the Loma Prieta Chapter of the Sierra Club. Two routes connect Hidden Villa to the Black Mountain Trail at Ewing Hill at 1,200 feet (370 m) of elevation, the Hostel Trail (1.3 miles) or the Adobe Creek Trail (0.8 mile) connecting to the Ewing Trail (0.3 miles). The Black Mountain Trail then continues up a strenuous 3 miles (4.8 km) to the 2,800-foot (850 m) summit of Black Mountain.

Another "Adobe Creek Trail" is found in the Monte Bello Open Space Preserve, which is an easy to moderate 1.4 mile hike that begins on Montebello Road about 0.1 miles east of Page Mill Road and rejoins Montebello Road after traversing the headwaters of the West Fork Adobe Creek as well as a large meadow with views of the South Bay.

=== Watercourse gallery ===
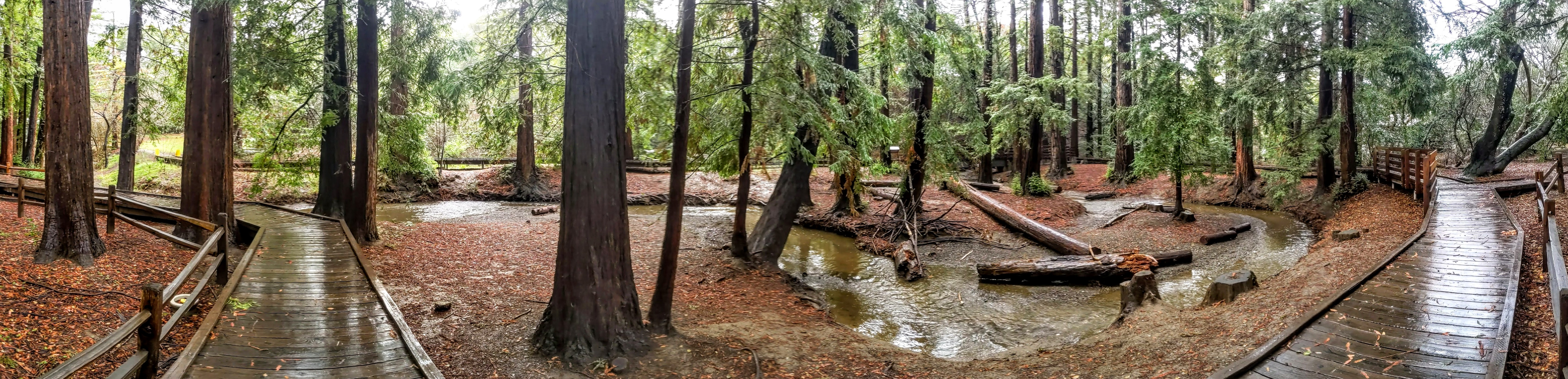
Adobe Creek and boardwalk in the Los Altos Redwood Grove, after a rain
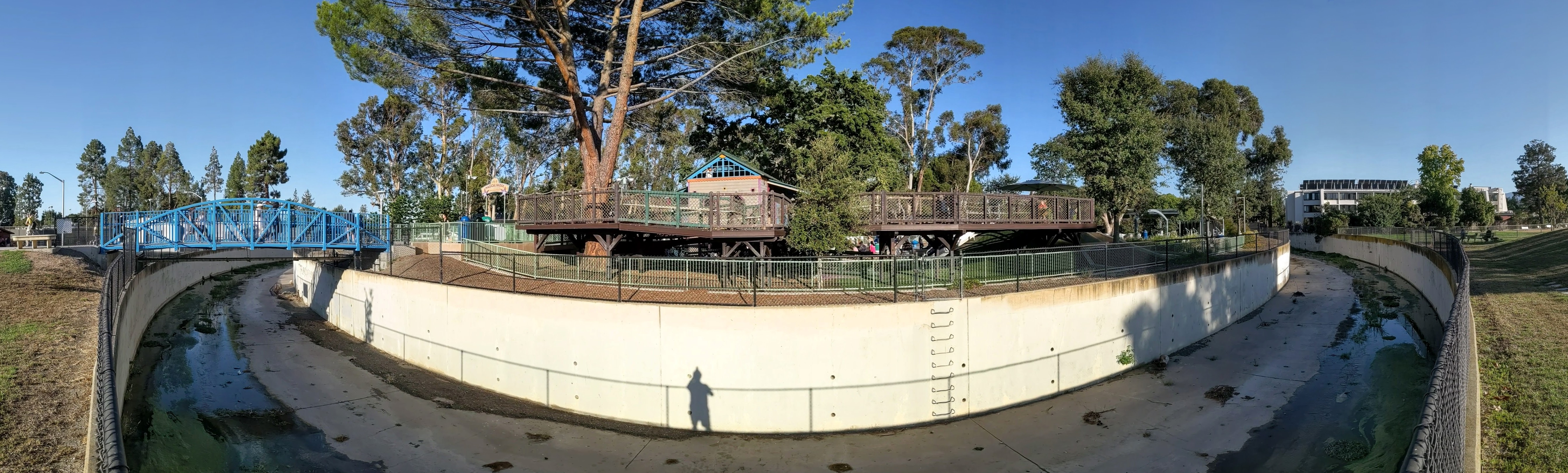
Panoramic view where Adobe Creek makes a turn around the Magic Bridge Playground in Mitchell Park, Palo Alto
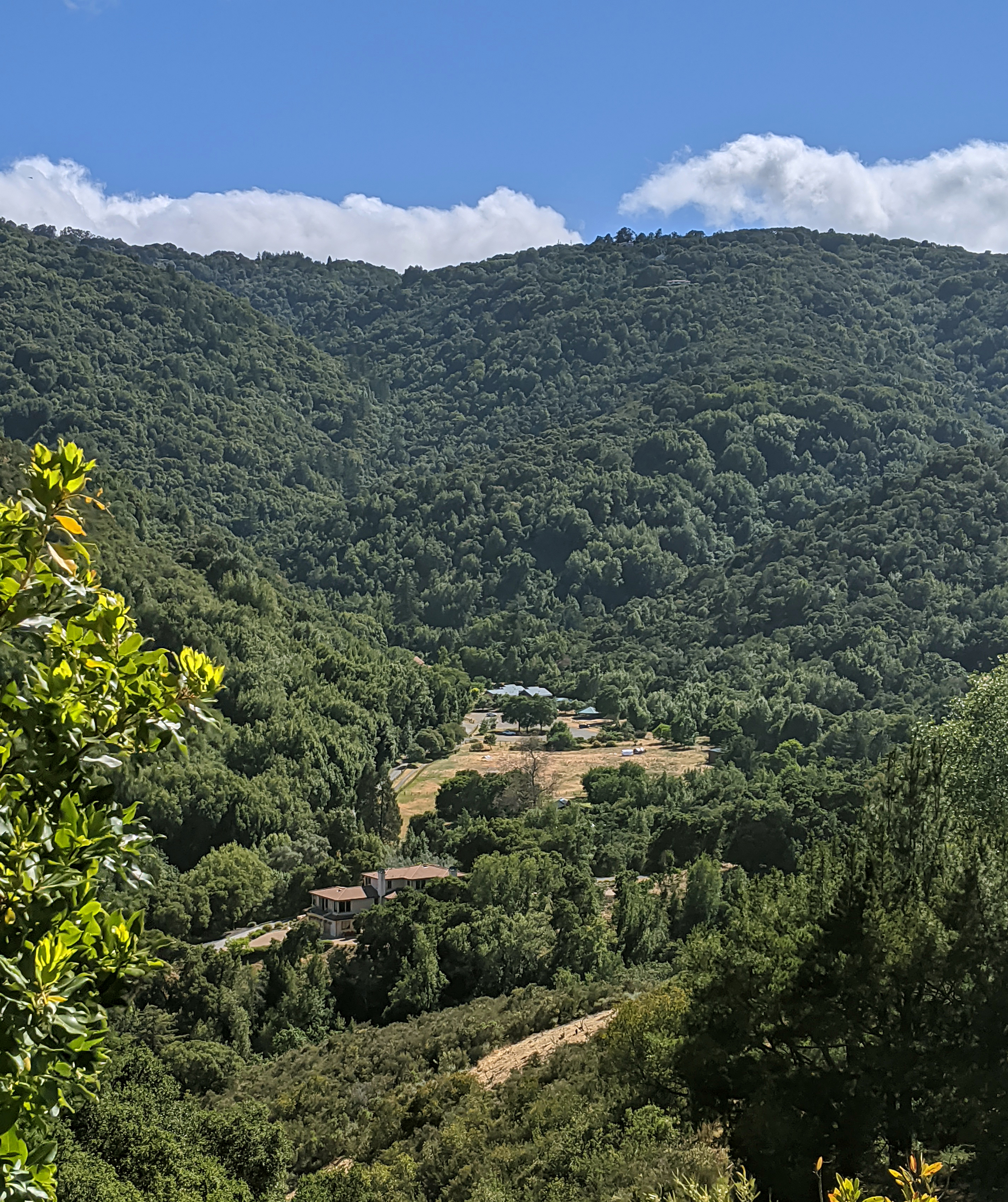
The headwaters above Hidden Villa, viewed from a hill above Moody Road in Los Altos Hills

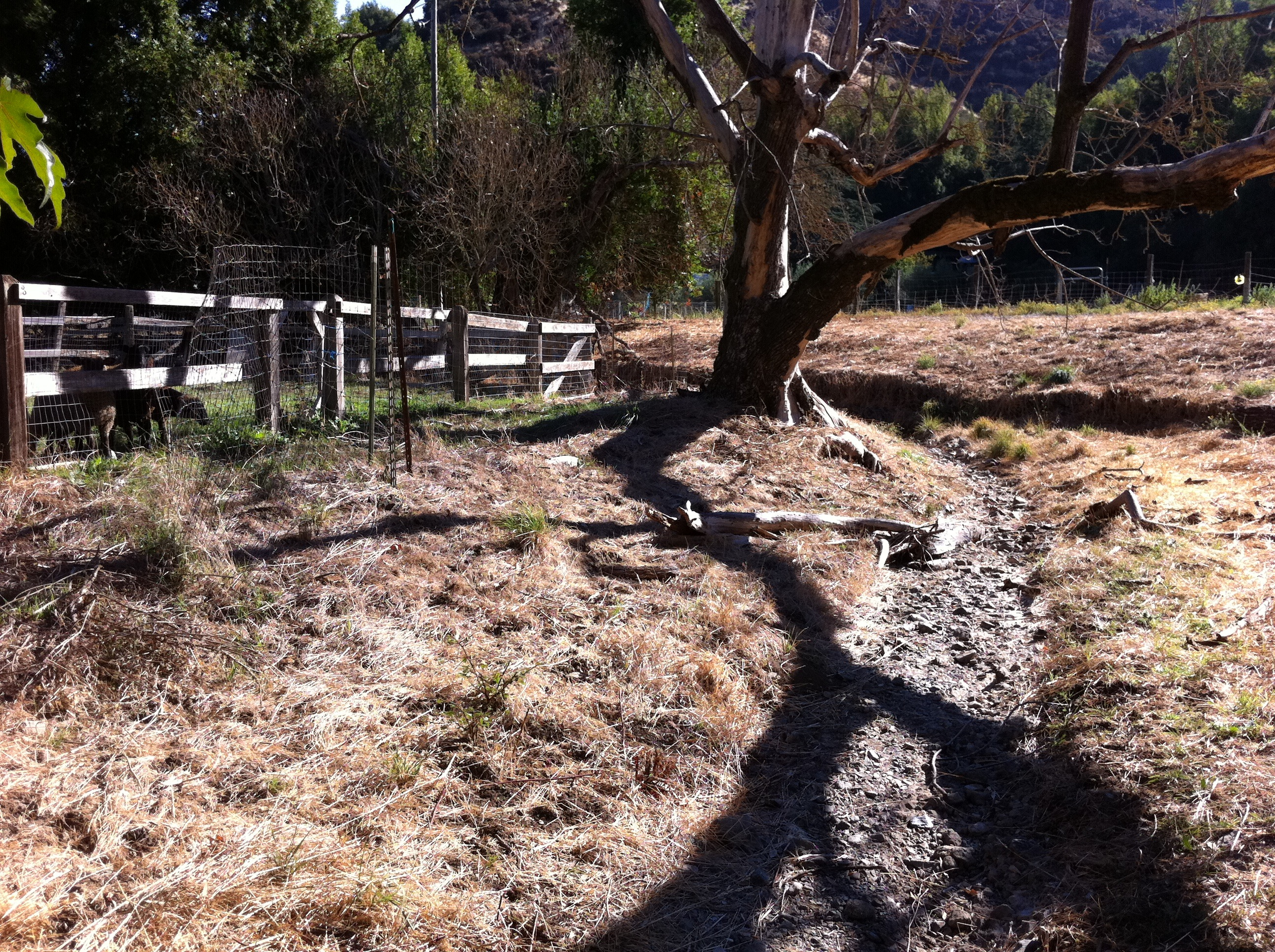
Loss of streamside (riparian) vegetation increases stream velocity, causing downstream erosion and channel incision (dark gully behind tree) at Hidden Villa 2010

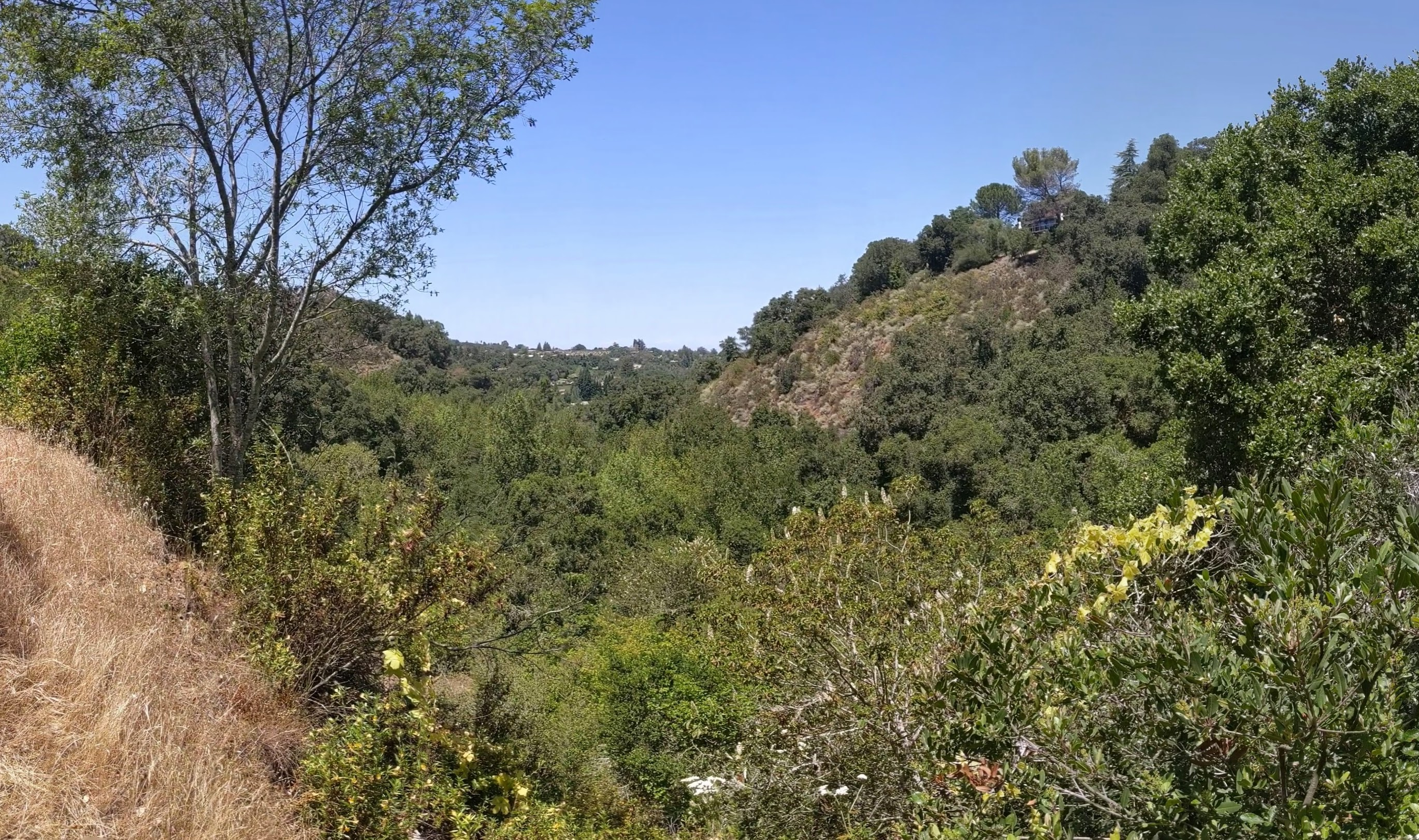
View from Rhus Ridge Trail, of the watershed of a branch, looking toward the main stem

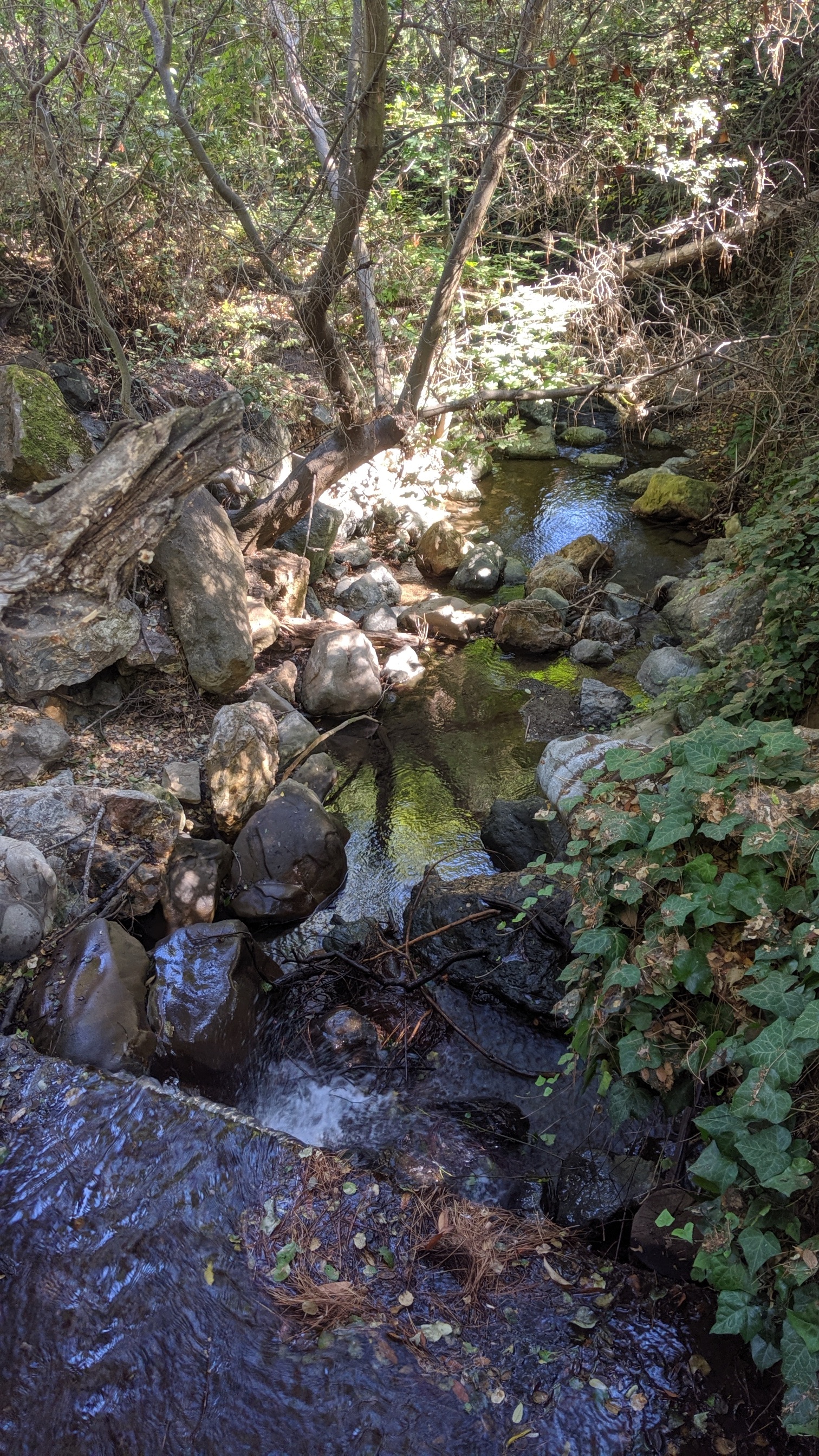
The creek takes a drop after it crosses under O'Keefe Lane, Los Altos.

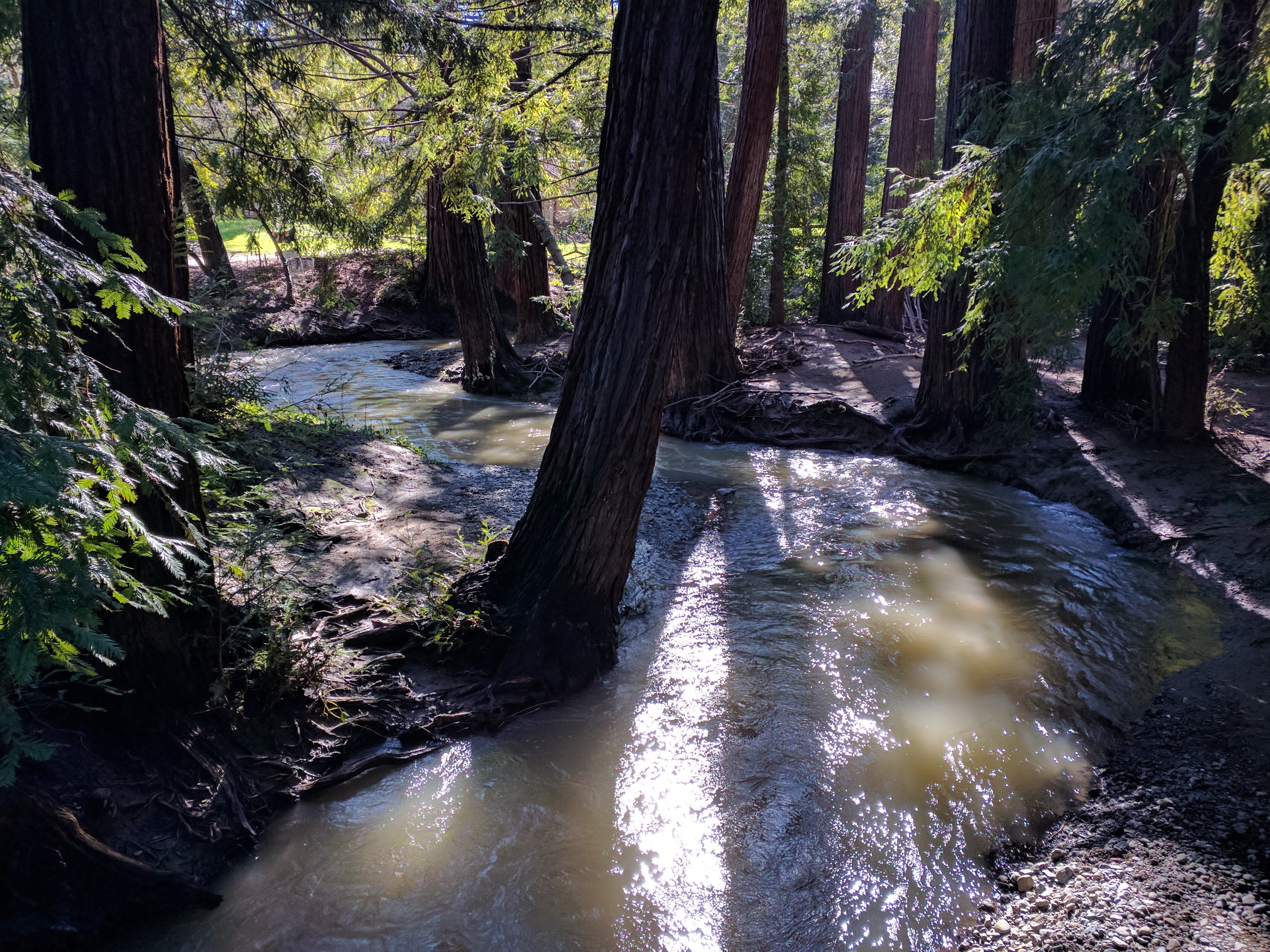
At high flow, a week after January 2017 rains, in Los Altos Redwood Grove

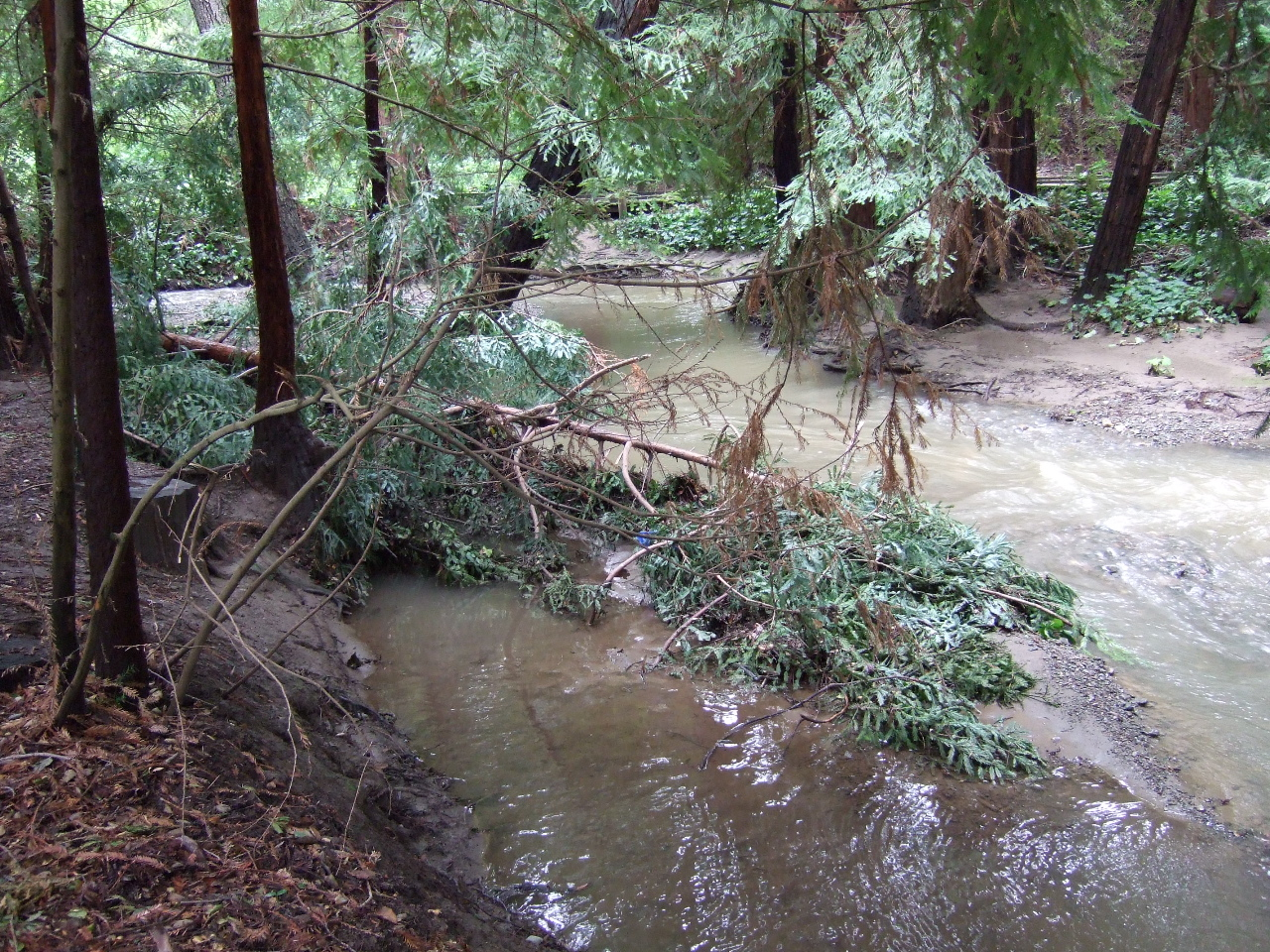
Fallen redwood in Adobe Creek. This large woody debris prevents erosion by slowing high flows and provides shelter for trout and other species

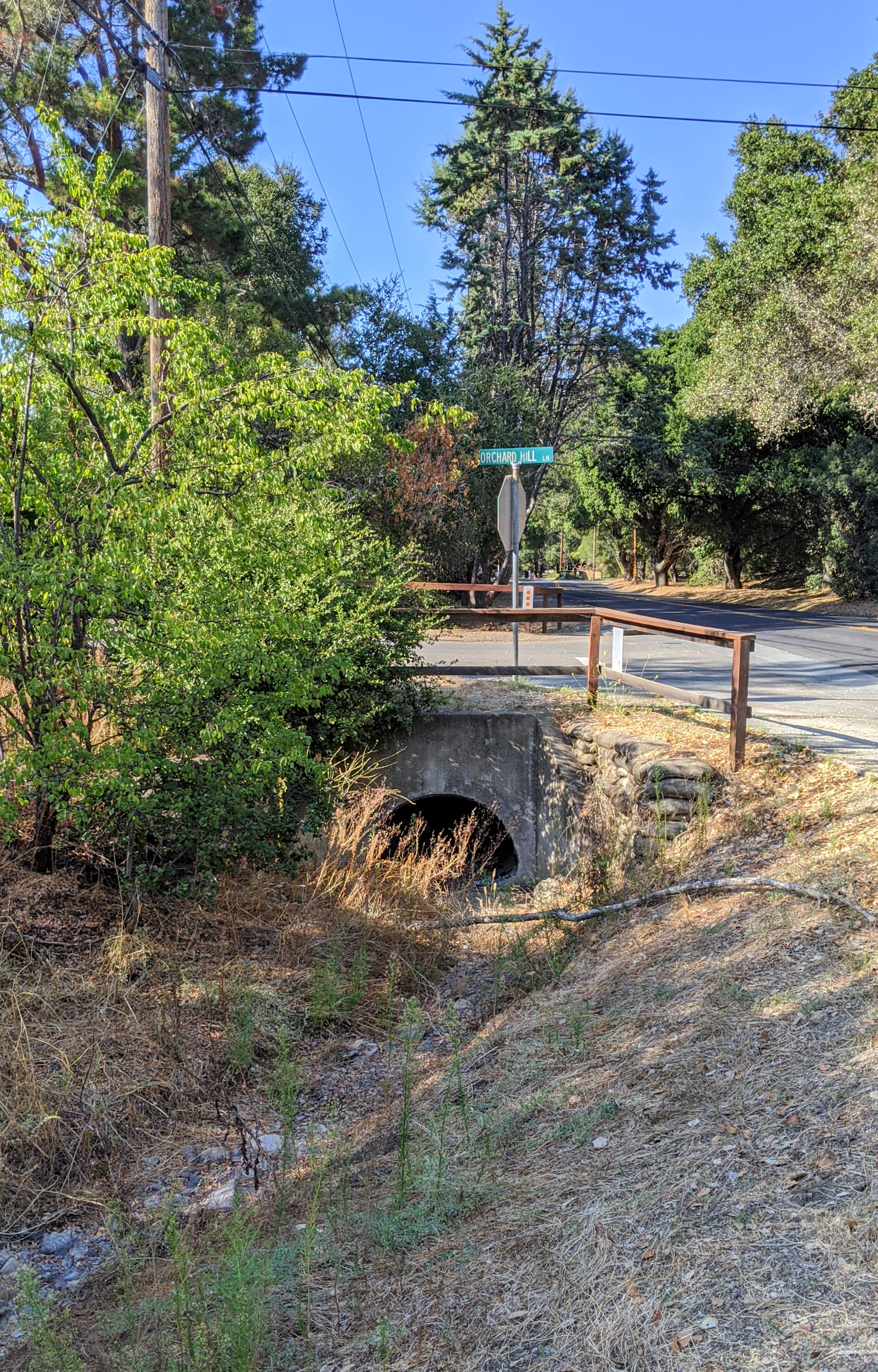
Robleda Creek, a minor tributary, at Orchard Hill Lane, Los Altos Hills

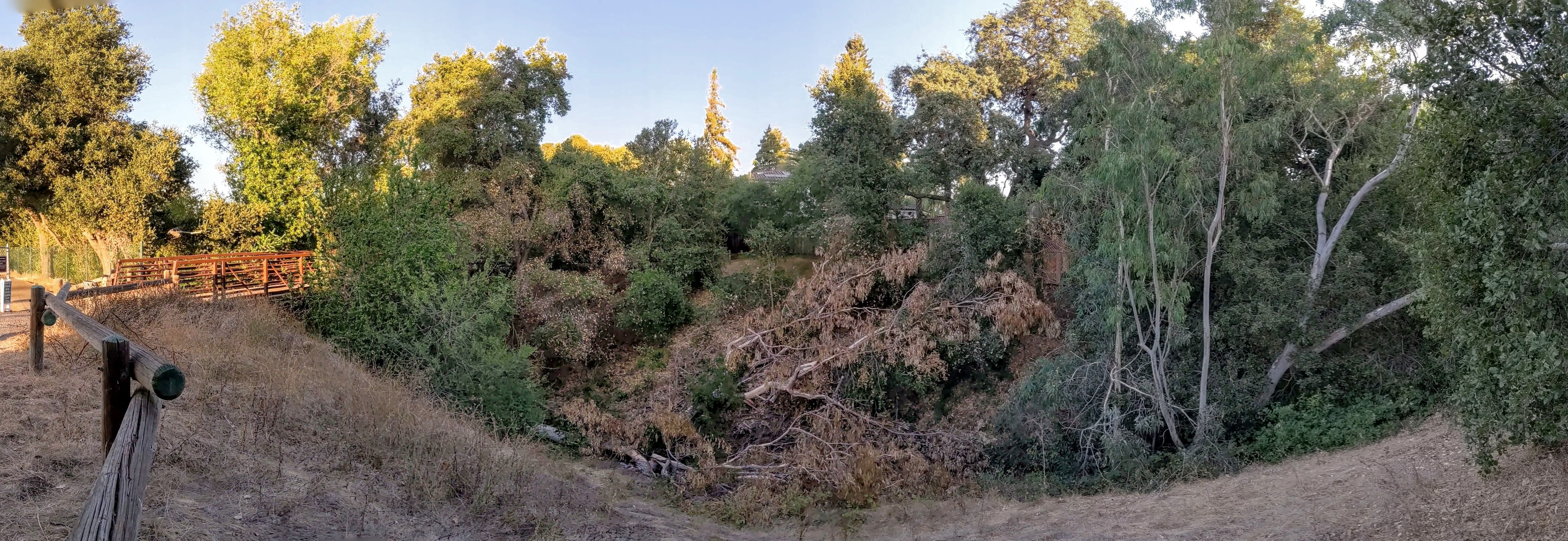
At the Los Altos–Palo Alto bike path along the Hetch Hetchy Aqueduct, with a fallen tree

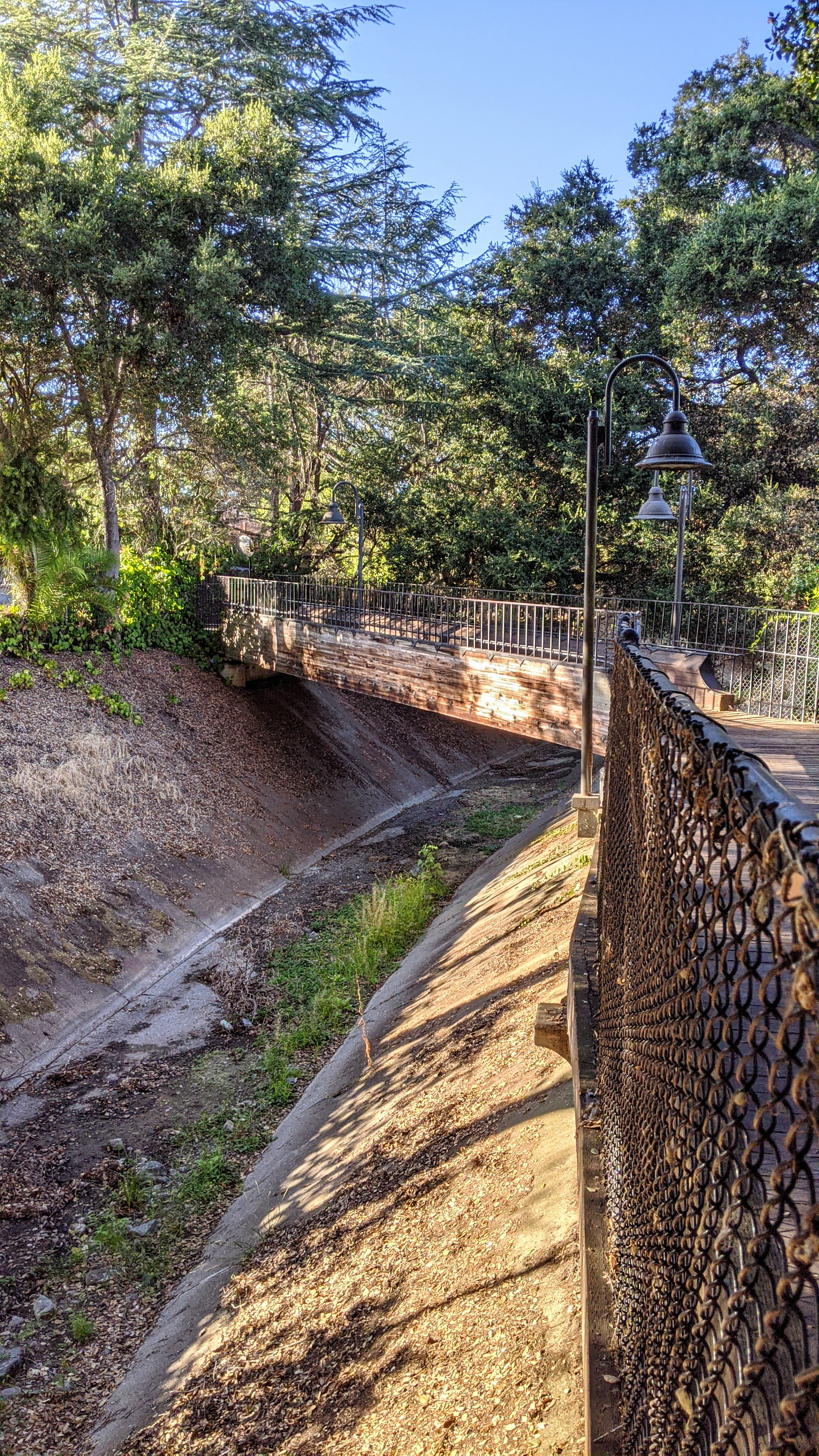
At the Miller Avenue to Wilkie Way, Palo Alto, bicycle/pedestrian path

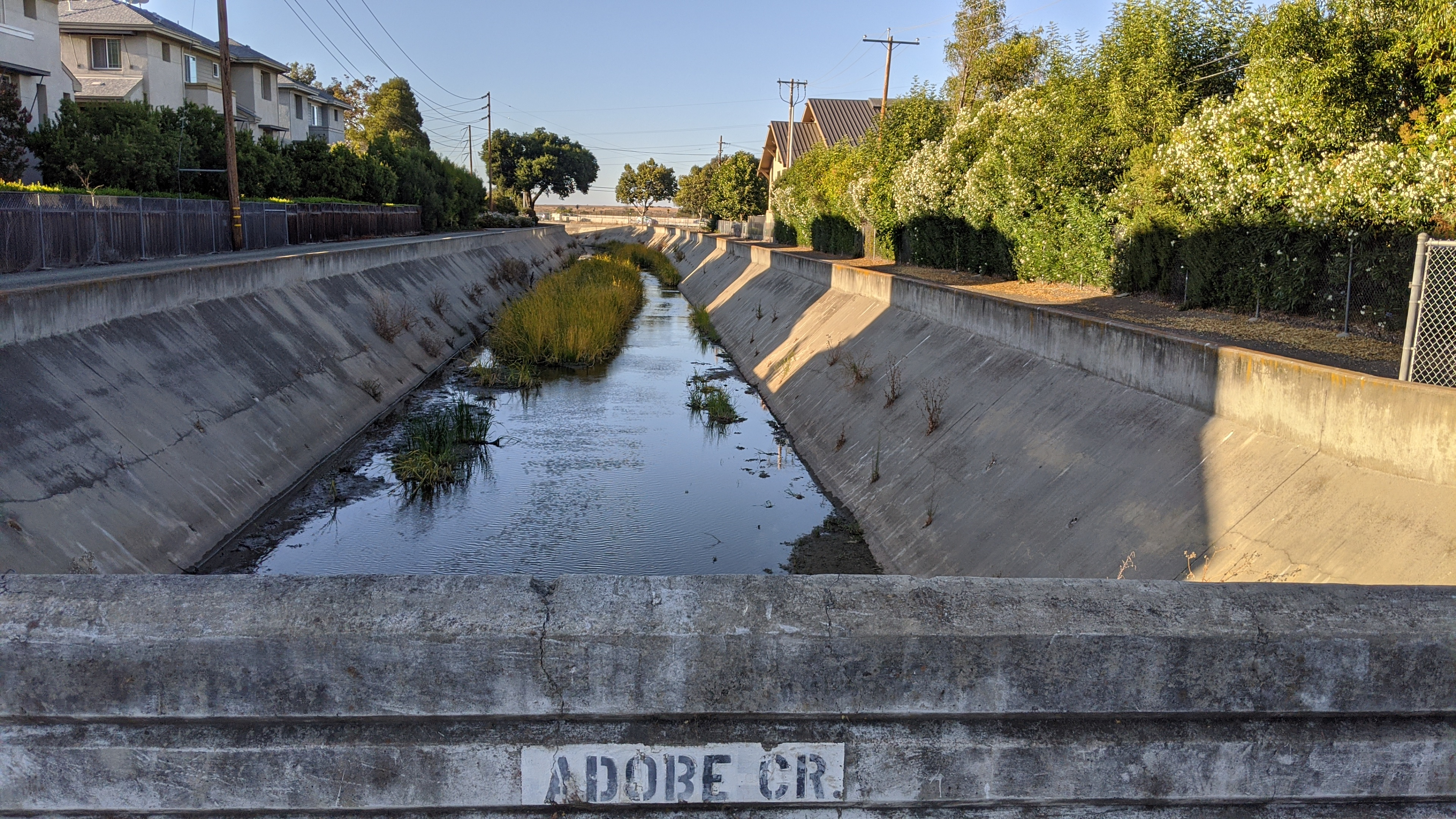
Looking north from East Meadow Drive, Palo Alto, in the dry season

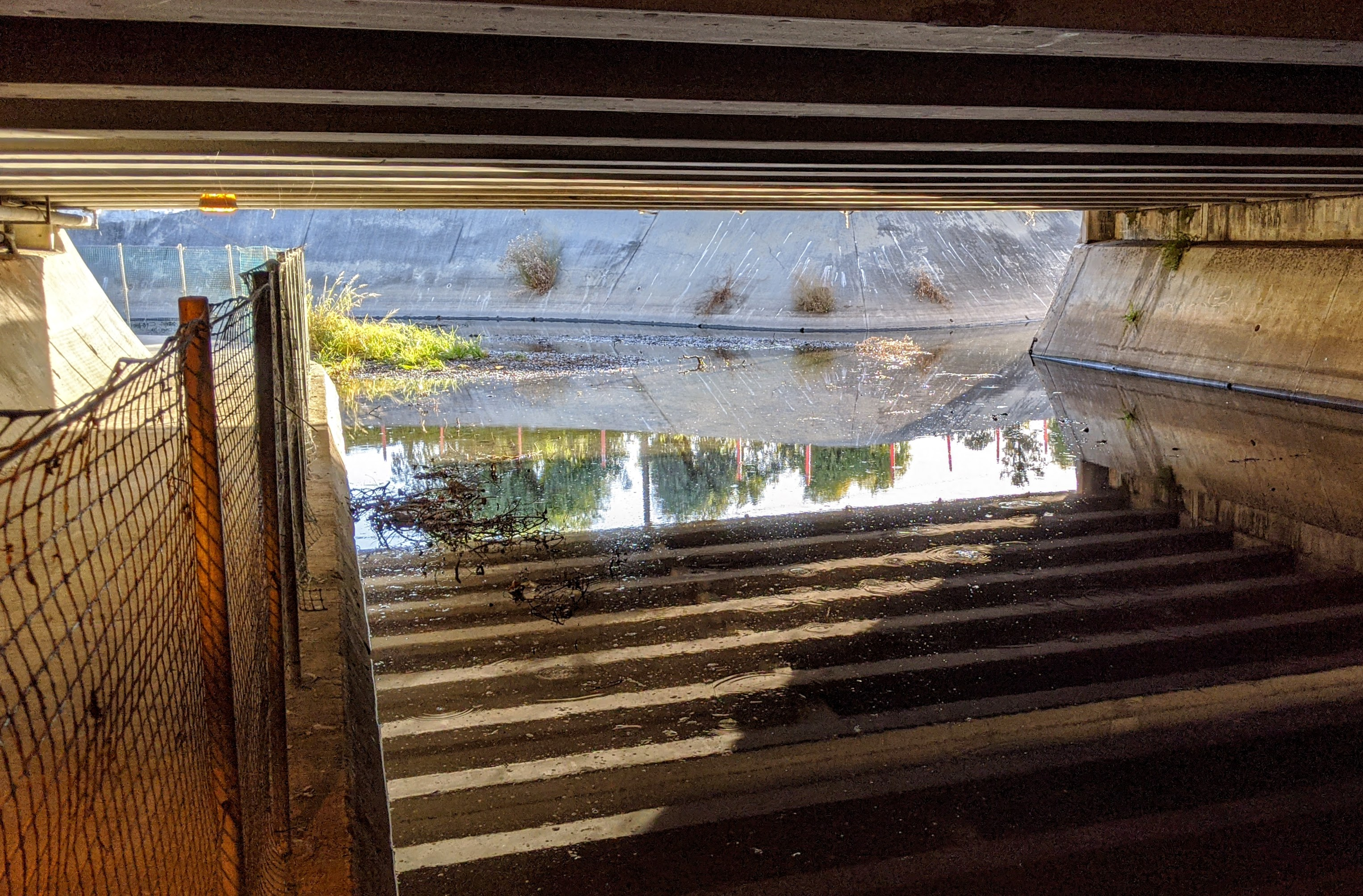
Under US Highway 101; during the dry season the underpass is used as a bicycle/pedestrian trail.

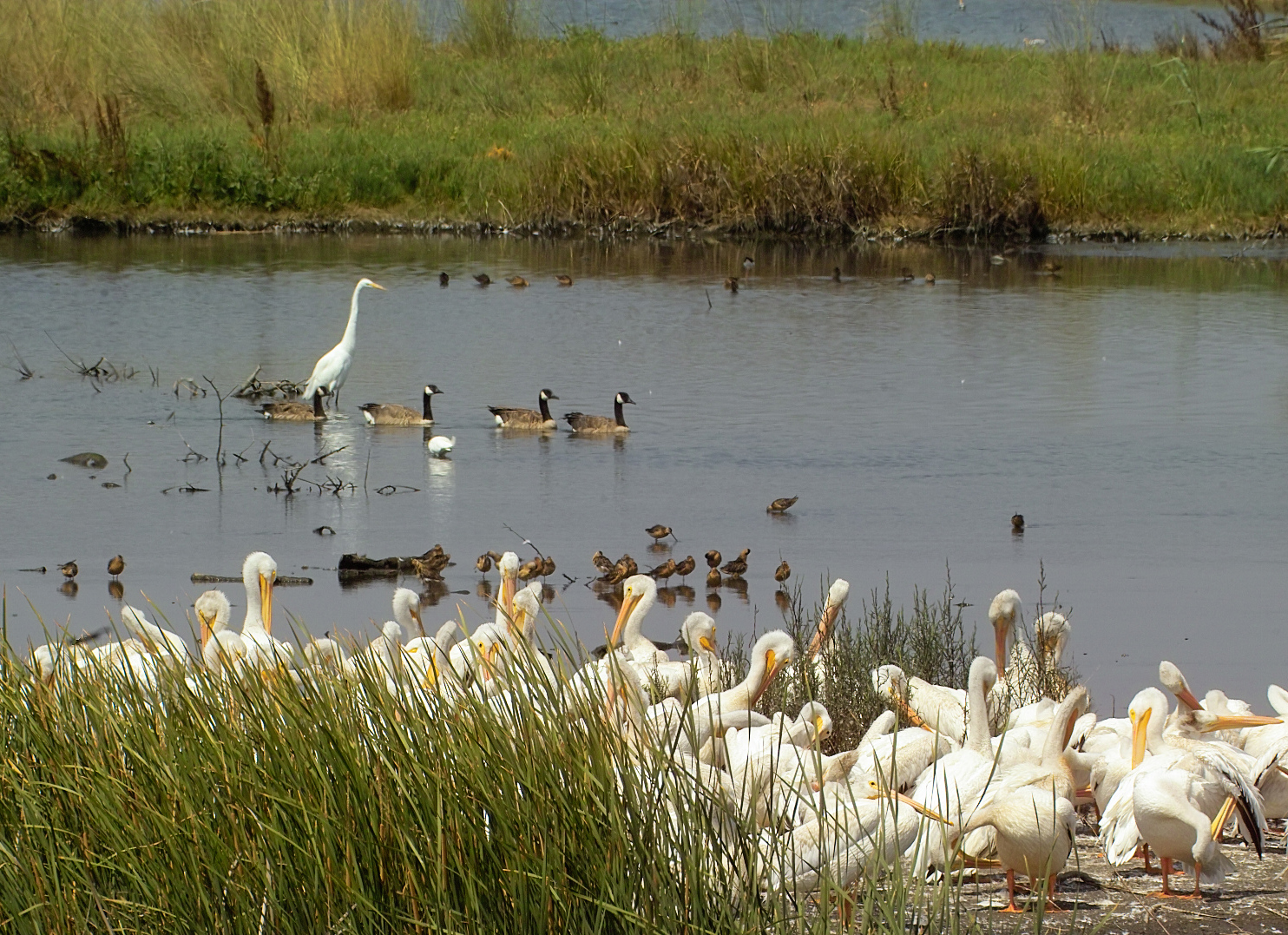
White pelicans, geese, egret, and other birds in Adobe Creek's slough in 2003

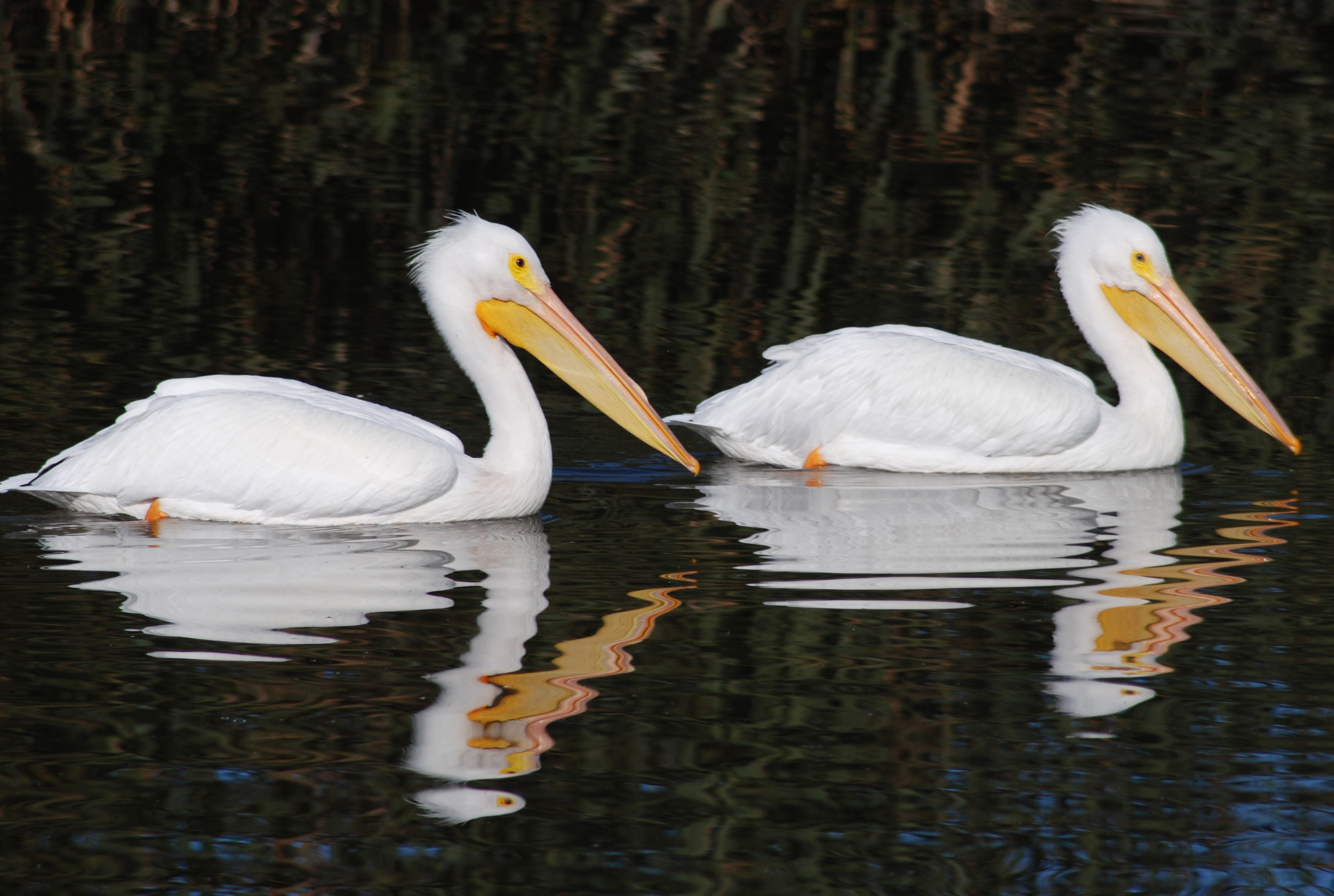
American white pelicans wintering on Adobe Creek in the Palo Alto Flood Basin December 2010

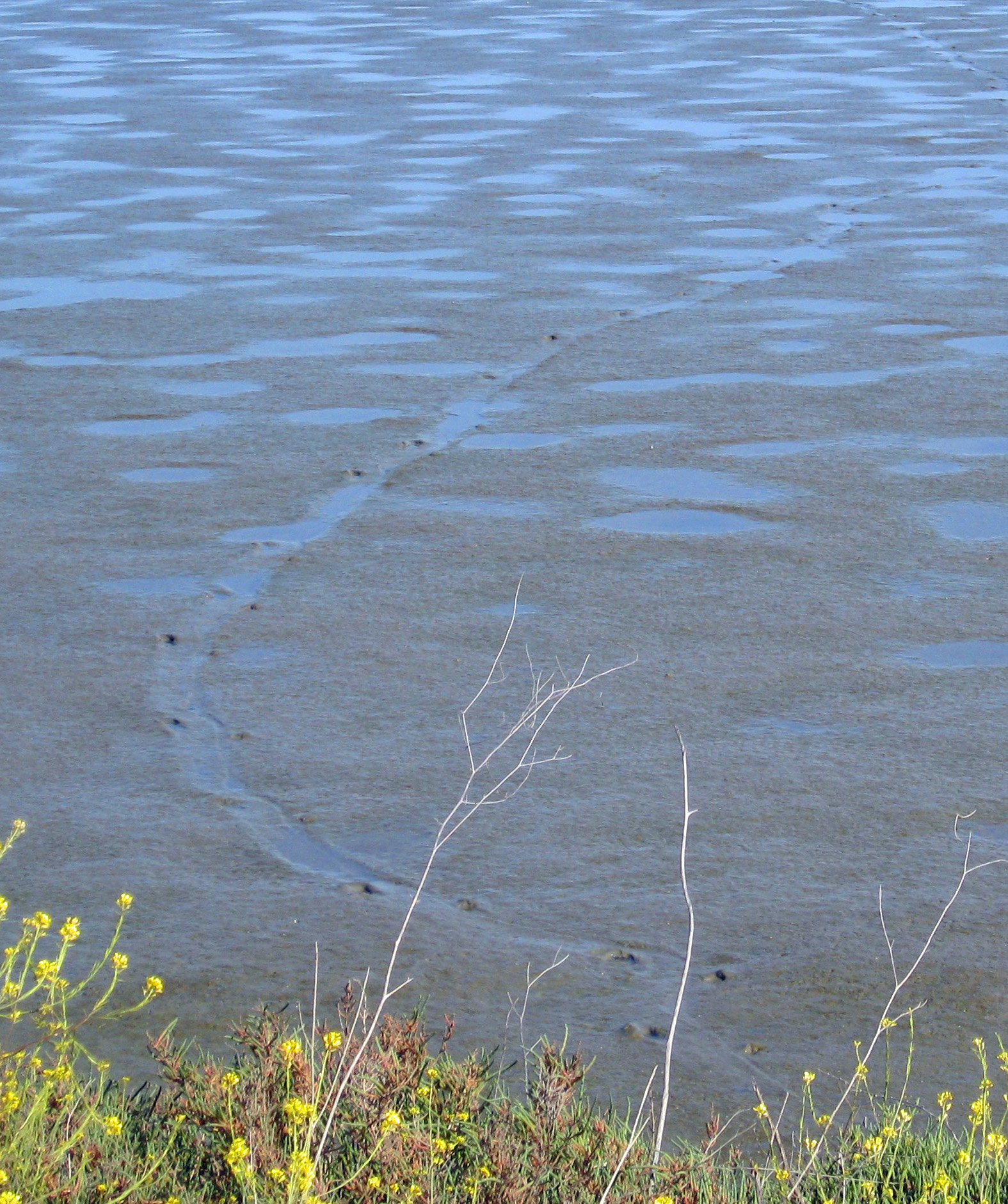
Beaver tracks east of Adobe Creek levee in Charleston Slough April 2008, Courtesy of Richard Stovel
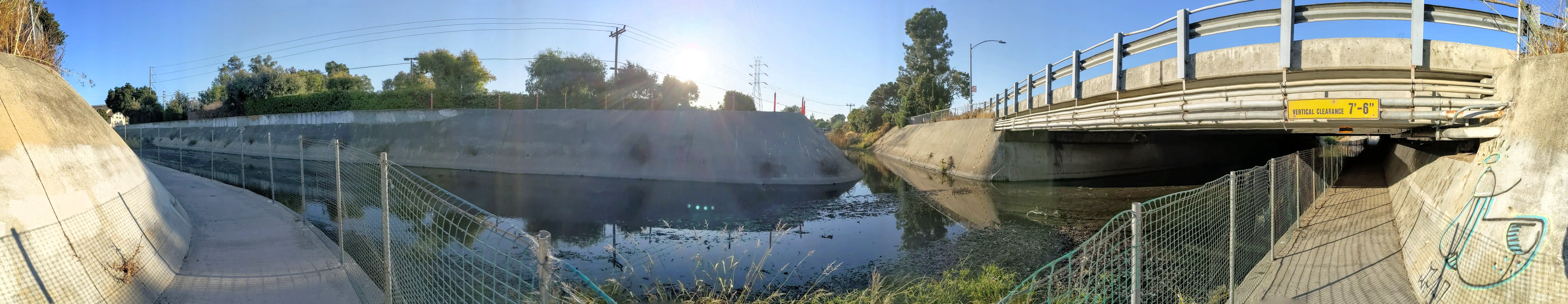
Panoramic view with Barron Creek confluence (center-right) and US Highway 101 underpass (right)

== See also ==
- List of watercourses in the San Francisco Bay Area
- Black Mountain (near Los Altos, California)
