= Barron Creek =

Barron Creek Dry Creek
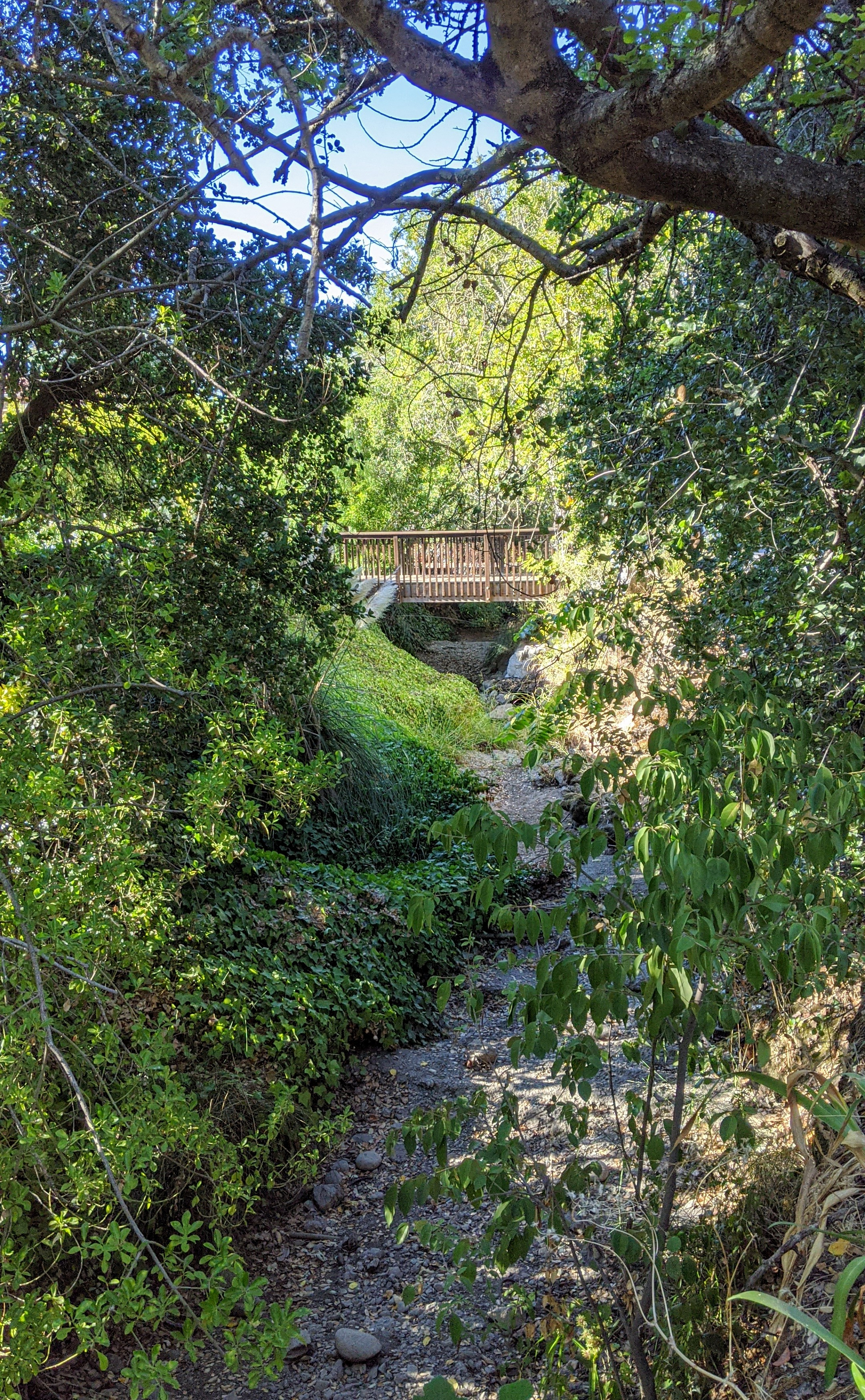
- Barron Creek along Los Robles Avenue in Barron Park, Palo Alto, where homes have driveway bridges over the creek

Location
- Country: United States
- State: California
- Region: Santa Clara County
- Cities: Los Altos Hills, Palo Alto, California

Physical characteristics
- Source
  - location: Los Altos Hills, California
  - coordinates: 37°22′19″N 122°08′05″W
  - elevation: 350 ft (110 m)
- Mouth: Confluence with Adobe Creek just south of U.S. Highway 101
  - location: Palo Alto, California
  - coordinates: 37°26′02″N 122°06′33″W
  - elevation: 10 ft (3.0 m)

Barron Creek is a 5.8-mile-long (9.3 km) northward-flowing stream originating in the lower foothills of the Santa Cruz Mountains in Los Altos Hills in Santa Clara County, California, United States. It courses northerly through the cities of Los Altos Hills and Palo Alto, before joining Adobe Creek just south of U.S. Highway 101. As Adobe Creek, its waters continue northwards to southwest San Francisco Bay after crossing under Highway 101 and traversing the Palo Alto Flood Basin.

== History ==
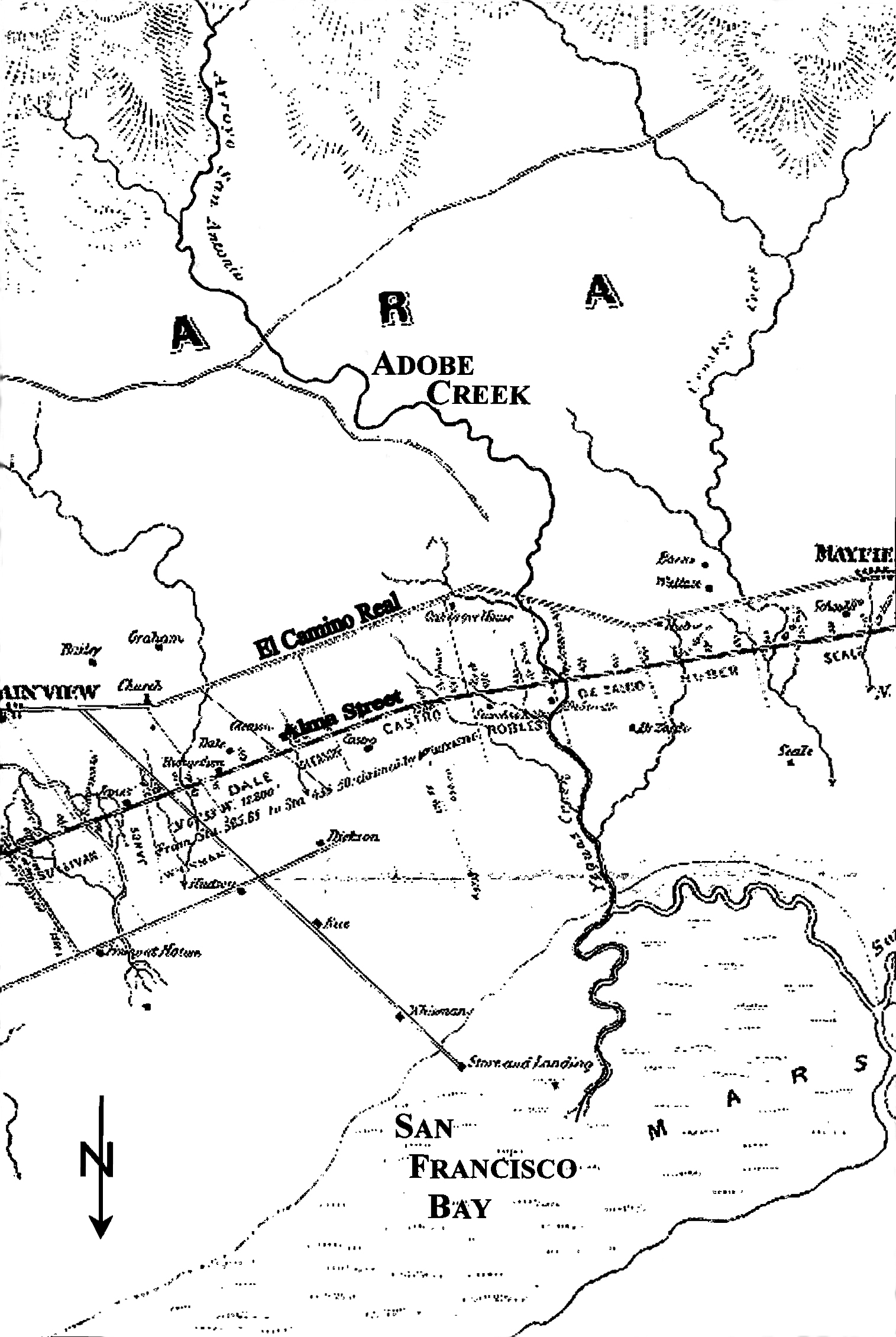
1862 George F. Allardt Map of the San Francisco and San Jose Railroad – Barron Creek joins Crosby's Creek (now Matadero Creek) south of (above) El Camino Real, as also shown on the 1899 map.

In 1844 Rancho La Purisima Concepcion was sold to Juana Briones de Miranda, whose family members had accompanied both the Gaspar de Portolà and the Juan Bautista de Anza Expeditions. Her uniquely constructed wood-framed, rammed-earth and adobe brick house, believed to have been built by American deserter sailors, is located at 4155 Old Adobe Road on the border between Palo Alto and Los Altos Hills, and is marked by a historical marker at the corner of Old Adobe Road and Old Trace Lane. Designated a California State Historical Landmark in 1954, the 160-year-old Juana Briones home was scheduled for demolition in 2007 because of damage to it by the Loma Prieta earthquake in 1989. In 2009, it still stands and has been recently documented with a Historic American Buildings Survey (HABS).

After 1831, Mexican rancho owners would logically erect their dwellings on or very near creeks. Locally, Juanita Briones's adobe was near Barron Creek.

In 1853, Elisha Crosby bought a 250-acre parcel of Rancho Santa Rita, really Rancho Rincon de San Francisquito, from the Robles family in 1853 and named it Mayfield Farm. This would later become Barron Park after Edward Barron.

== Watershed and course ==
Barron Creek drains about 3 square miles (7.8 km^{2}), arising at 350 feet (110 m) in Los Altos Hills, California. It is the most modified creek in the Lower Peninsula Watershed, with 67% of its course classified as "hardened", meaning that most (but not all) of its course north of Foothill Expressway is in a concrete channel to its confluence with Adobe Creek. When there are heavy storm flows, the Barron Creek Diversion Channel, originating just north of Foothill Expressway, is used to divert heavy storm flows from the creek to Matadero Creek.

Barron Creek, alternatively known as Dry Creek, was tributary to Matadero Creek on the 1862 Allardt Map and the 1899 Topo Map. In the 1940s, it was diverted along its own channel across Palo Alto, eventually joining Adobe Creek near the Bayshore Highway. Barron Creek is 5.8 miles (9.3 km) long, originating in the Los Altos Hills foothills at elevation 350 feet (110 m) along La Paloma Road (just north of Alta Tierra Road), then flowing north along La Paloma Road, where it is joined by a Concepcion Road fork at Fremont Road and proceeds along Fremont Road behind Pinewood School, before turning northeasterly along Arastradero Road where it is joined by another minor fork originating in Esther Clark Park. After crossing Foothill Expressway it is buried in an underground pipe just west of Gunn High School but sees daylight where the creek crosses Bol Park Bike Path in a small, man-made flood control basin, then at Laguna Avenue again enters an underground pipe running beneath Los Robles Avenue to El Camino Real. Barron Creek has been greatly modified for flood control purposes; the creek bed downstream from El Camino Real is a concrete trapezoidal channel.

In the 1800s, the Baylands marshes ended just north of Alma in Palo Alto, which explains why historical maps show area creeks appearing to terminate before they reach the Bay. Duck-hunting blinds were common in the nineteenth century along what is now Middlefield Road.

== Habitat and wildlife ==
No native fishes have been reported in the creek, save in its tidal reaches. Leidy reported no fish in a 1981 sampling, although both Adobe Creek and Matadero Creek are historic Steelhead trout (Oncorhynchus mykiss) streams.

== Trails and recreation ==
Barron Creek is best seen at the Flood and Sedimentation Basin between Gunn High School and the Regional Bikepath, which crosses the creek on a bridge across the middle of the basin.

=== Watercourse gallery ===
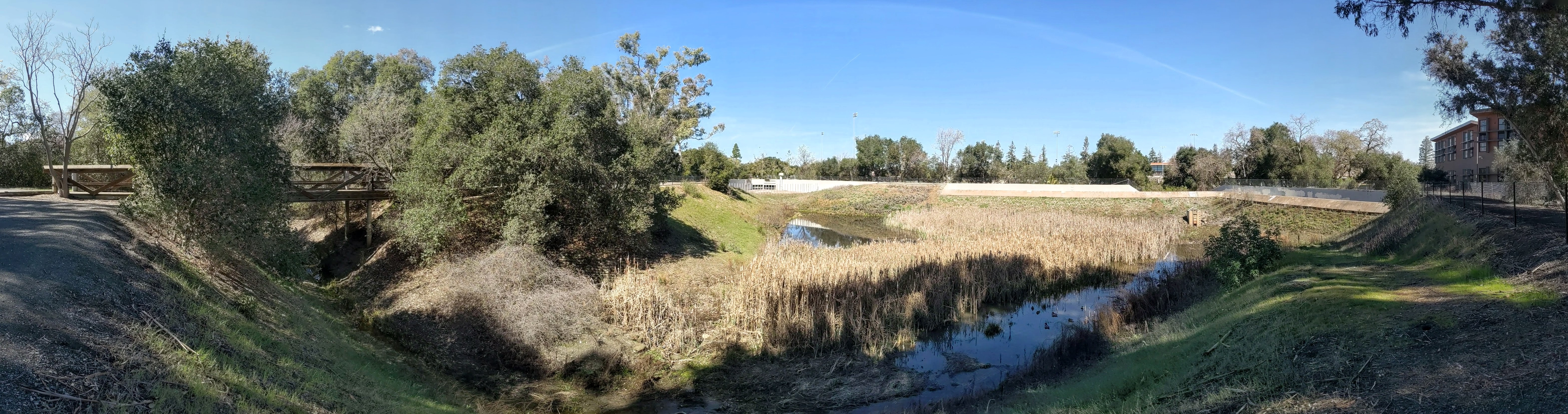
The Barron Creek Diversion Structure by Gunn High School diverts high flows to Matadero Creek through the outflow structure at the center of this panoramic view. The emergency spillway at the right dumps across the Gunn High School athletic fields if Barron Creek can't handle the flow. Barron Creek flows in under the bike path bridge at the left.
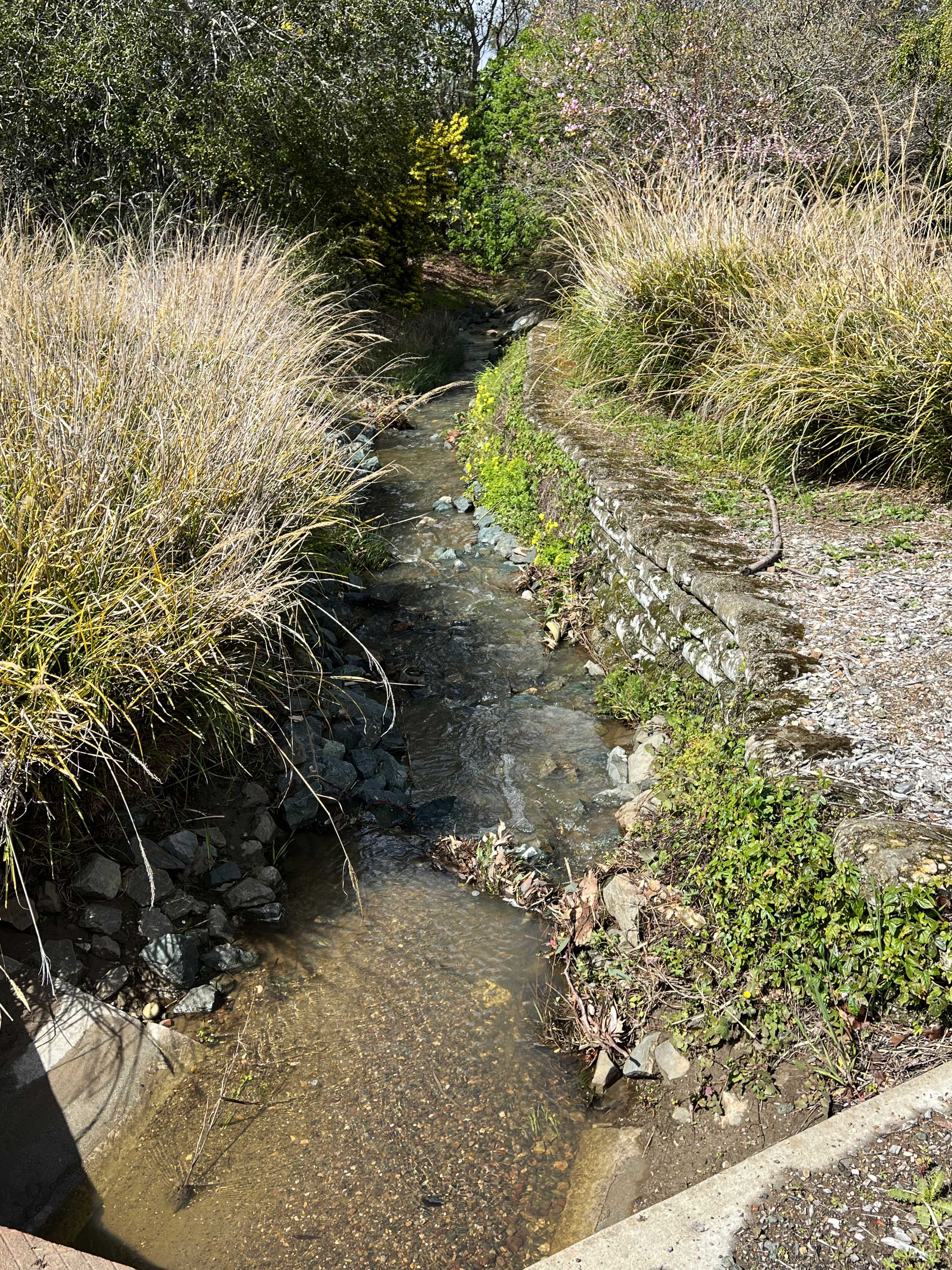
Upper reach of Barron Creek as it flows north near La Paloma Road in Los Altos Hills

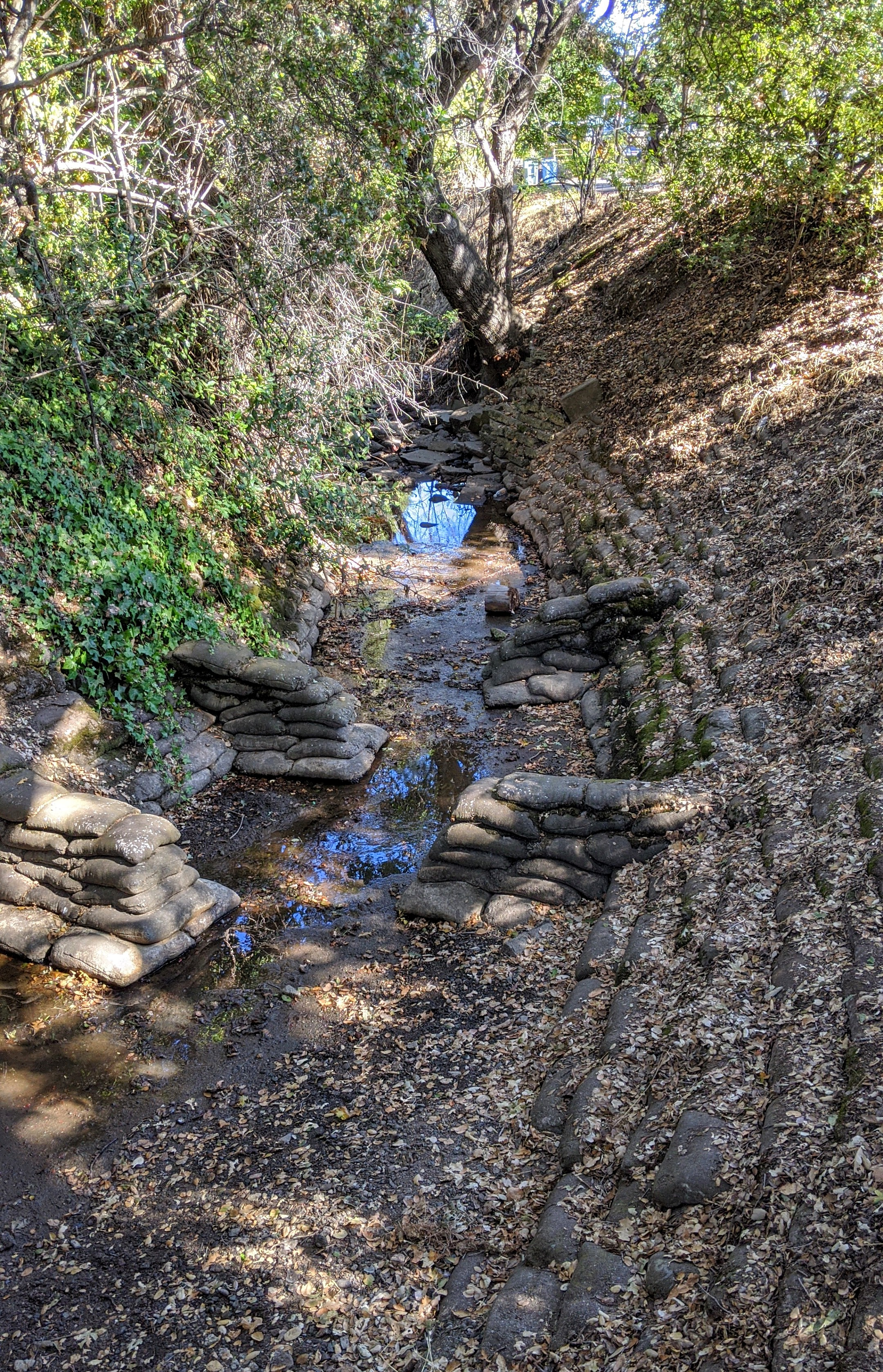
Barron Creek leaving its tunnel across Gunn High School, flowing into the open natural channel portion in Barron Park, Palo Alto

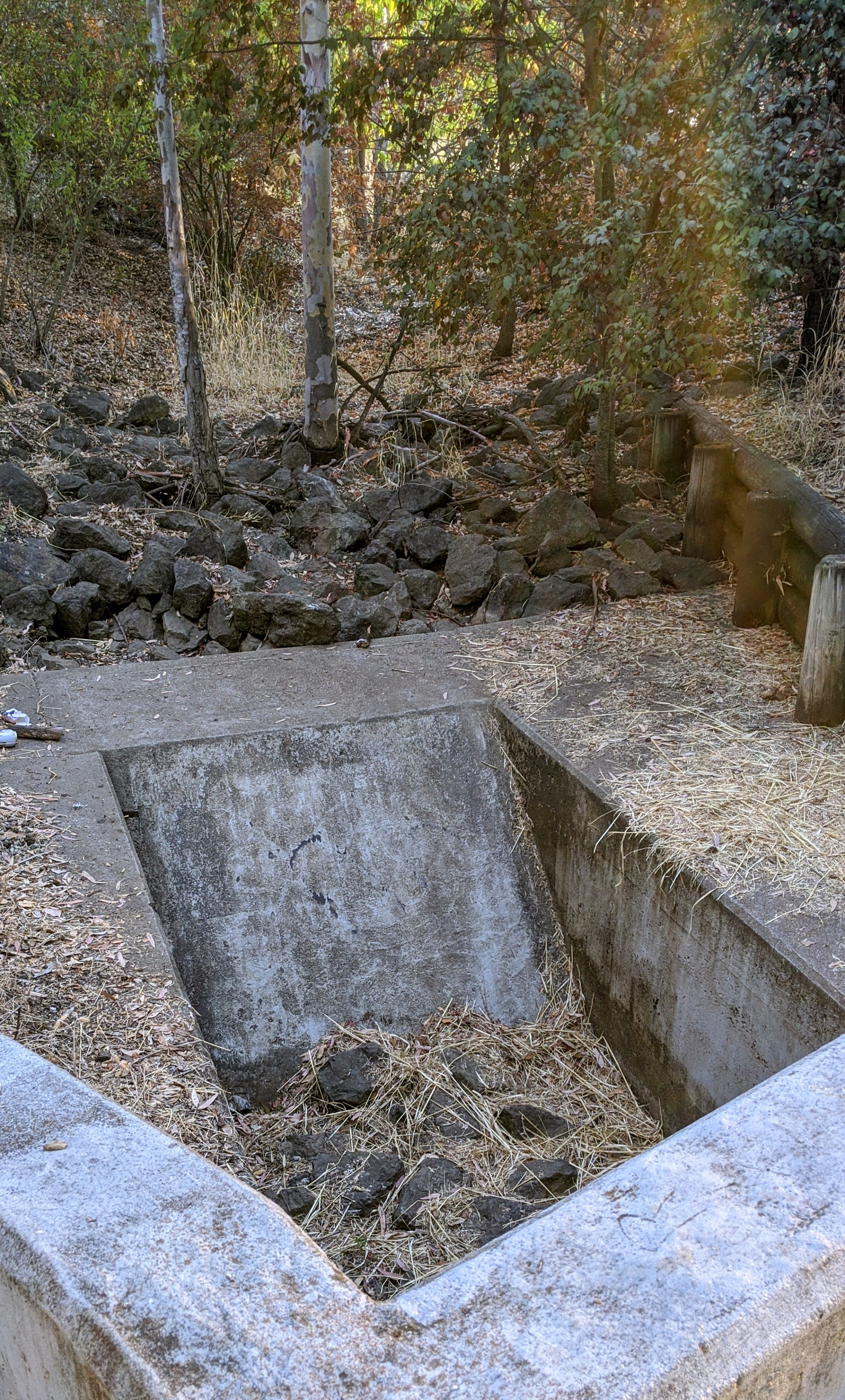
A minor Barron Creek tributary exiting Esther Clark Park to flow under Old Trace Lane, Palo Alto

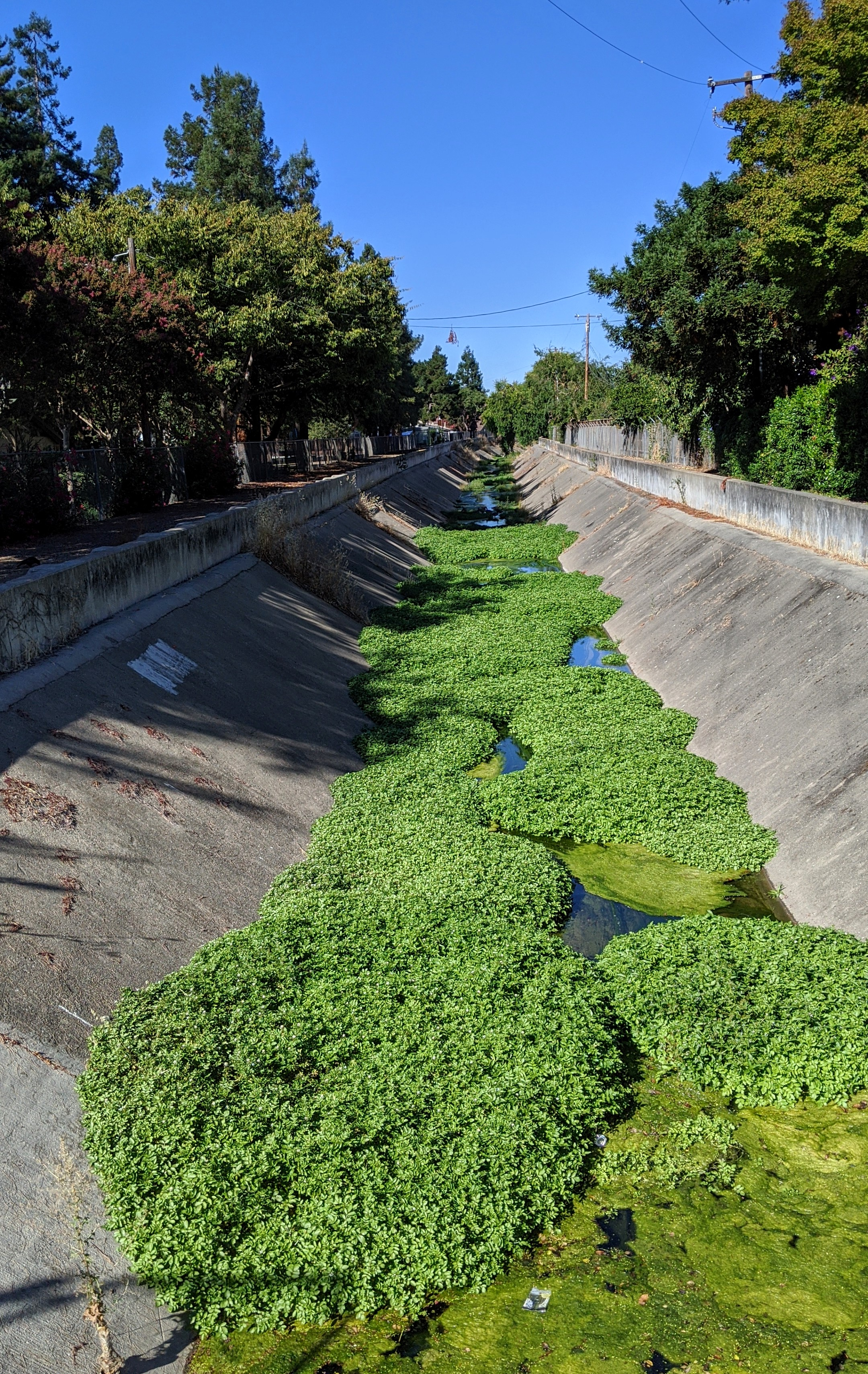
Barron Creek looking downstream from Cowper Street, Palo Alto

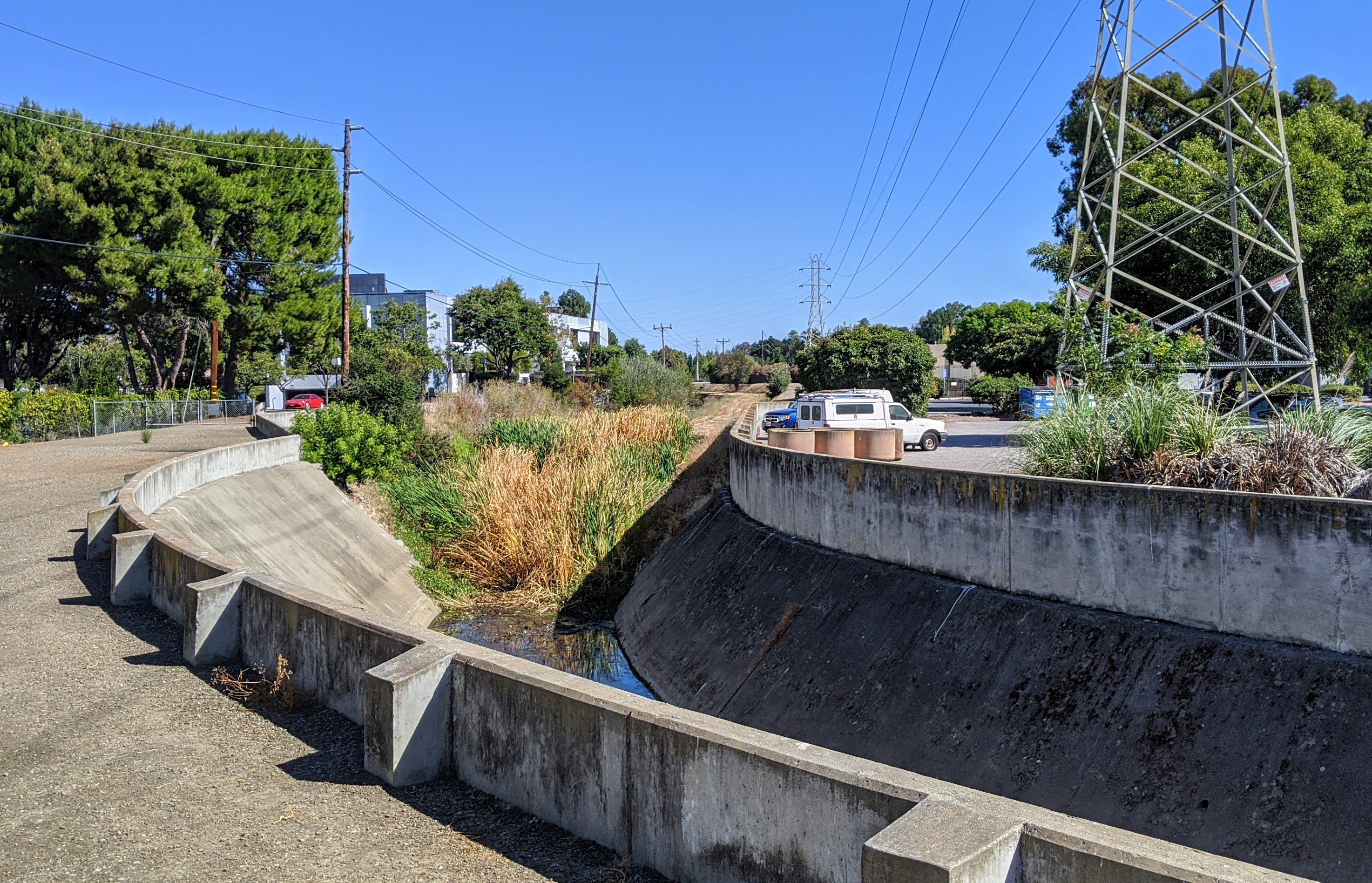
Barron Creek at West Bayshore Road, where it turns to the southeast (parallel to US 101 south) toward its confluence with Adobe Creek

== See also ==
- List of watercourses in the San Francisco Bay Area
