= Peter Drekmeier =

American mayor

Peter Drekmeier (born July 6, 1965) is Policy Director for the Tuolumne River Trust, former Mayor of the City of Palo Alto, and a co-founding member of Acterra, and worked closely with Dennis Hayes during the Earthday 1990 movement.

On April 21, 2016, the day before Earth Day, Drekmeier was lauded at Party for the Planet, an event hosted by Acterra to push business (especially in Silicon Valley) to pioneer environmental stewardship, to set an example for their global counterparts. Xerox Corporation was mentioned as an example, for dedication in 1990 of full-time engineers to reducing its environmental footprint.

Drekmeier has been a champion for people and planet - studying political science at UC Berkeley and as a promoter and example of environmental stewardship.
