= Bionomics =

Term with different meanings in ecology or economics

Bionomics (Greek: bio = life; nomos = law) has two different meanings:

- the first is the comprehensive study of an organism and its relation to its environment. As translated from the French word Bionomie, its first use in English was in the period of 1885–1890. Another way of expressing this word is the term currently referred to as "ecology".
- the other is an economic discipline which studies economy as a self-organized evolving ecosystem.

An example of studies of the first type is in Richard B. Selander's Bionomics, Systematics and Phylogeny of Lytta, a Genus of Blister Beetles (Coleoptera, Meloidae), Illinois Biological Monographs: number 28, 1960.

When related to the territory Ignegnoli talks about Landscape Bionomics, defining Landscape as the "level of biological organization integrating complex systems of plants, animals and humans in a living Entity recognizable in a territory as characterized by suitable emerging properties in a determined spatial configuration". (Ingegnoli, 2011, 2015; Ingegnoli, Bocchi, Giglio, 2017)

Bionomics as an economic discipline is used by Igor Flor of "Bionomica, the International Bionomics Institute"
