= Charleston Slough =

Body of water in California, U.S.

Coordinates: 37°26′31″N 122°05′33″W

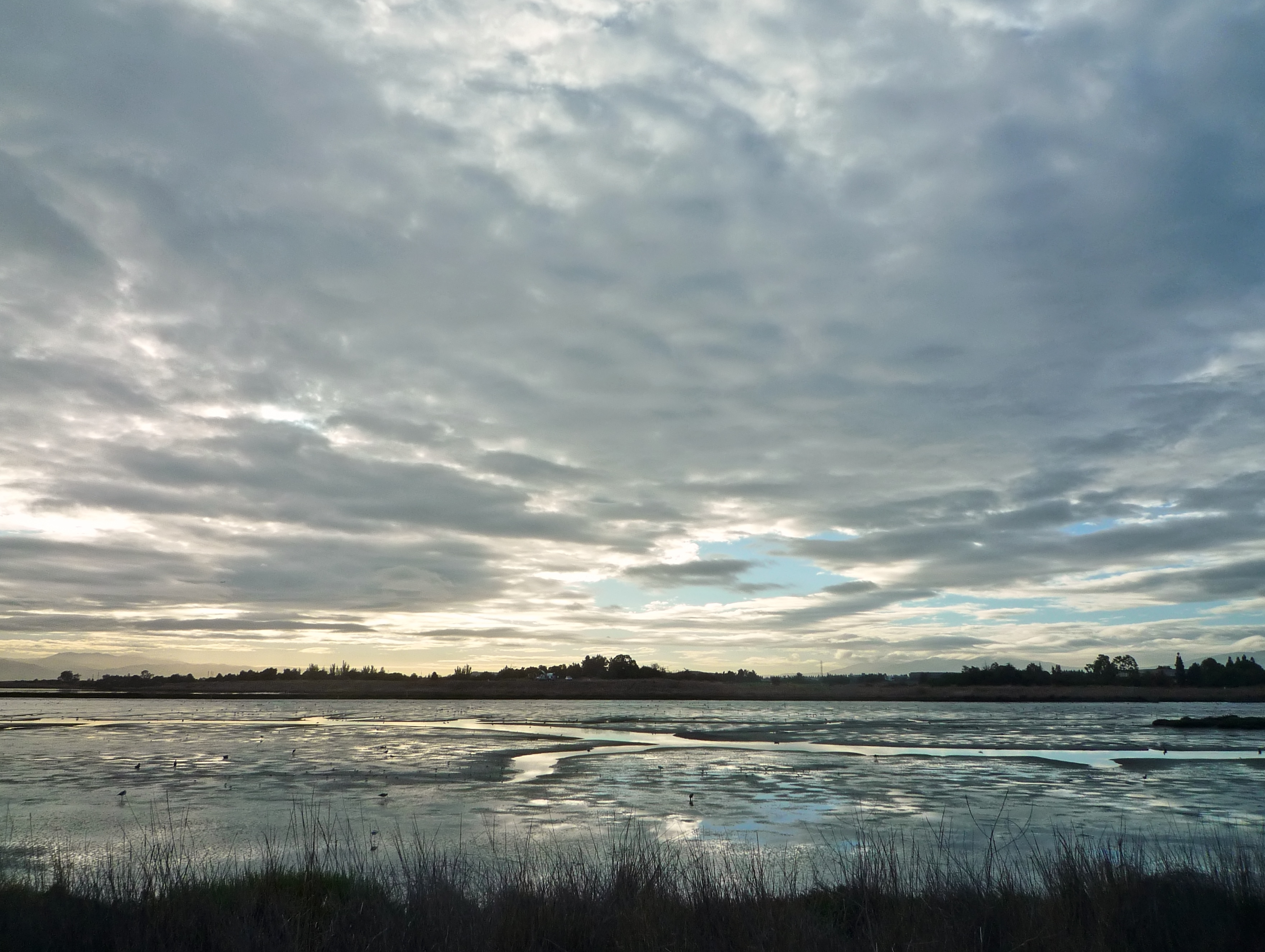
Dawn at the slough

Charleston Slough is a former Leslie salt pond that is now reverting to marsh on the western shore of San Francisco Bay.

== Environmental damage and recovery ==
In 1975 Leslie Salt owned the slough and used it for its salt water evaporation operations. The company shrunk the channel and drastically restricted the tides within the slough.

In 1996, the City of Mountain View embarked on an ambitious project to reverse the damage cause by Leslie, and returned the slough to a much more environmentally-friendly salt marsh.
