= Acterra =

Acterra: Action for a Healthy Planet
- Founded: 1970
- Purpose: Climate change, Environment, Education
- Origins: Merger of Peninsula Conservation Center Foundation (PCCF) and Bay Area Action (BAA), 2000
- Region served: SF Bay area
- Method: Community partnerships, Volunteer projects
- Key people: Lauren Weston, Executive Director, Peter Drekmeier, co-founder
- Revenue: Donations and Grants
- Website: http://www.acterra.org

Acterra: Action for a Healthy Planet is an American nonprofit environmental education and action organization based in Palo Alto, California. Its main focus is on addressing climate change through educational programs across beneficial electrification, climate-friendly food, and community resilience. Program areas include education, clean energy equity, climate adaptation, and corporate sustainability.

In 2015, Acterra received the Tall Tree Award for Outstanding Nonprofit from the Palo Alto Chamber of Commerce and the Palo Alto Weekly.
