= Houk =

Houk is a surname, and may refer to

- George W. Houk (1825–1894), American lawyer and politician
- John C. Houk (1860–1923), American politician
- Keith Houk, American airline executive
- Kendall Newcomb Houk (born 1943) American chemist
- Leonidas C. Houk (1836–1891), American politician
- Ralph Houk (1919–2010), American baseball player and manager
- Theodore W. Houk, American physician

== Other uses ==
- Houk (formerly known as Pulusuk), part of Chuuk (Truk) island group in Micronesia (6°41′14″N 149°18′5″E)
- Houk Manufacturing Company, historic factory complex in Buffalo, New York

== See also ==
- Hook (surname)
