= Hooking (disambiguation) =

Hooking is a concept in computer programming dealing with control flow.

Hooking may also refer to:

- Hooking (ice hockey), an ice hockey penalty
- Hooking (sex trade), the act of engaging in sexual activity in exchange for money or goods
- Rug hooking, a craft where rugs are made by pulling loops of yarn or fabric through a stiff woven base

== See also ==
- Bondage hook
- Fish-hooking
- Hook (disambiguation)
- Hooked (disambiguation)
- Hooker (disambiguation)
- Hooks (disambiguation)
