= Hooks =

Hooks may refer to:

== Places ==
United States

- Hooks, Alabama, an unincorporated community
- Hooks, Texas, a city
- Hooks Island, an island, New York

== People ==
- Hooks (surname)
- Hooks (nickname)

== Other uses ==
- Corpus Christi Hooks, a minor league team in the Texas League
- The Hooks, a faction in the Hook and Cod Wars
- Hooks (album), by Dutch rock and roll and blues group Herman Brood & His Wild Romance
- Hooks (grappling), a term for the use of feet and legs to control an opponent
- Hooks are used in computer programming to add or change functionality of software

== See also ==
- Hook's Drug Stores, a former American drug store chain
- Hook (disambiguation)
- Hooke (disambiguation)
- Hooke's law
