= Hook (nickname) =

As a nickname, Hook or the Hook may refer to:

- John Lee Hooker (1912–2001), American blues singer, songwriter and guitarist
- Hook Dillon (1924–2004), American basketball player
- Harry Aleman (1939–2010), Chicago mobster nicknamed "the Hook"
- Abu Hamza al-Masri (born 1958), former imam of Finsbury Park Mosque in London, England, known as "Hook" in the British tabloid press
- Anthony Griffin (rugby league) (born 1966), Penrith Panthers coach known by the nickname "Hook"
- Demetrius "Hook" Mitchell (born 1968), American former streetball player
- Hook (wrestler) (born 1999), ring name of professional wrestler Tyler Senerchia
- Hook (rapper) (born 1999), American rapper

== See also ==
- Hook (disambiguation)
- Hook (surname)
- Hooks (nickname)
