= Hooks (nickname) =

As a nickname, Hooks may refer to:

- Hooks Cotter (1900–1955), American Major League Baseball infielder
- Ray Dandridge (1913–1994), American Negro league infielder
- Hooks Dauss (1889–1963), American Major League Baseball pitcher
- Hooks Foreman (1895–1940), American Negro league catcher
- Hooks Iott (1919–1980), American Major League Baseball pitcher
- Hooks Warner (1894–1947), American Major League Baseball infielder
- Hooks Wiltse (1879–1959), American Major League Baseball pitcher

== See also ==
- Hooks (disambiguation)
- Hooks (surname)
- Hook (nickname)
