= Thomas Hooke =

Thomas Hooke may refer to:

- Thomas Hooke (mayor) (died 1670), Mayor of Dublin
- Sir Thomas Hooke of the Hooke baronets

== See also ==
- Thomas Hook (1860–1927), Ontario real estate agent and political figure
- Thomas Hook (priest), Archdeacon of Lewes
- Hooke (disambiguation)
