= Palo Alto Baylands Nature Preserve =

Marshland in the San Francisco Bay, California

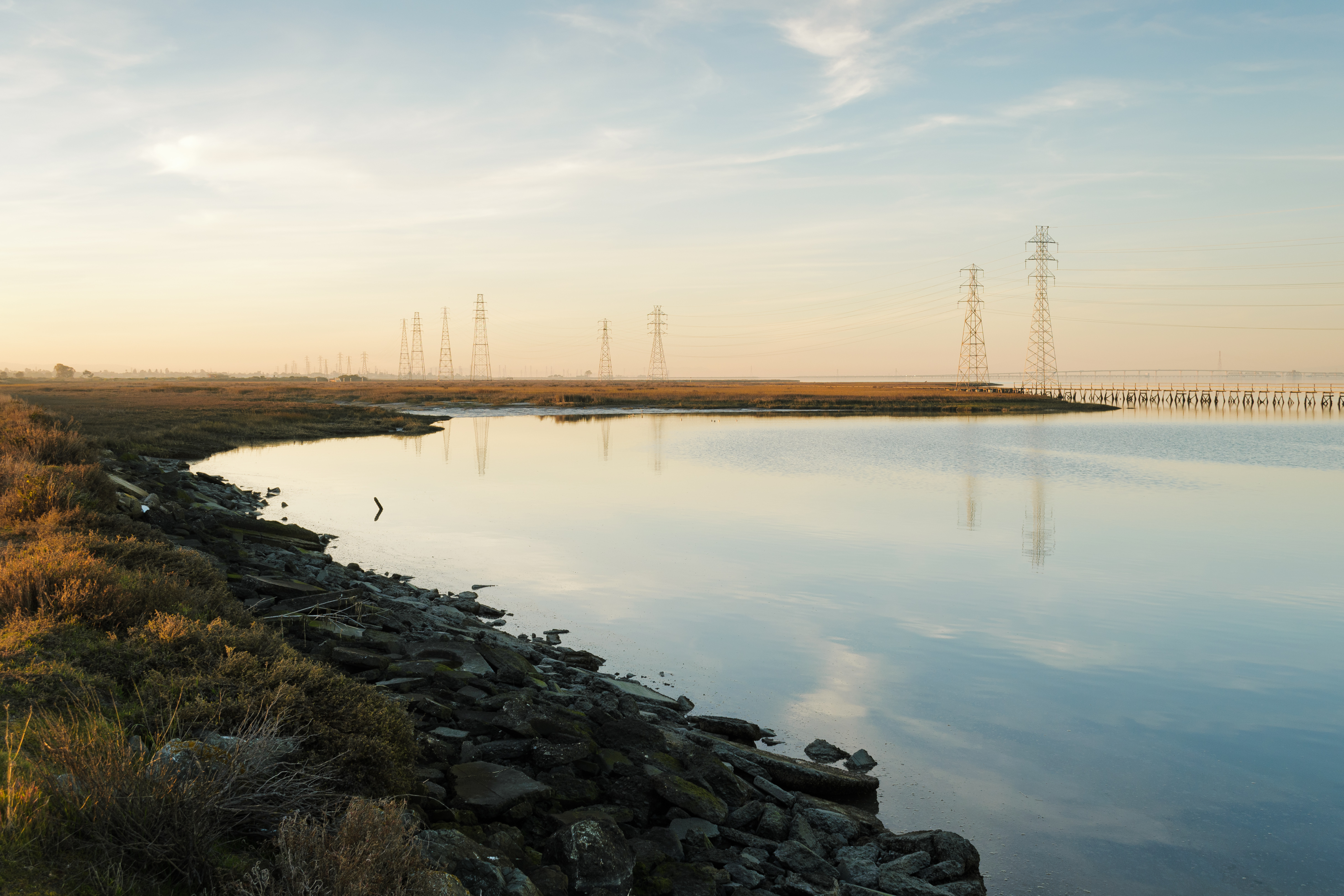
Palo Alto Baylands Nature Preserve

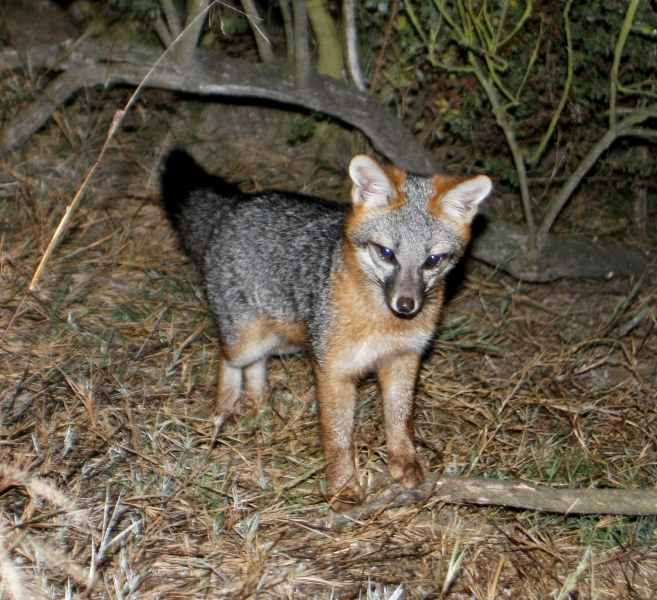
Gray fox kit at the Palo Alto Baylands

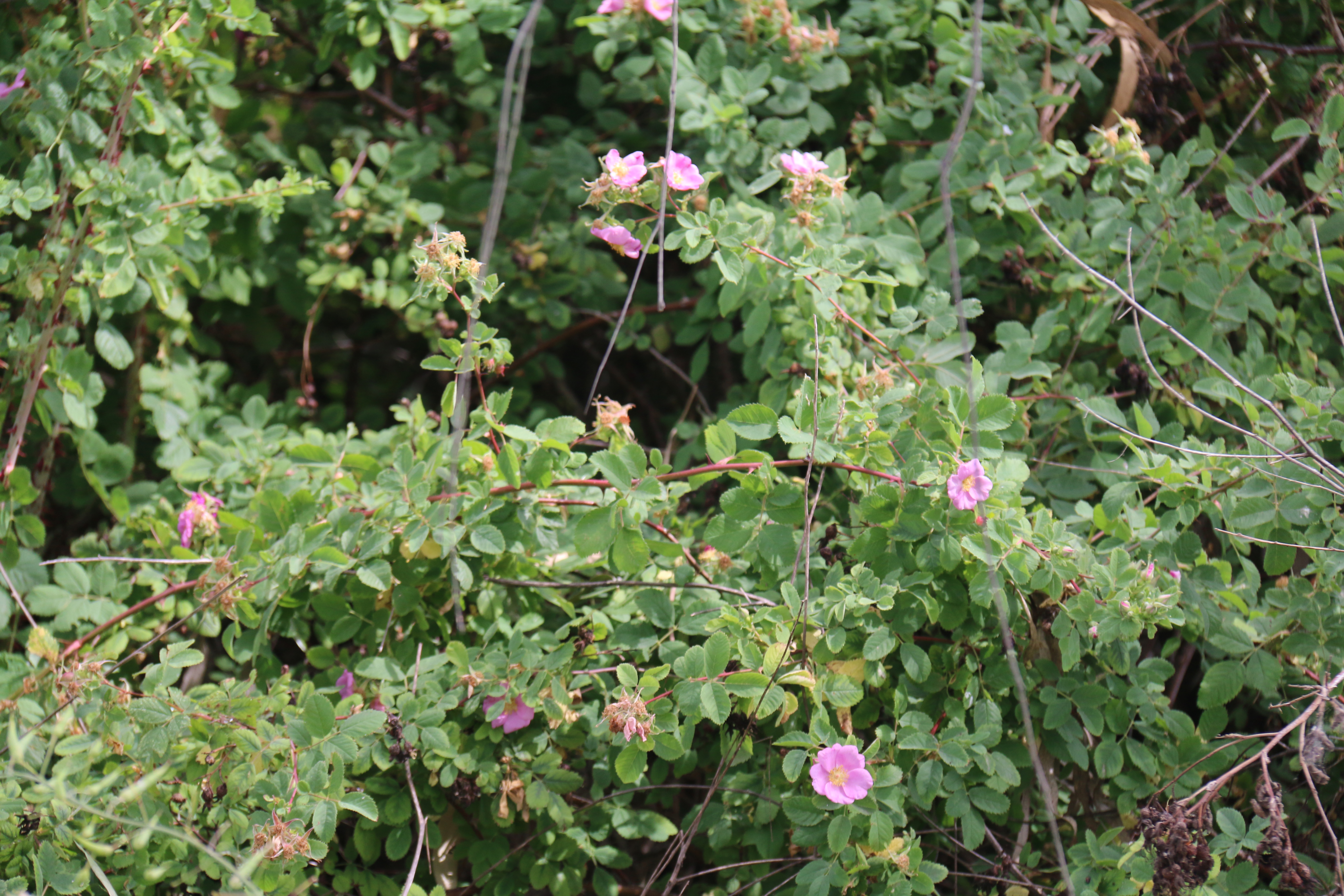
Thorny Wild California rose shelters a gray fox den in the Palo Alto Baylands along Matadero Creek.

The Palo Alto Baylands Nature Preserve, known officially as the Baylands Nature Preserve, is the largest tract of undisturbed marshland remaining in the San Francisco Bay. Fifteen miles of multi-use trails provide access to a unique mixture of tidal and fresh water habitats. The preserve encompasses 1,940 acres in both Palo Alto and East Palo Alto, and is owned by the city of Palo Alto, California, United States. It is an important habitat for migratory shorebirds and is considered one of the best birdwatching spots on the West Coast.

== Geography ==
The Palo Alto Baylands is located at 37.459608°N 122.106412°W in Santa Clara County. The preserve consists of the former Yacht Harbor area, the Palo Alto Airport, the Municipal Golf Course, the Duck Pond and public picnic area, the Baylands Athletic Center, the Sailing Station, the Lucy Evans Baylands Nature Interpretive Center, the Harriet Mundy Marsh and the Palo Alto Flood Basin. The flood basin is bordered by Adobe Creek and Matadero Creek and is maintained a couple feet below sea level in order to serve as a catchment basin in case of flooding in lower Palo Alto. At the northwest edge the Baylands extend past San Francisquito Creek, although the creek used to flow into the Bay at the site of the former Yacht Club. In the late 1920s levees were constructed to re-route San Francisquito Creek away from its former mouth, to a sharp north turn for about half a mile, then to the northeast, before exiting to the Bay. Dredging of the former Yacht Club produced landfill for the filling of marshlands to construct the Palo Alto Airport and Municipal Golf Course. By 2004, filled areas such as the Palo Alto golf course and the Palo Alto Airport had reduced the tidal marsh to 352 acres (1.42 km^{2}).

== History ==
The Byxbee Park Hills area of Baylands was named for John Fletcher Byxbee Jr., Palo Alto City Engineer from 1906 to 1941. Byxbee was a member of the first graduating class of Palo Alto High School. At Stanford University he studied under C. D. Marx, founder of the City of Palo Alto utilities system, and graduated with a B.A. in Civil Engineering with the class of 1902. At first named Assistant City Engineer, he became City Engineer in 1906.

Lucy Evans graduated from Stanford in 1929 and taught at Mayfield School for 23 years. She fought for the preservation of the Baylands, and her determination earned her the appellation "Baylands Lucy." She died suddenly in 1978. The Baylands Nature Interpretive Center was rededicated to her memory in December 1978.

The Harriet Mundy Marsh extends from Lucy Evans Nature Interpretive Center to Sand Point and was dedicated on October 23, 1982, honoring Harriet Mundy who circulated a petition which resulted in the City Council stopping development of a $30 million private proposal to develop the Palo Alto Baylands for commercial and industrial use. The Byxbee Park Hills area of Baylands was named for John Fletcher Byxbee Jr., Palo Alto City Engineer from 1906 to 1941.

The Emily Renzel Wetlands restoration project was completed in 1992, utilizing a $1,000,000 grant from the California Coastal Conservancy to enhance the salt marsh portion of wetlands with bay water, and creating a new 15-acre fresh water pond. The freshwater pond uses pumped reclaimed water from the nearby Palo Alto Regional Water Quality Control Plant and was named for former City Councilmember Emily Renzel for her tireless work over 20 years to preserve and protect Palo Alto's Baylands.

== Ecology ==
The Baylands are home to numerous species of plants and animals including the near threatened Ridgway's rail and the endangered salt marsh harvest mouse. Several gray fox (Urocyon cinereoargenteus) breeding pairs inhabited the Baylands where they are relatively safe from large predators like puma (Puma concolor), but eventually succumbed to an outbreak of canine distemper.

The tidal gate blocks access of steelhead trout (Oncorhynchus mykiss) which historically had spawning runs up both 14.2 miles (22.9 km)-long Adobe Creek and 8.0 miles (12.9 km)-long Matadero Creek. Adobe Creek has approximately 5.5 miles of perennial flow above Manresa Way in Los Altos suitable as trout spawning and rearing habitat and Matadero Creek has perennial flow for 3.9 miles above Bol Park in Palo Alto plus 1.4 miles of its Deer Creek tributary. In addition, there are 2.5 miles of Adobe Creek and 1.8 miles of Matadero Creek in the Flood Basin where young steelhead could safely rear to larger size before heading to the Bay and Pacific Ocean. The Central California Coast steelhead trout distinct population segment (DPS) has been federally threatened since 1997.

== Recreation ==
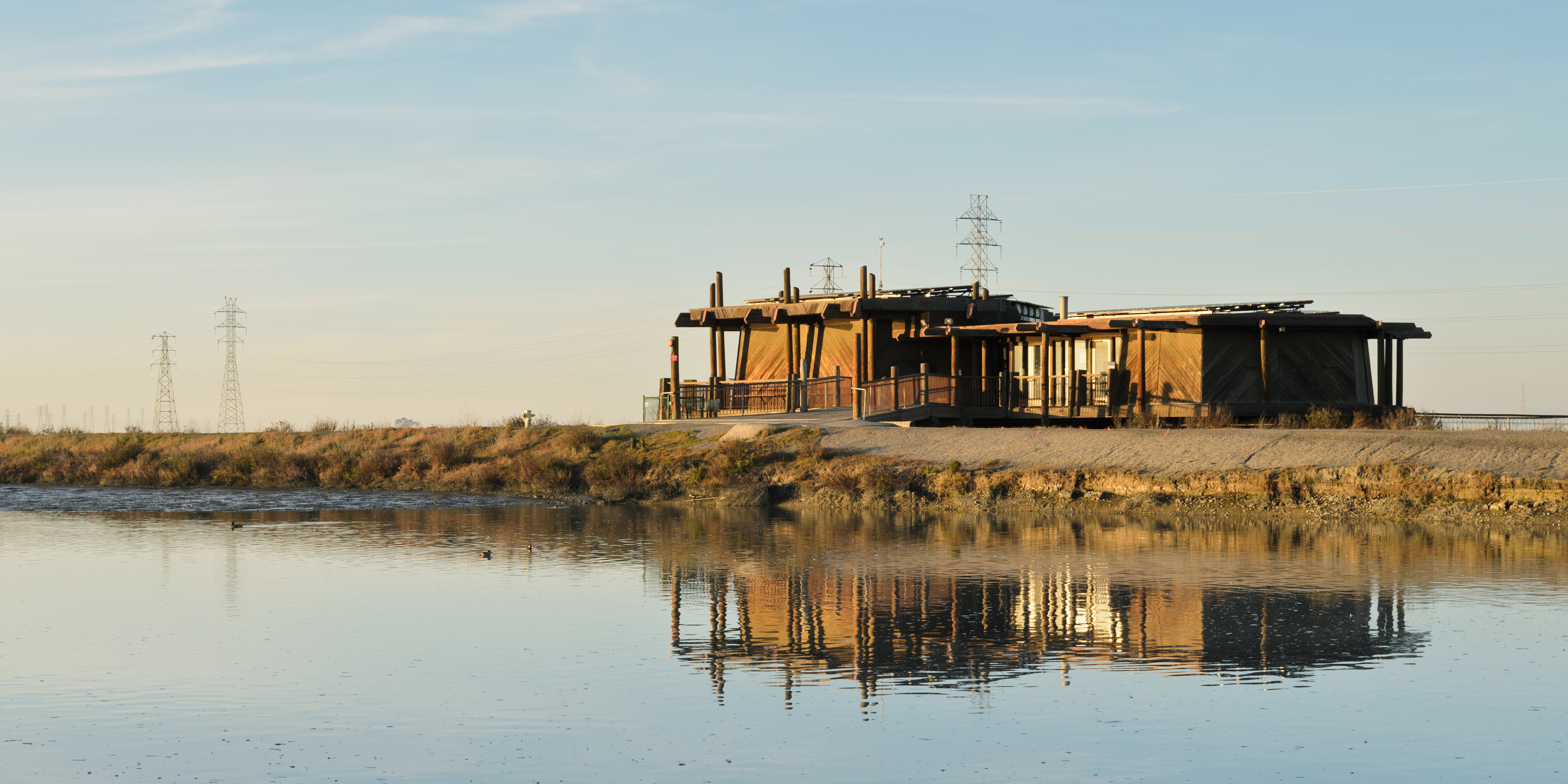
Lucy Evans Baylands Nature Interpretive Center

The preserve contains 15 miles of multi-use trails and also includes the Lucy Evans Baylands Nature Interpretive Center, the Palo Alto Duck Pond (originally built as a public swimming pool), and baseball and softball fields at the Baylands Athletic Center.

The Lucy Evans Baylands Nature Interpretive Center is built on pilings at the edge of the salt marsh. A plank walk leads a quarter-mile across the marsh to open water and a panoramic view of San Francisco Bay. The interpretive center was renovated in 2017 and the boardwalk was renovated in 2019.

== See also ==
- Adobe Creek
- Hooks Island
- San Francisquito Creek
