= Hooked =

Hooked may refer to:

== Literature ==
- Hooked (book) (1989), by Pauline Kael
- Hooked (2014), by Nir Eyal
- Hooked: Food, Free Will, and How the Food Giants Exploit Our Addictions (2021), by Michael Moss

== Film and television ==
- "Hooked" (Casualty), a 1987 television episode
- "Hooked" (Doctors), a 2004 television episode
- "Hooked" (How I Met Your Mother), a 2010 television episode
- "Hooked" (Law & Order: Special Victims Unit), a 2005 television episode
- Hooked: Illegal Drugs & How They Got That Way, a documentary on the History Channel
- Hooked, a documentary television mini-series on MSNBC
- Hooked (film), a 2008 Romanian film, also known as Pescuit Sportiv
- Hooked, an alternative name to a 1957 American film called Curfew Breakers

== Music ==
- Hooked (Great White album), 1991
- Hooked (Lucy Woodward album), 2010
- Hooked (Vanilla Ice album), 1990
- Hooked, a 2000 album by Voice Male
- Hooked, a 1990 album by The Brilliant Corners
- "Hooked", a 2003 song by Mary J. Blige
- "Hooked", a song by Why Don't We from the 2018 album 8 Letters
- "Hooked" (Dylan Scott song), 2017

== Other ==
- Hooked (horse) (foaled 30 October 2010), a champion Australia Thoroughbred racehorse
- Hooked (app), a mobile application for short stories
- Addiction

== See also ==
- Hook (disambiguation)
- Hooking (disambiguation)
