= Matadero Creek =

Stream originating in California

Matadero Creek Arroyo del Matadero, Crosby's Creek, Madera Creek
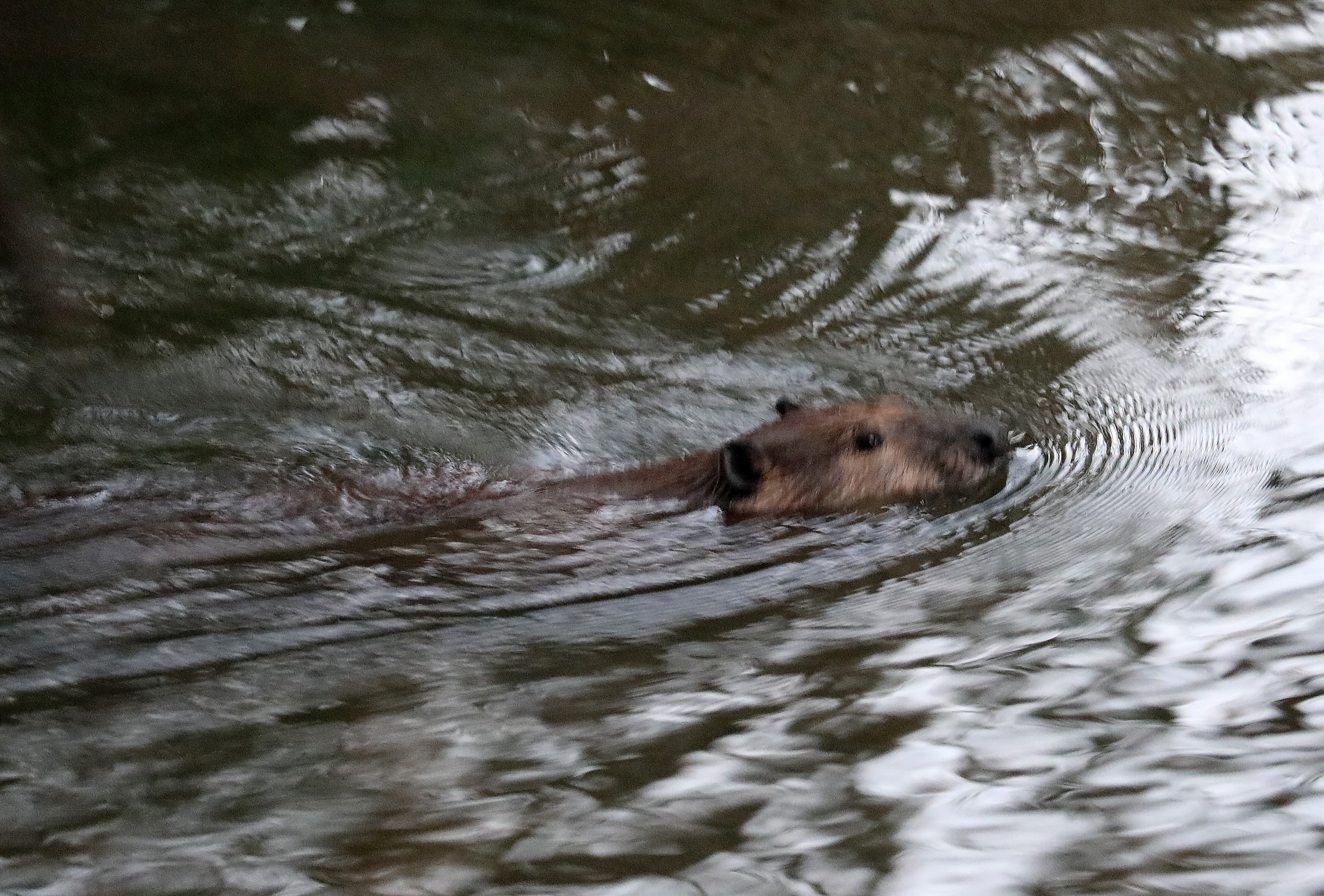
- Beaver recently recolonized Matadero Creek in the Palo Alto Baylands. Courtesy Bill Leikam September 2022

Location
- Country: United States
- State: California
- Region: Santa Clara County

Physical characteristics
- Source: Foothills of the Santa Cruz Mountains
  - location: Los Altos Hills, California
  - coordinates: 37°22′01″N 122°09′04″W
  - elevation: 640 ft (200 m)
- Mouth: Palo Alto Flood Basin, then Mayfield Slough, then southwest San Francisco Bay
  - location: Palo Alto, California
  - coordinates: 37°25′27″N 122°08′01″W
  - elevation: 0 ft (0 m)

Basin features
- Tributaries
  - left: Arastradero Creek, Santa Rita Creek via the "Stanford Channel"
  - right: Deer Creek

Matadero Creek is a stream originating in the foothills of the Santa Cruz Mountains in Santa Clara County, California, United States. The creek flows in a northeasterly direction for 8 miles (13 km) until it enters the Palo Alto Flood Basin, where it joins Adobe Creek in the Palo Alto Baylands at the north end of the Mayfield Slough, just before its culmination in southwest San Francisco Bay. Matadero Creek begins in the city of Los Altos Hills, then traverses the Stanford University lands and Palo Alto.

== History ==
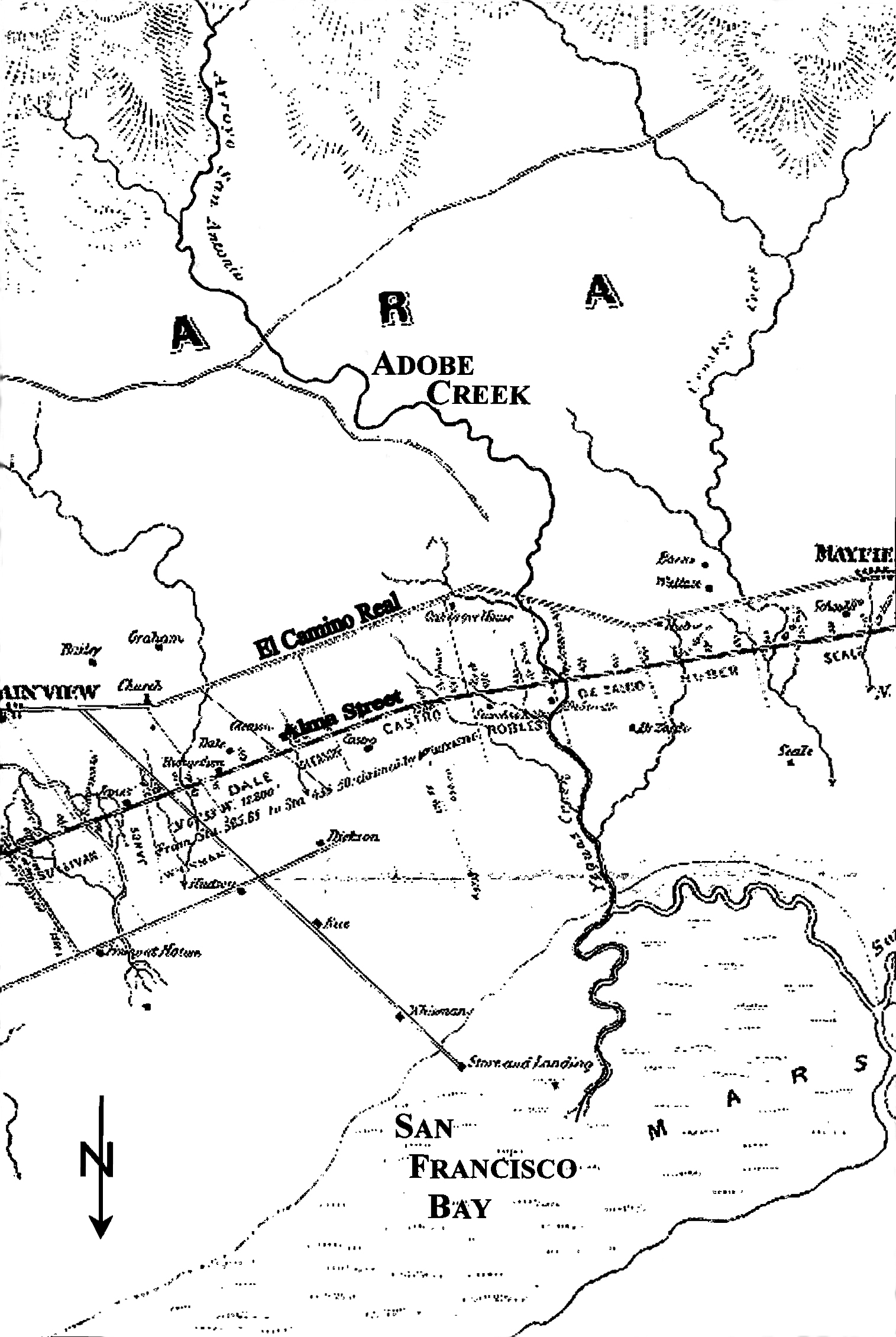
1862 George F. Allardt map of the San Francisco and San Jose Railroad – Matadero Creek (then Crosby's Creek) is featured in the upper right portion of the map and appears to end in or near the Baylands marshes. The historical presence of steelhead trout in the creek indicates that it was at least intermittently connected to San Francisco Bay during spawning runs in periods of high winter flows.

Matadero Creek was called Arroyo del Matadero on maps from the 1830s and 1840s, and matadero means slaughtering place in Spanish. On the 1862 Allardt Map of the San Francisco and San Jose Railroad, Matadero Creek is denoted as Crosby's Creek. In 1853, Elisha Crosby bought a 250-acre parcel of Rancho Santa Rita, really Rancho Rincon de San Francisquito, from the Robles family, and founded Mayfield Farm, but she lost it only 3 years later. On the March 5, 1863 map "Plat of the Rancho Rincon de San Francisquito", it is denoted as Matadero Creek. On the Palo Alto Topo Map of 1899, it was referred to as Madera Creek, a name which suggests its prior value as a source of timber (madera in Spanish).

In 1875 French financier Jean Baptiste Paulin Caperon, better known as Peter Coutts, purchased land in Mayfield and four other parcels around three sides of today's College Terrace – more than a thousand acres extending from today's Page Mill Road to Serra Street and from El Camino Real to the foothills. Coutts named his property Ayrshire Farm. His fanciful 50-foot tall (15 m) brick tower near Matadero Creek likely marked the south corner of his property. Leland Stanford started buying land in the area in 1876 for a horse farm, called the Palo Alto Stock Farm. Stanford bought Ayrshire Farm in 1882.

Famous author Wallace Stegner lived near Matadero Creek at 13456 South Fork Lane in nearby Los Altos Hills, while a professor at Stanford University. Stegner became one of the town's most prominent residents. In 1962, he co-founded the Committee for Green Foothills, an environmental organization dedicated to preserving and protecting the hills, forests, creeks, wetlands and coastal lands of the San Francisco Peninsula. Stegner's famous Wilderness Letter (1960), "helped win passage of the Wilderness Act in 1964," per Utah Gov. Huntsman in 2009. Full text of letter at The Wilderness Society Web site. Retrieved 2-24-09. Los Altos Hills named the Stegner Pathway for the author who lived for many years just uphill from that pathway running from Three Forks Lane to Edgerton Road.

== Watershed ==
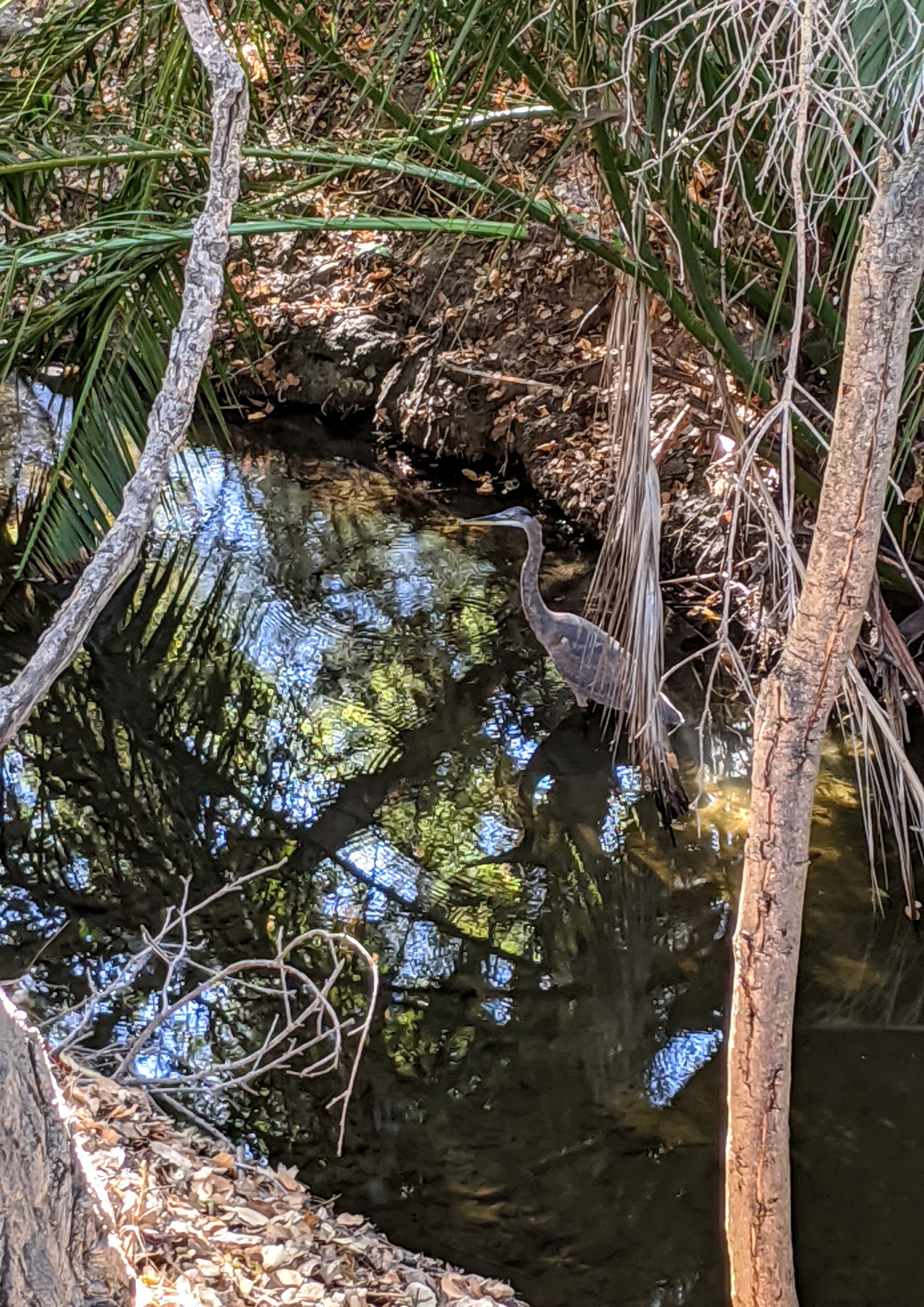
Matadero Creek at Hillview Avenue, Palo Alto, with great blue heron

Matadero Creek's mainstem begins at elevation 640 feet just north of Altamont Road and west of Black Mountain Road in Los Altos Hills. The creek has two significant tributaries, Arastradero Creek and Deer Creek. Arastradero Creek is protected by the Arastradero Preserve. Arastradero Creek begins at elevation 800 feet just south of the terminus of Alexis Drive in Palo Alto, and heads briefly west then north around the Palo Alto Hills Country Club where it is dammed to form small two small water bodies (Sobey Pond and Arastradero Lake), then joins Matadero Creek where Arastradero Road intersects Page Mill Road. Deer Creek begins at elevation 680 feet just north of Altamount Road and west of Taafe Road in Los Altos Hills, then flows northerly passing under Interstate 280 at the La Barranca Road underpass, where it turns west and parallels Purissima Road, crosses Arastradero Road and Deer Creek Road, before joining the Matadero Creek mainstem just south of Foothill Expressway and east of Page Mill Road. Deer Creek has also been labelled as Purisima Creek on some maps.

The Santa Rita Creek tributary, which drains the faculty housing area of Stanford, was artificially connected to Matadero Creek by the "Stanford Channel". Historically Santa Rita Creek terminated in the marshlands in historic Mayfield.

The Matadero Creek watershed drains 14 square miles (36 km^{2}), of which 11 square miles (28 km^{2}) are mountainous land, and 3 square miles (7.8 km^{2}) are gently sloping valley floor. Downstream of Foothill Expressway Matadero Creek has been greatly modified for flood protection. From Highway 101 to El Camino Real the creek flows through a concrete trapezoidal channel. In 1990, the concrete trapezoidal channel was extended from the CalTrain tracks to El Camino Real. On the historic 1862 Allardt Map Barron Creek was a tributary of Adobe Creek, but on the 1899 Topo Map Barron Creek was tributary to Matadero Creek, although subsequently Barron Creek was connected to Adobe Creek north of U. S. Highway 101. However, during large storm events flow may be diverted to Matadero Creek from Barron Creek via the Barron Diversion Channel.

On June 27, 2012, the creek suddenly dropped a foot and went dry below Matadero Avenue whereas it usually flows all summer from Bol Park to El Camino Real at the Creekside Inn. This may be related to the removal of toxic groundwater in the watershed, although it is normally cleaned and then returned to the creek. The creek remains perennial in Bol Park.

== Ecology ==
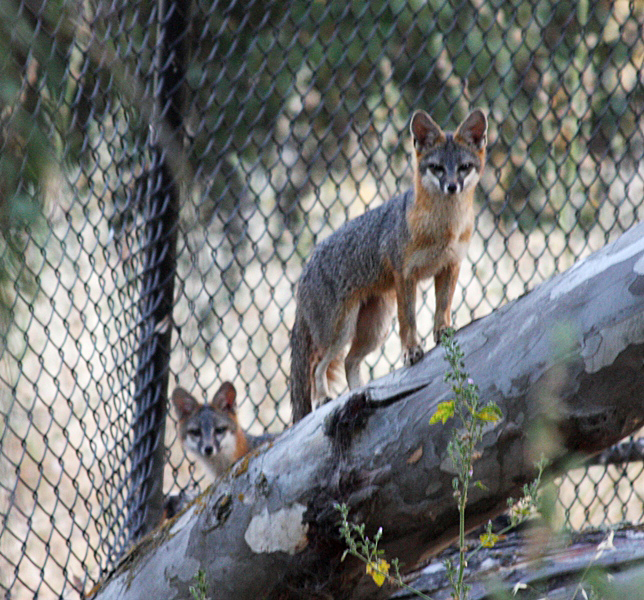
Three gray foxes (Urocyon cinereoargenteus), the only tree-climbing canid in the Americas, den and forage for rodents, grasshoppers, and berries near the mouth of Matadero Creek in the Baylands

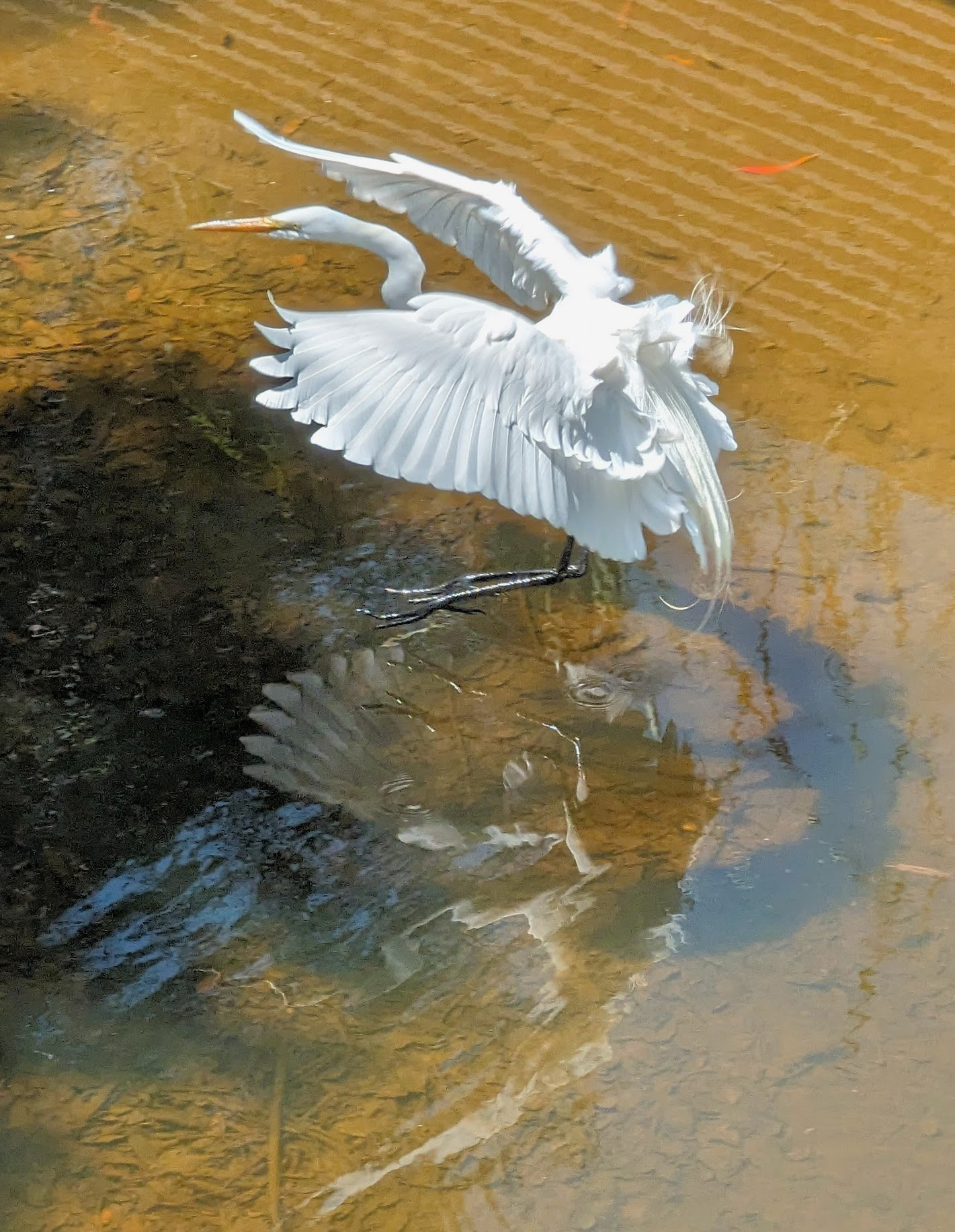
Great egret coming in for a water landing in the creek

In 2006, gray fox (Urocyon cinereoargenteus) were documented near the mouth of Matadero Creek. Populations of gray fox have increased in the South Bay since the U.S. Fish and Wildlife Service has culled non-native red fox (Vulpes vulpes) because the latter prey on endangered California clapper rail (Rallus longirostris obsoletus).

Steelhead trout (Oncorhynchus mykiss) were supported by Matadero Creek historically, and at least as recently as the late 1980s. In 1905 John Otterbein Snyder collected O. mykiss (then called Salmo irideus) in "Madera Creek", today's Matadero Creek. A California Department of Fish and Game (CDFG) field note from 1945 documents a fisherman's sighting of steelhead adults in Matadero Creek two years prior (1942/43 season). According to CDFG, steelhead were caught by local fishermen during 1985, 1986 and 1987 in Mayfield Slough at the confluence of Matadero and Adobe Creeks. At least six steelhead were noted passing the tidal gates at Mayfield Slough in the Palo Alto Flood Basin in April 1987. Also, 1986 CDFG correspondence identifies Matadero Creek as an anadromous steelhead trout stream with winter spawning runs. However, in February 1997, Leidy electrofished Matadero Creek at three sites between Laguna Street and the third downstream bridge crossing on Old Matadero Creek Road and no O. mykiss were found.

Regarding whether steelhead trout could have accessed Matadero Creek historically, since it appears to have terminated in an alluvial fan prior to reaching Bay marshlands, Snyder wrote in 1905 about a historical connection that formed when some willows deflected San Francisquito Creek to Matadero Creek, allowing Sacramento suckers (Catostomus occidentalis) to ascend the latter creek, where they had not been seen before despite eight years of monitoring. It is also possible that very high flows would have connected the historical Matadero Creek to the Bay's tidal marshes in flood years. Matadero Creek has been lengthened to connect to Adobe Creek in Mayfield Slough in the Palo Alto Flood Basin. Matadero Creek is perennial from Bol Park to its headwaters as is it Deer Creek tributary, offering 4.1 miles (6.6 km) and 2.6 miles (4.2 km) respectively for a total of 6.7 miles (10.8 km) potential spawning and rearing habitat for steelhead.

In June, 1980 local residents spotted a milky substance in the creek that was determined to be wheelchair cleaning solvent dumped into the waters by the Veterans Administration Medical Center. The large population of resident Pacific tree frogs (Pseudacris regilla) near the creek was nearly extirpated. In the 1970s the "nightly tree frog chorus along Matadero Creek was almost deafening in the mating season and loud during all the warmer months", according to Barron Park historian, Douglas Graham. Despite several efforts to re-introduce tree frogs from neighboring Barron Creek and Lake Lagunita, as of 2008 they have only recovered to 5%-10% of their original numbers.

The Urban Wildlife Research Project conducted an environmental DNA (eDNA) survey of the intertidal/lower reaches and perennial upper reaches (from Bol Park up) of mainstem Matadero Creek and its two main tributaries, Deer Creek and Arastradero Creek, on May 17 and May 25, 2025, respectively. The eDNA survey found no evidence of steelhead/rainbow trout, suggesting that the tidal gate and the long concretized rectangular channel from El Camino Real to U.S. Highway 101 act as complete barriers to once historical trout spawning runs. In addition, eDNA detected non-native American bullfrogs (Lithobates catesbeianus) in both Arastradero Reservoir and Sobey Pond, artificial ponds on the Arastradero Creek tributary. These invasive bullfrogs prey upon and may have extirpated native California red-legged frogs (Rana draytonii). However Pacific tree frog eDNA was found at many sites as were several native fish species including Sacramento sucker, California roach (Hesperoleucus symmetricus), sculpin/probably inland riffle sculpin (Cottus gulosus) and three-spined stickleback (Gasterosteus aculeatus). For the first time, Sacramento blackfish (Orthodon microlepidotus) were found in Matadero Creek. Many non-native fish species were found in the lower reaches in the Baylands. In addition, Arastradero Reservoir was found to harbor non-native largemouth bass ((Micropterus nigricans)) and mosquitofish (Gambusia affinis), both likely planted by humans.

Acterra monitors insects in the creek, which serve as indicator species for the cleanliness and health of the stream.

In 2022 a pair of North American beaver (Castor canadensis) were documented in the mouth of Matadero Creek in the Palo Alto Flood Basin. A baby beaver was spotted on a trail camera in 2023. These beaver likely descended from beaver translocated to upper Los Gatos Creek at Lexington Reservoir in the 1980s, who subsequently migrated downstream to the Guadalupe River. Upon reaching saltwater, the beaver have used it to recolonize several other south San Francisco Bay tributaries.

== The Palo Alto Flood Basin ==
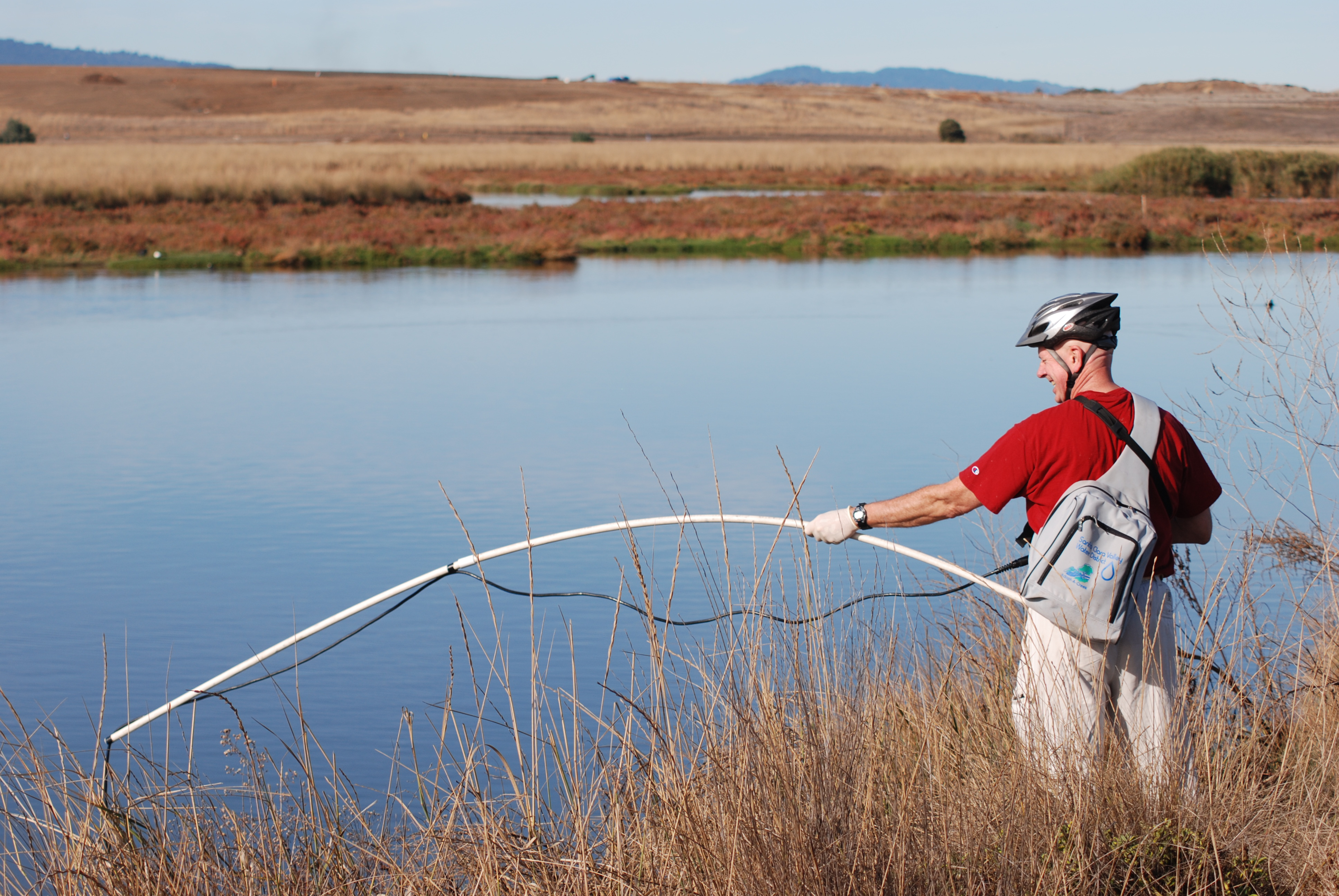
Jim McCarthy, Adobe and Matadero Creek Streamkeeper, was honored by the Santa Clara County Creeks Coalition for his work to restore the creek. Here he measures temperature, dissolved oxygen, salinity, copper levels, and turbidity 2010.

The Palo Alto Flood Basin was constructed in 1956 in order to prevent a repeat of the floods of 1955, when a high tide prevented the escape of heavy runoff from Matadero, Adobe, and Barron Creeks into the San Francisco Bay. The trapped runoff waters overflowed upstream creek banks and caused severe flooding in Palo Alto. In order to control the flow of water into the flood basin, a tidegate was placed at the confluence of Adobe Creek, Matadero Creek, and the San Francisco Bay, so that the flood basin could be maintained at approximately 2 feet below sea level, creating room to absorb floodwaters. The tidegate consists of several weirs and one operator-controlled sluice gate that enables tidal flows into the basin in order to improve water quality and for mosquito control. Three agencies oversee the tidegates: Santa Clara Valley Water District, City of Palo Alto, and Santa Clara County Vector Control. Because the trash grate and weirs separate the mouth of the flood basin from the San Francisco Bay estuary, large fish cannot swim freely between the Bay and the basin, unless the sluice gate is open. In addition, the tidegates are set to reduce tidal inflows into the basin, so that the basin is mostly freshwater. After a rainstorm the tidegate is kept closed, however this is precisely when steelhead trout in-migrations should occur.

From November 16 to 20, 2002, approximately 100 striped bass (Morone saxatilis), 5 bat rays (Myliobatis californica) and 2 leopard sharks (Triakis semifasciata) were found dead in the Flood Control Basin in both Adobe and Matadero Creeks within one mile of the tidegate. The fishkill was attributed to the first large rainstorm washing a large amount of leaf litter into the basin, leading to eutrophication and low dissolved oxygen. This is supported by the fact that the dead fish were all large (requiring more oxygen) at 2 to 4 feet long and the mouths and gills of the bass were fully extended open.

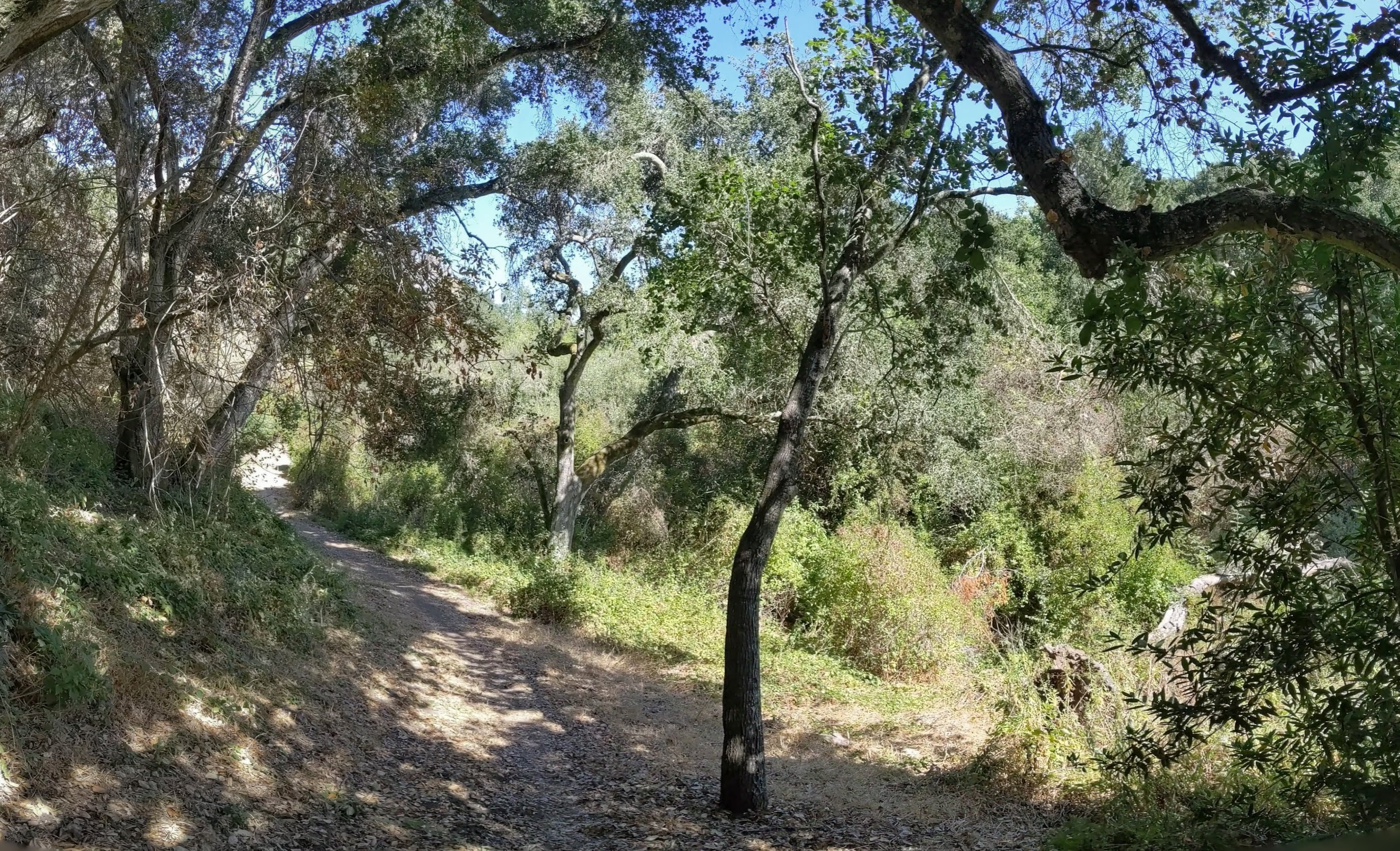
The Wallace Stegner Pathway along Matadero Creek in Los Altos Hills, California

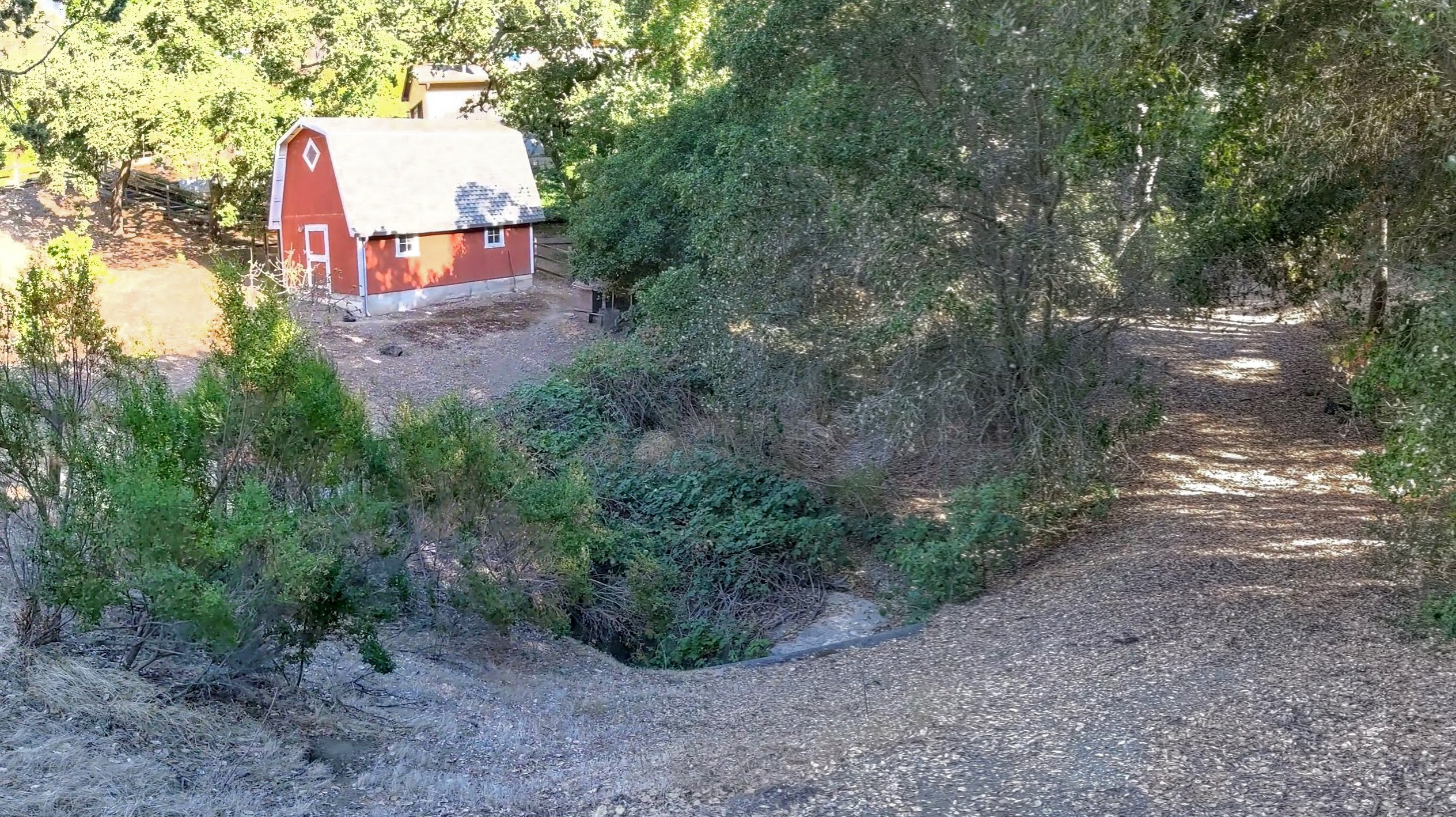
Deer Creek approaching the culvert at La Barranca Road, Los Altos Hills

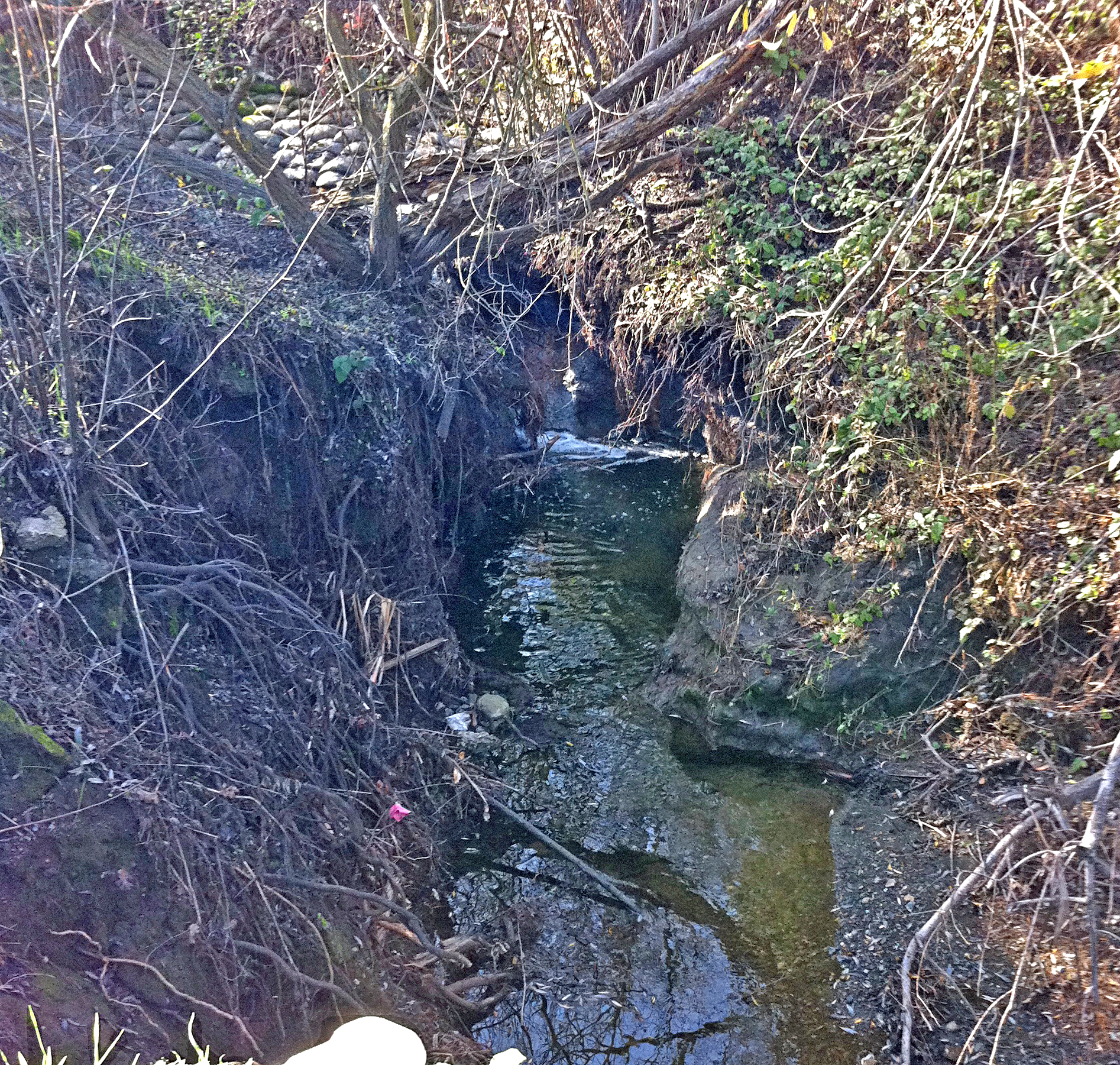
Concretization of Matadero Creek's banks (in back of shot) accelerates stream flows, causing severe channel incision which is now threatening Page Mill Road below the Arastradero Road intersection Jan. 2011

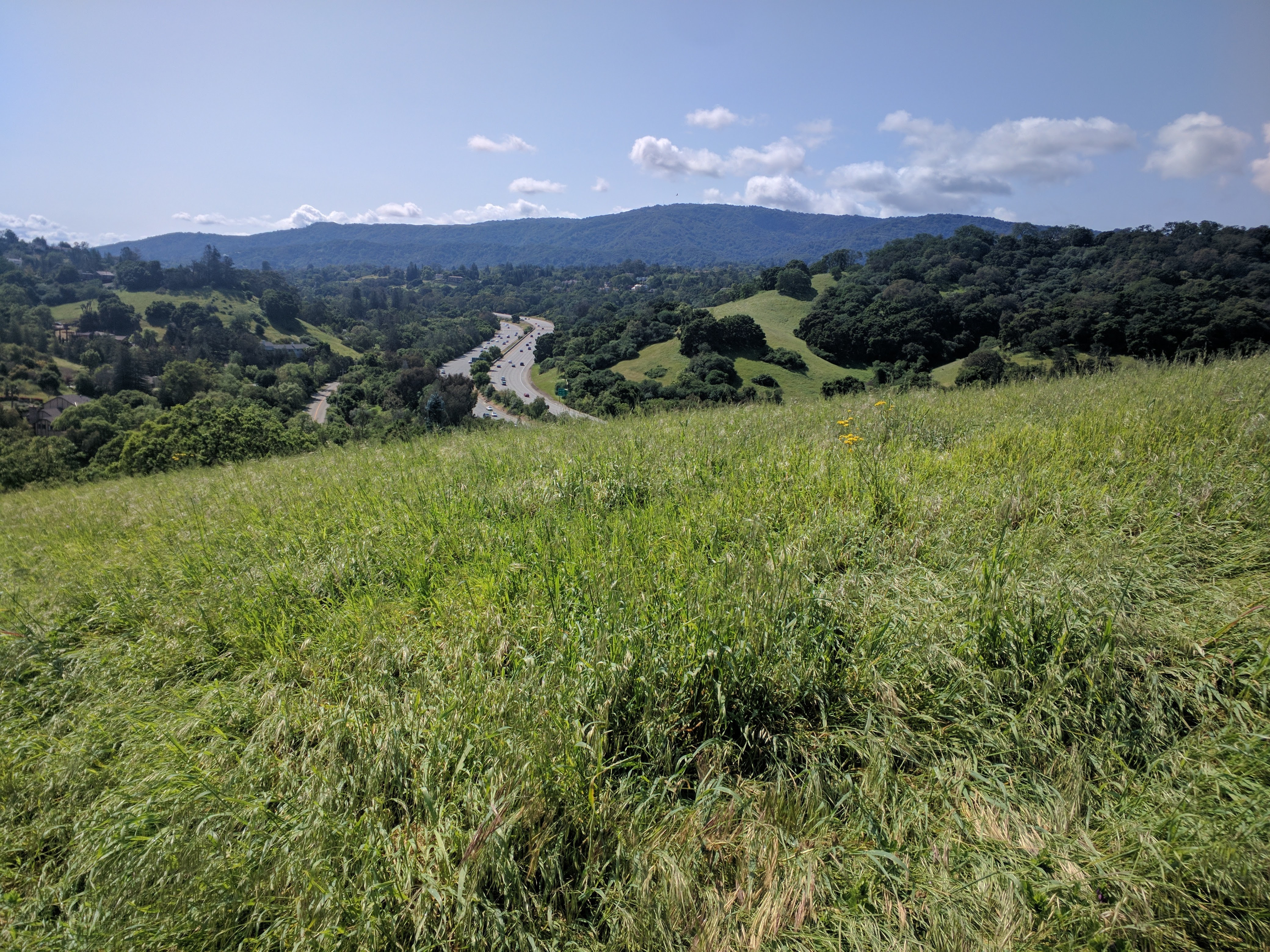
View of Interstate 280 from the Matadero Creek Trail, which crosses the hill between Matadero Creek and its Deer Creek tributary

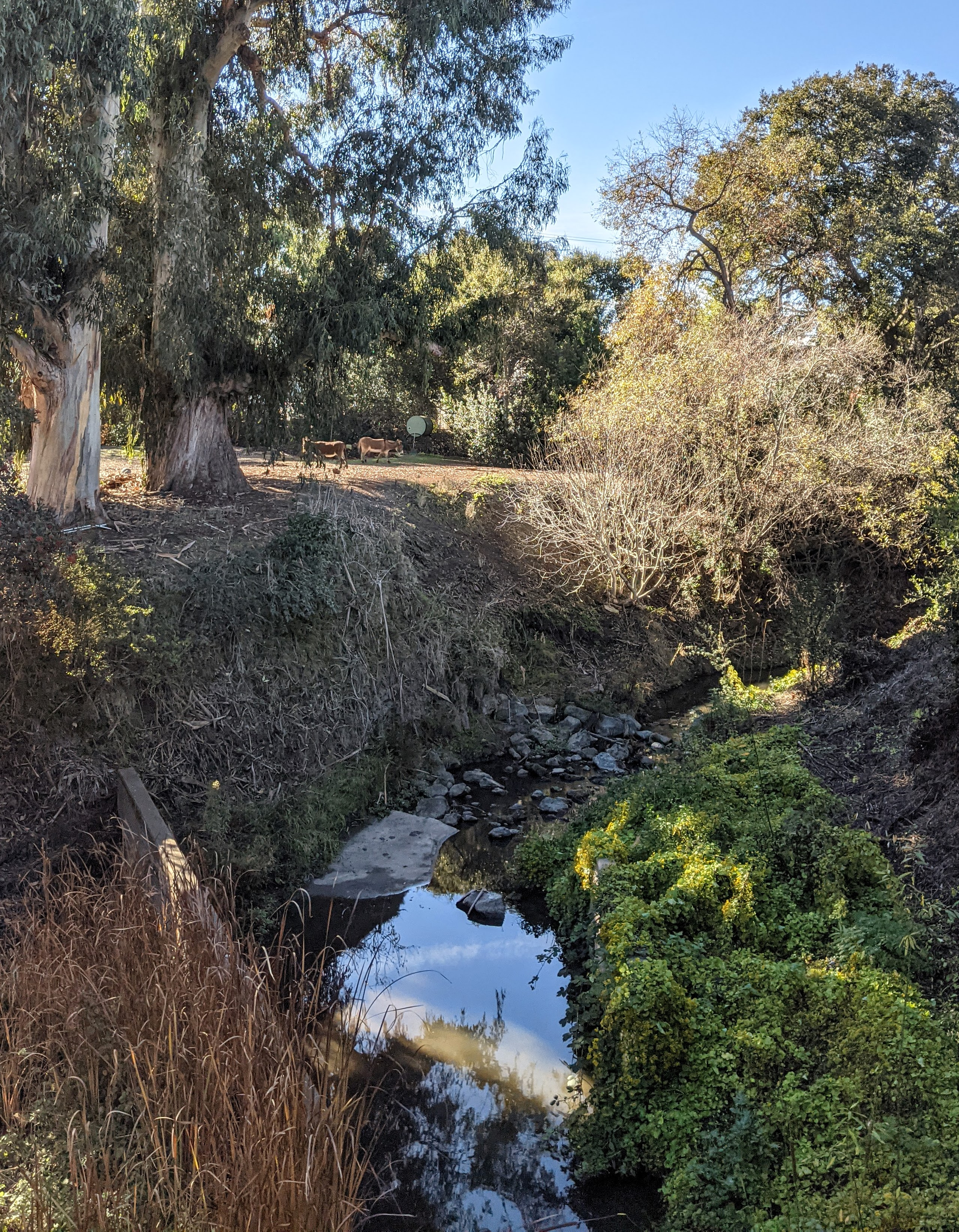
Matadero Creek and the Barron Park donkeys, viewed from the trail through Bol Park

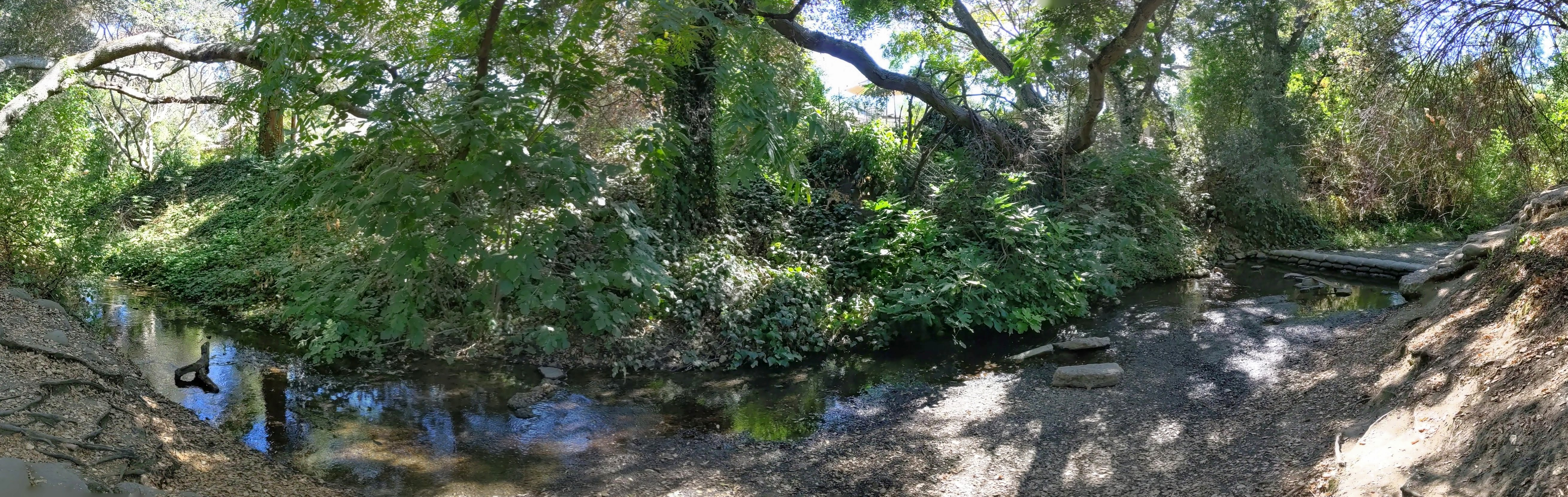
Matadero Creek at Cornelis Bol Park in Barron Park, Palo Alto, California

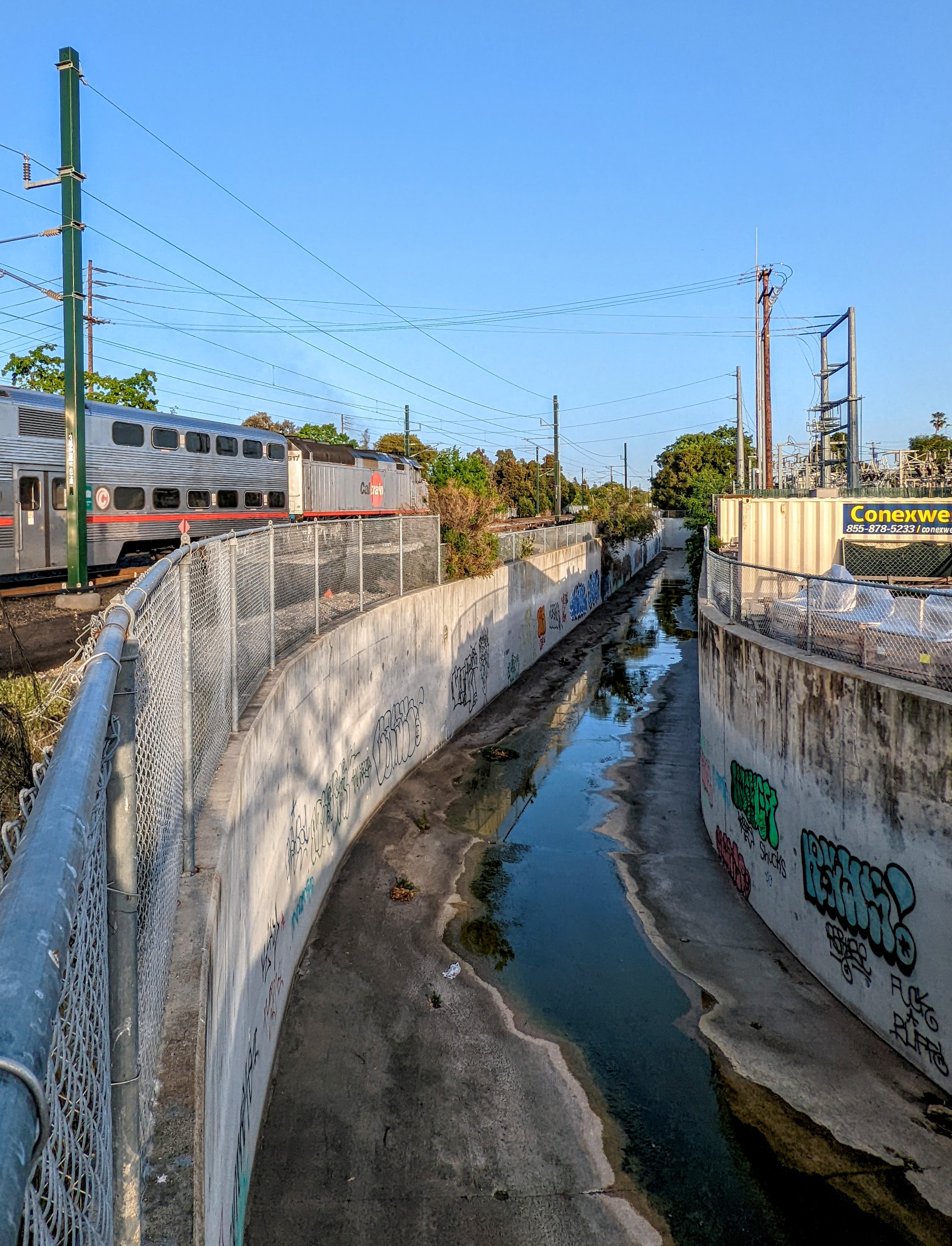
After crossing to the north of Lambert Ave in Palo Alto, Matadero Creek makes a turn to the southeast along the Caltrain tracks before crossing under them.

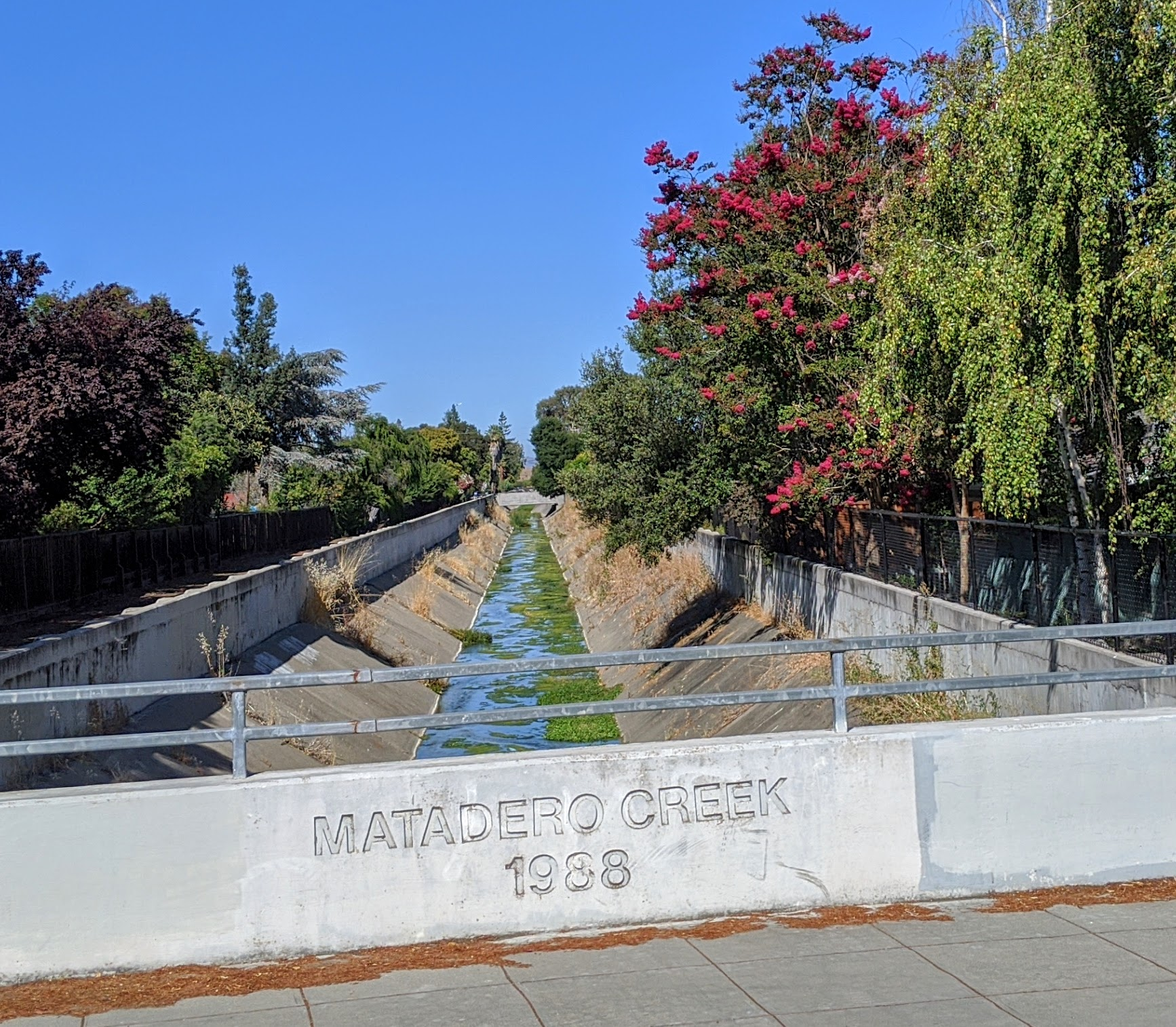
Matadero Creek from Ross Road bridge

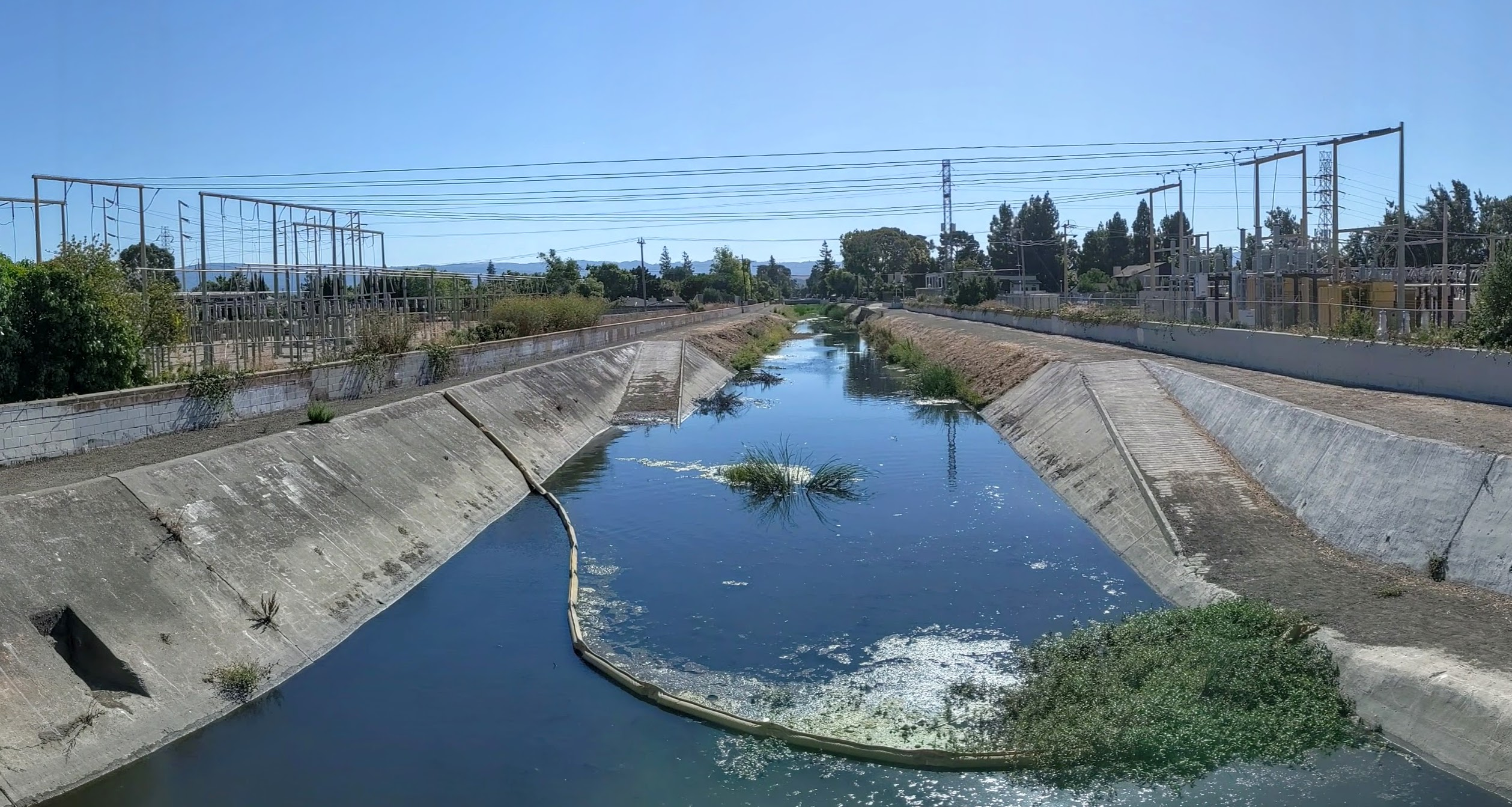
Matadero Creek at West Bayshore Road, near Highway 101 in Palo Alto, looking south. The concrete channel is very wide by then to carry large flows.

== See also ==
- List of watercourses in the San Francisco Bay Area
- Palo Alto, California
- Rancho Rincon de San Francisquito
