= Hooke (surname) =

Hooke is a surname. Notable people with the surname include:

- Hilda Mary Hooke (1898–1978), Canadian writer
- John Hooke (1270–1275), Chancellor of the University of Cambridge
- Luke Joseph Hooke (1716–1796), Irish theologian
- Robert Hooke (1635–1703), English natural philosopher who discovered Hooke's law
- S. H. Hooke (1874–1968), English scholar of comparative religion
