= Hooks (surname) =

Hooks is an English surname. Notable people with the surname include:

- Benjamin Hooks (1925-2010), American civil rights leader
- Brian Hooks (born 1973), American actor, writer and director
- Brian Hooks (nonprofit leader), American philanthropist
- Charles Hooks (1768–1843), United States Representative from North Carolina
- Ellis Hooks (born 1974), American blues singer and songwriter
- Gene Hooks (1928–2026), American baseball player, coach and administrator
- George Hooks (born 1945), Democratic member of the Georgia Senate
- Jan Hooks (1957-2014), American actress and comedian best known for her work on the TV comedy show Saturday Night Live
- Jay Hooks (born 1967), American guitarist, singer and songwriter
- Jill Hooks, New Zealand academic
- Jim Hooks (born 1950), American football player
- Kevin Hooks (born 1958), American actor and film director
- Lonna Hooks, former Secretary of State of New Jersey (1994-1998)
- Mitchell Hooks (1923-2013), American artist and illustrator
- Robert Hooks (born 1937), American actor
- Roland Hooks (born 1953), American retired National Football League running back

== See also ==
- bell hooks, pen name of American author, theorist, educator, and social critic Gloria Jean Watkins (1952–2021)
- Valerie Brisco-Hooks (born 1960), Olympic multiple-gold medalist runner
- David Hookes (1955-2004), Australian cricketer, broadcaster and coach
- Hook (surname)
