= Houk Manufacturing Company =

- U.S. National Register of Historic Places
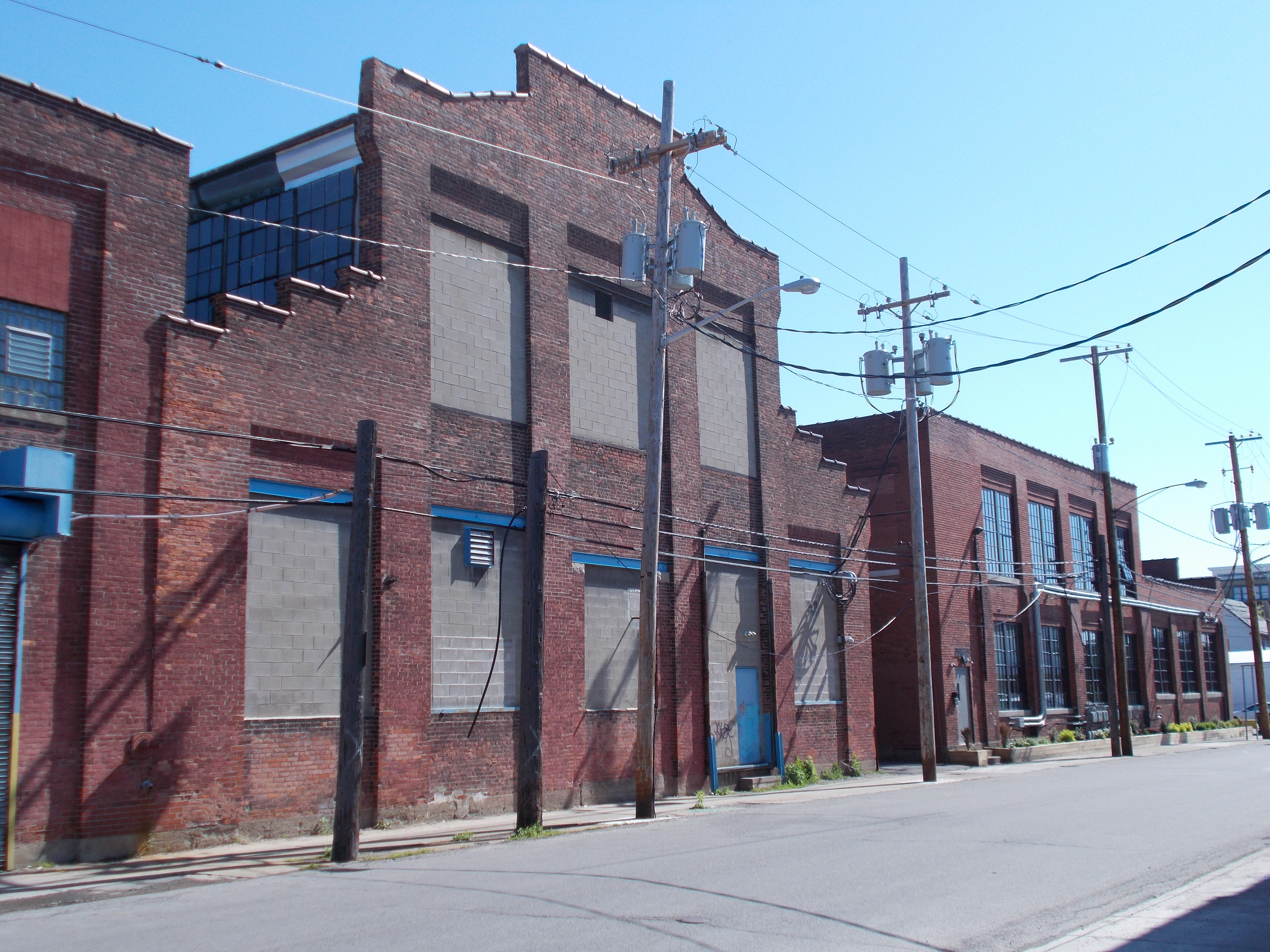
- Houk Manufacturing Co., May 2014

- Location within New York Location within the United States
- Location: 300–320 Grote St., 1686–1700 Elmwood Ave., Buffalo, New York
- Coordinates: 42°56′32″N 78°52′48″W
- Area: 4.67 acres (1.89 ha)
- Built: c. 1910-1930
- Architect: Reidpath, R. J.; Waterbury, E. H.
- Architectural style: Brick pier factory
- MPS: Historic Resources of the Black Rock Planning Neighborhood MPS
- NRHP reference No.: 14000003
- Added to NRHP: February 14, 2014

Houk Manufacturing Company, also known as Houk Wire Wheel Corporation, is a historic factory complex located at Buffalo in Erie County, New York. It consists of one- and two-story, brick factory buildings in a complex built in stages between 1910 and 1930. The original L-shaped complex built in 1910 consists of the two-story office building with an Ionic order portico, one-story machine shop, one-story warehouse, and one-story forge shop. It was listed on the National Register of Historic Places in 2014.

2013 The building was purchased by developer Rocco Termini under his company Signature Development for approximately $300,000.00 USD.

During renovations the building was designed for 22 residential units and 2 commercial units. There are 11 residential units on each floor and commercial spaces exist on the first floor on the south east corner.

A black and white wheat paste mural was added to a cylinder block wall for marketing. The mural was a nod to the art deco era when Houk Manufacturing was at its prime.

2015

By 2015 the mural was almost completely gone from deterioration due to weather and has not been replaced to date (2021).

2016

Extensive and ongoing internal leaks around the new windows were reported. It appears that red siding was added to the top of entire second floor above the windows as a way to stop the water, although it has not been returned to the historic brick that was important to maintain the integrity of the historical brick.

It appears concrete was used for repointing during the restoration which has led to deterioration of brick material.

2021

In 2021 a large painted mural was added onto the exterior historic brick outside of the commercial spaces, which also diminished the historical integrity if the brick.

2021

After several years of restoration work the Pierce Arrow building which was the beneficiary of Houk Wire Wheels was developed into the Pierce Arrow Lofts. During planning, about 100 residential units were in the works. (needs confirmation).

2022

McGuire Group Development purchased the building across from Houk Lofts for approximately $785,000.00 USD after Buerk Tool closed abruptly in 2019.

According to local news sources, the building will be turned into 33 market rate residential units and no commercial units. The modern name of the building will be the Vintage Flats according to a construction sign around the site.
