= Hooks Island =

Island in San Francisco Bay, California

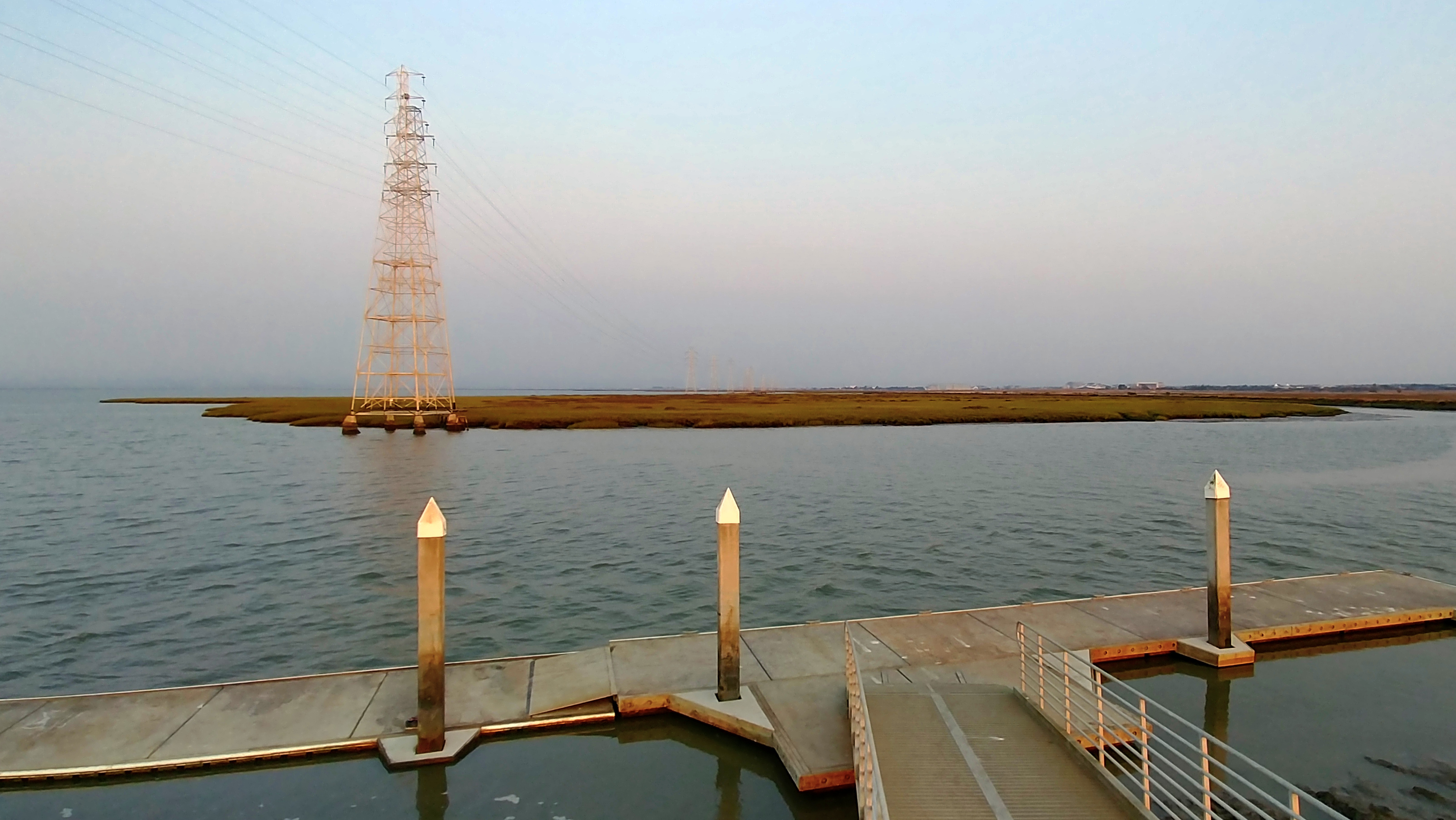
- Hooks Island as viewed from the Palo Alto Baylands Sailing Station in September 2020

- Location within San Francisco Bay Area Location within California Location within the United States

Geography
- Location: Northern California
- Coordinates: 37°27′22″N 122°05′51″W
- Adjacent to: San Francisco Bay
- Total islands: 1
- Area: 36 acres (15 ha)

Administration
- United States
- State: California
- County: Santa Clara
- City: Palo Alto

Hooks Island is an uninhabited, approximately 36-acre (15 ha) tidal salt marsh island in San Francisco Bay, in Palo Alto, California, United States. In the 2010s, it was observed to be a home for tens of near-endangered California clapper rails.

== Geography ==
Hooks Island (center) in United States Geological Survey maps over time

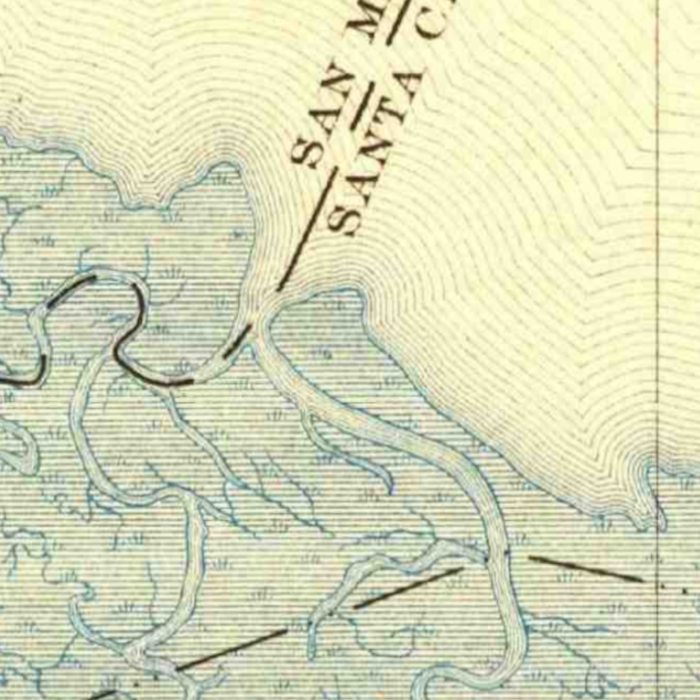
1899

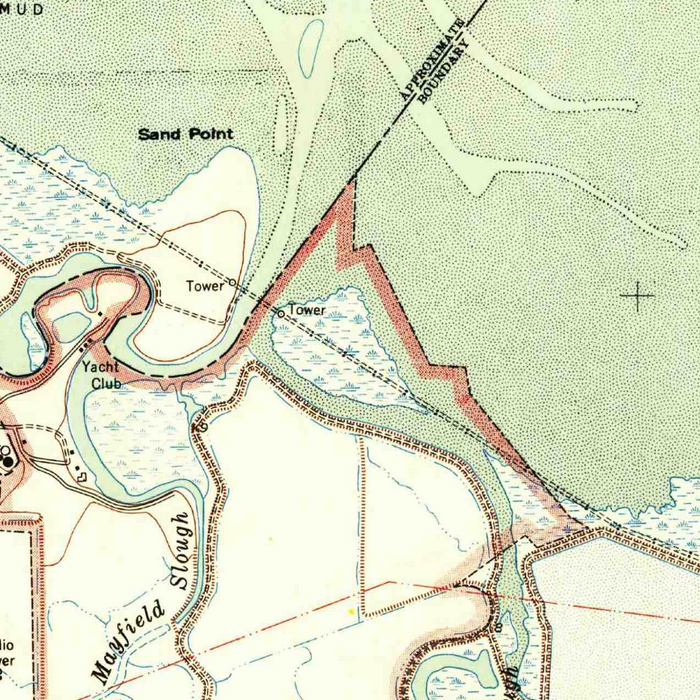
1955

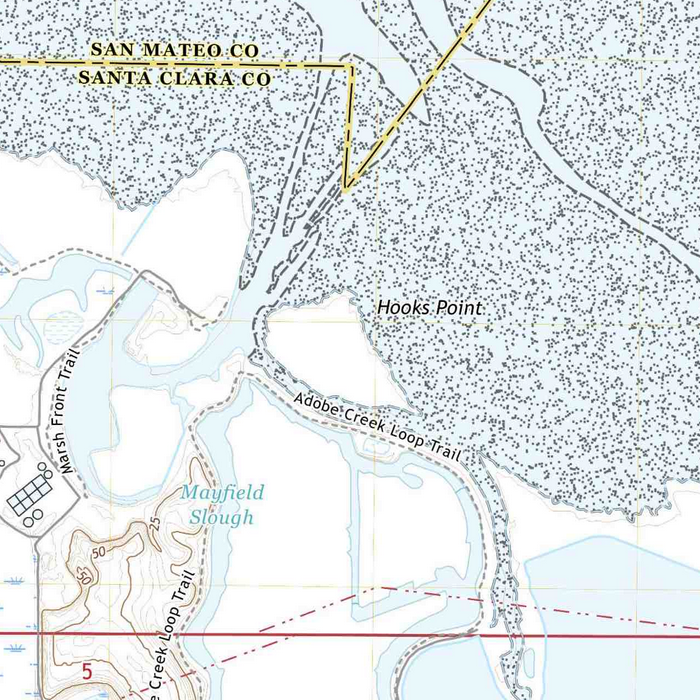
2018

Like many areas on the periphery of San Francisco Bay, Hooks Island is classified as California coastal salt marsh. As part of the Palo Alto Baylands Nature Preserve, it is a protected area, and local governments prohibit humans from traveling to it; like many parts of the San Francisco Bay Area, development (especially of housing) is not permitted.

It is home to members of several endangered species, as well as five transmission towers (belonging to the Ravenswood-Ames 115kV transmission line). It is described in a 2020 Santa Clara Valley Water report as an "undisturbed tidal salt marsh" consisting partly of an "estuarine intertidal emergent wetland". Its northern tip, located at 37°27′30″N 122°05′49″W, is known as Hooks Point. Hooks Island is located directly east of the Palo Alto Baylands Sailing Station.

== Flora ==
Several species of cord grass grow on the island and provide a habitat for various animals. In 1997, a study discovered that the native cord grass, Sporobolus foliosus, was being displaced on Hooks Island by the invasive species Spartina alterniflora, which tends to grow in denser stands than the native grass; this "makes it harder for animals to move around".

The S. alterniflora, originally introduced to the area in 1973 by an Army Corps of Engineers project to control erosion and restore marshes in the Bay, hybridized with native cord grasses, forming dense growth above ground and a dense root system below; this displaced both surface-dwelling animals and those which lived beneath the mud.

When the 1973 attempt to reverse damage to the marshes was eventually found to be harmful for wildlife, it was itself reversed—the California Coastal Conservancy's San Francisco Estuary Invasive Spartina Project was able, with the aid of the herbicide imazapyr as well as physical removal methods, to heavily reduce the overall footprint of S. alterniflora growth across a 70,000-acre (28,000 ha) "work area", from 805 acres (326 ha) in 2005 to 28 acres (11 ha) in 2016 (at which point $30 million had been spent). According to the manager of the manager of the San Francisco Bay National Wildlife Refuge Complex, the project was a "resounding success".

Despite the success of the project, however, federal officials required the conservancy to reverse part of their reversal of the initial reversal, after it was found that the (then-endangered) California clapper rail had taken up residence in thickets of the invasive species.

== Fauna ==
Numerous birds have been known to live on Hooks Island, such as the near-threatened California clapper rail. In 2011, a Point Reyes Bird Observatory Conservation Science report found that approximately 14 clapper rails had been found in the Baylands, and 19 clapper rails were "known to exist" at Palo Alto Harbor and Hooks Island. Other estimates of the total Baylands population in 2011 included "approximately 15–29 individuals". However, in 2010, there had been as many as 22 clapper rails. In 2013, allegations were made that feral cats were living on Hooks Island and killing the clapper rails. While it is broadly accepted that there are many cats in the San Francisco Bay Area, the extent of their presence in the Palo Alto Baylands (and of their role in the killing of clapper rails) was disputed. While the city's division manager of open space, parks and golf claimed to have "personally seen feral cats hunt and catch birds in the Baylands Nature Preserve", a volunteer at the Palo Alto Humane Society offered a rejoinder to this claim, stating that "compared to people, the damage feral cats do is minor".

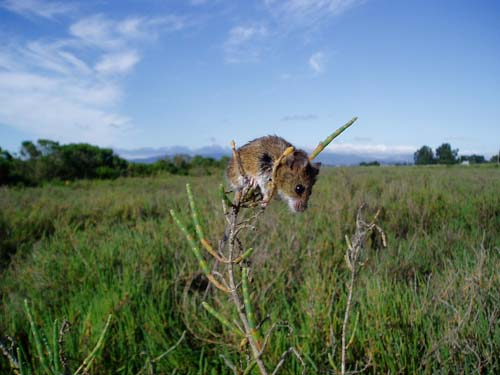
The salt marsh harvest mouse

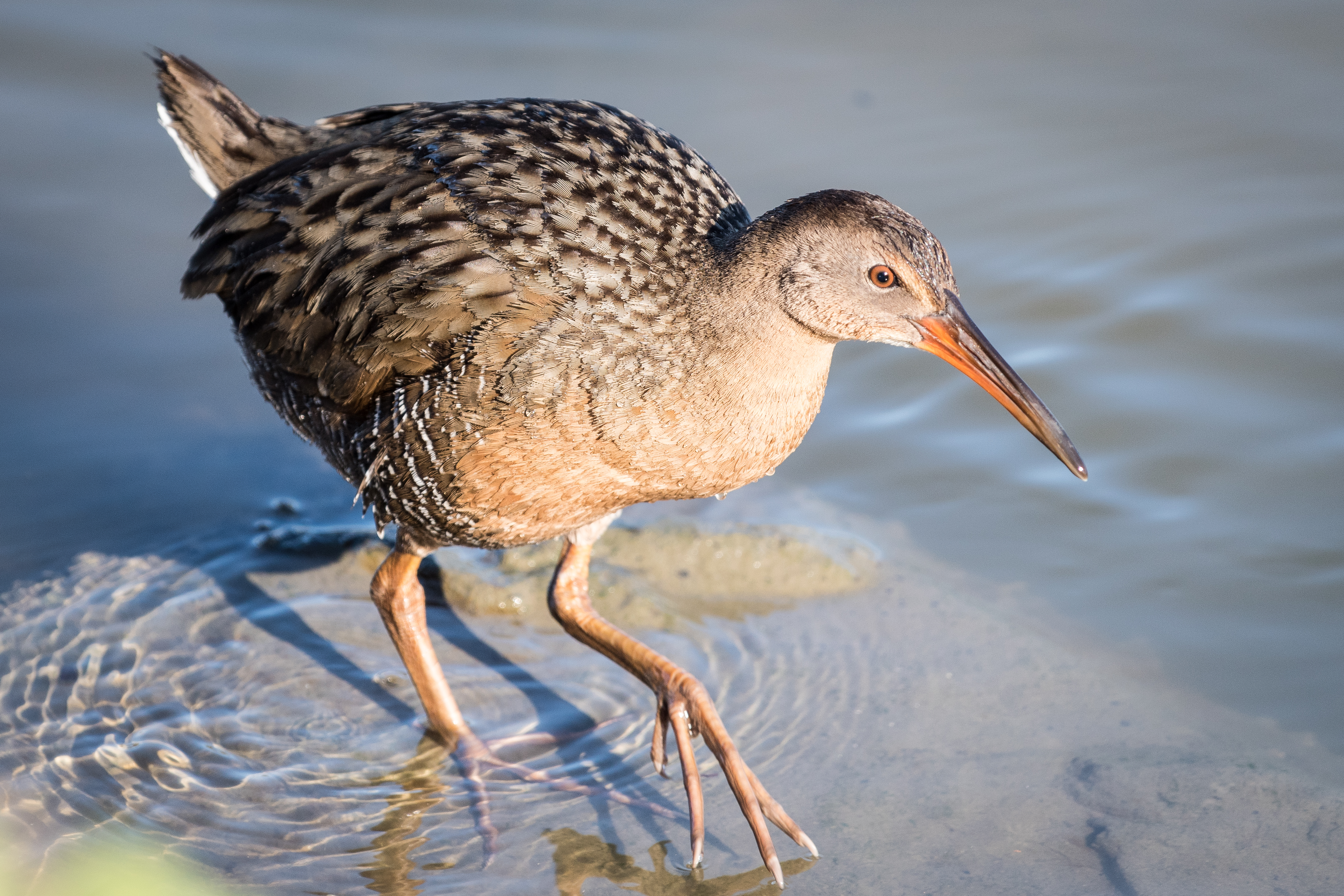
The California clapper rail

== See also ==
- List of California Department of Fish and Game protected areas
- List of islands of San Francisco Bay
- Salt marsh harvest mouse
