= Deer Creek (Santa Clara County, California) =

Deer Creek Purisima Creek on some maps
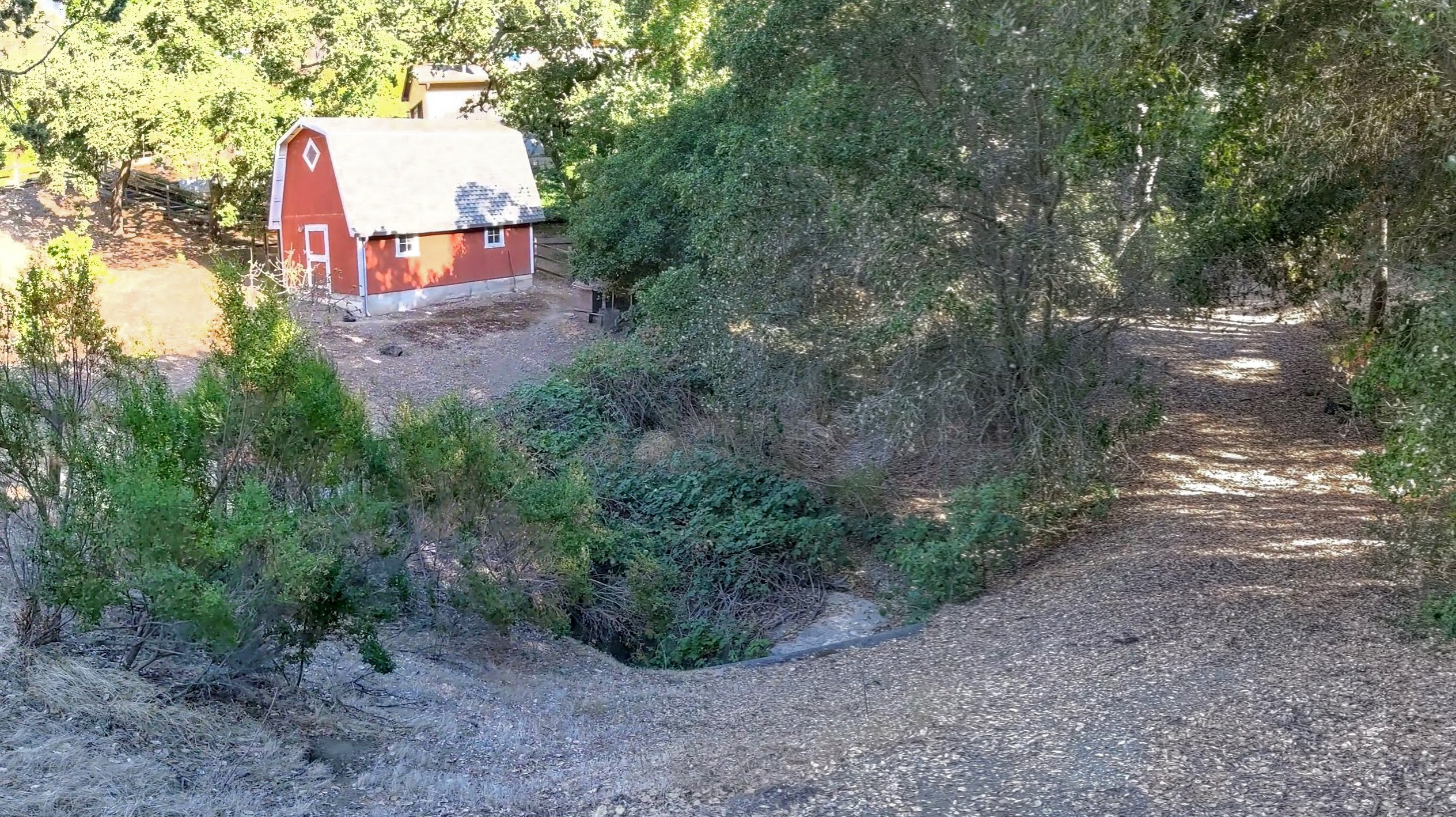
- Deer Creek at La Barranca Road, Los Altos Hills

Location
- Country: United States
- State: California
- Region: Santa Clara County

Physical characteristics
- Source: Foothills of the Santa Cruz Mountains
  - location: Los Altos Hills, California
  - coordinates: 37°21′46″N 122°08′59″W
  - elevation: 128 ft (39 m)
- Mouth: Matadero Creek
  - location: Palo Alto, California
  - coordinates: 37°24′16″N 122°09′08″W
  - elevation: 0 ft (0 m)

Deer Creek is a small stream, a right tributary of Matadero Creek, originating in the foothills of the Santa Cruz Mountains in Santa Clara County, California, United States. From its source in Los Altos Hills, the creek flows in a northerly direction for 2.5 miles (4 km)to join Matadero Creek in Palo Alto.

Deer Creek begins at elevation 680 feet just north of Altamont Road and west of Taaffe Road in Los Altos Hills, then flows northerly passing under Interstate 280 at the La Barranca Road underpass, where it turns west and parallels Purissima Road, crosses Arastradero Road and Deer Creek Road, before joining the Matadero Creek mainstem just south of Foothill Expressway and east of Page Mill Road. Deer Creek has also been labelled as Purisima Creek on some maps.

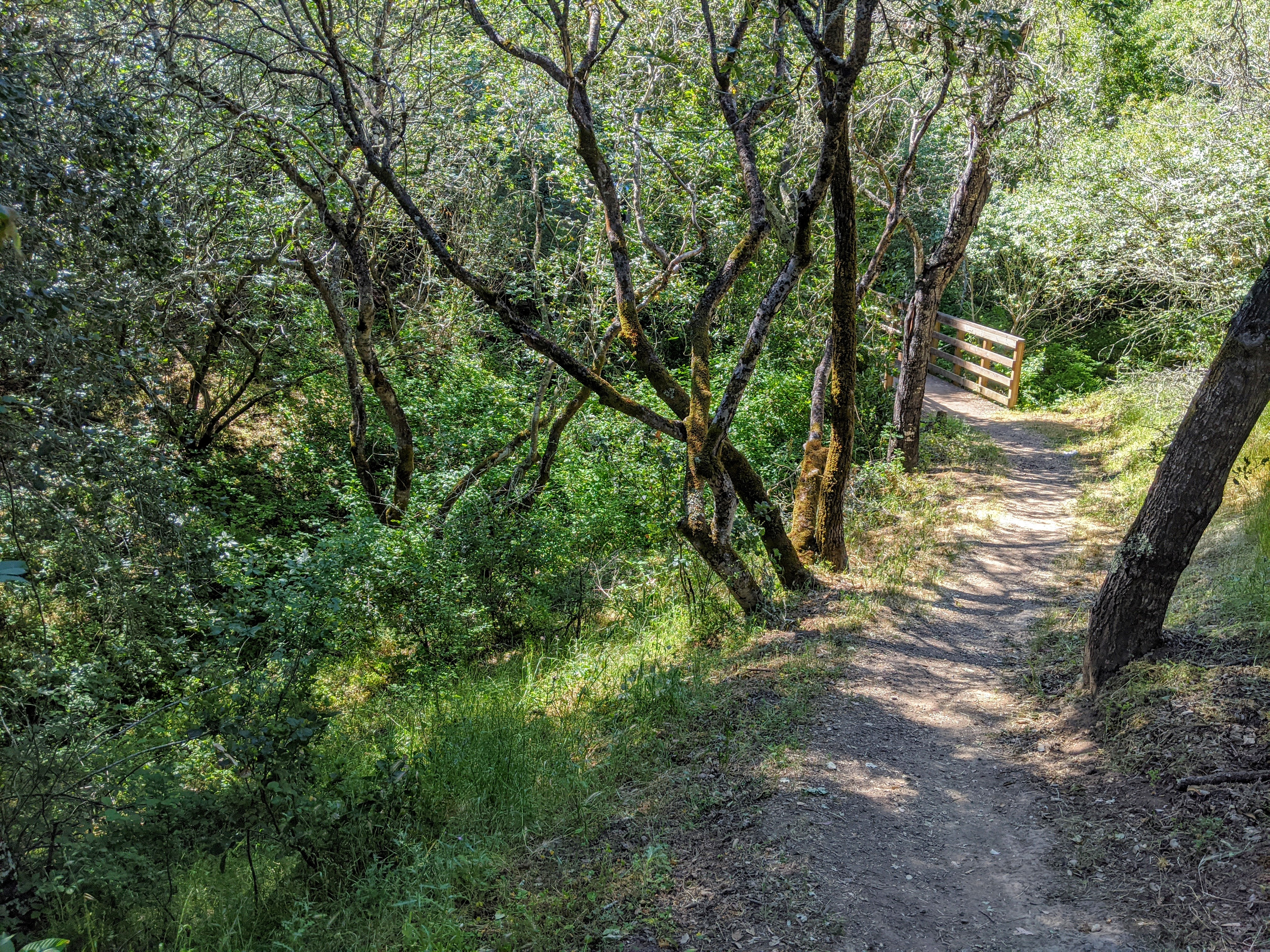
Deer Creek bridge crossing on the main stem (according to where GNIS shows the source)

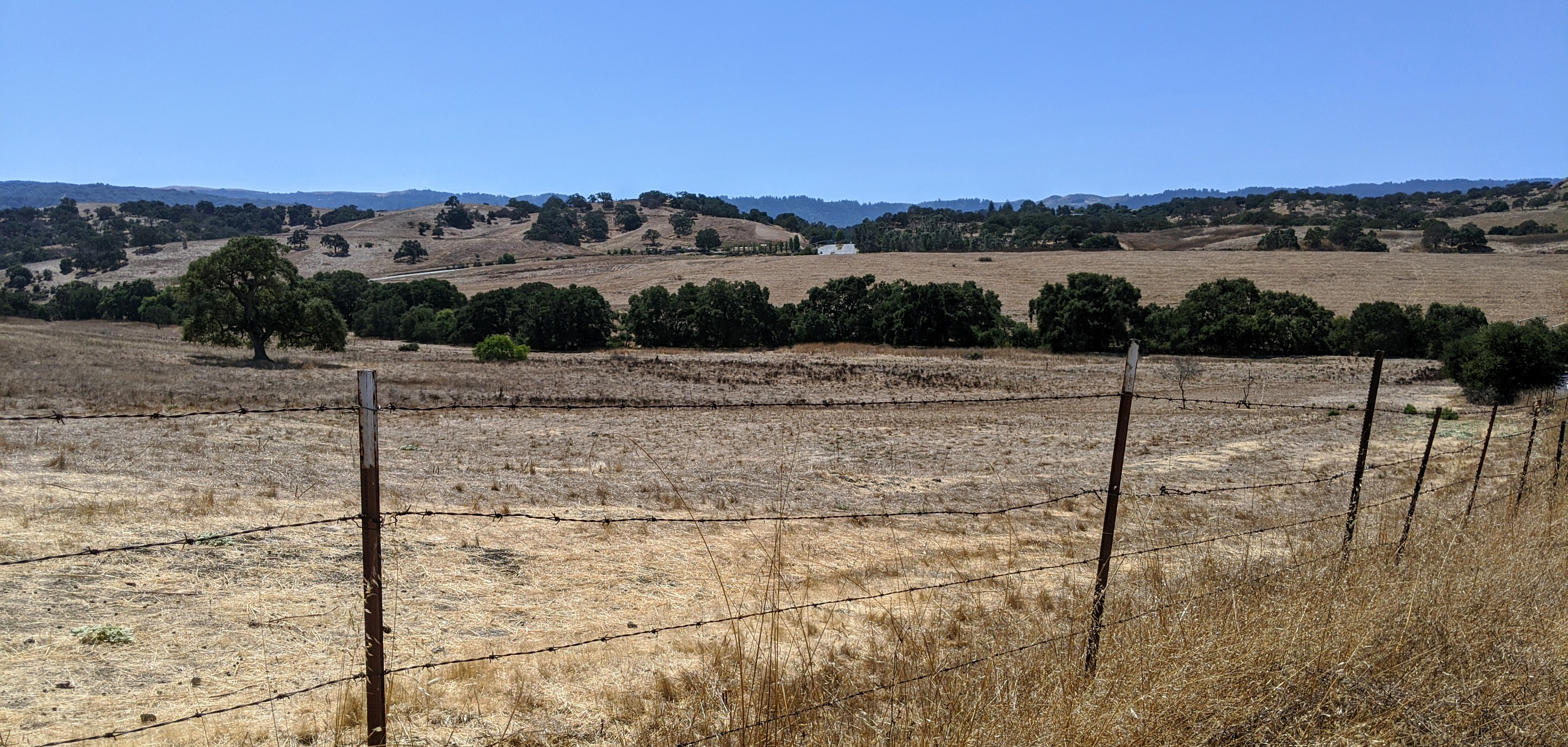
Deer Creek approaching its confluence with Matadero Creek near Foothill Expressway in Palo Alto

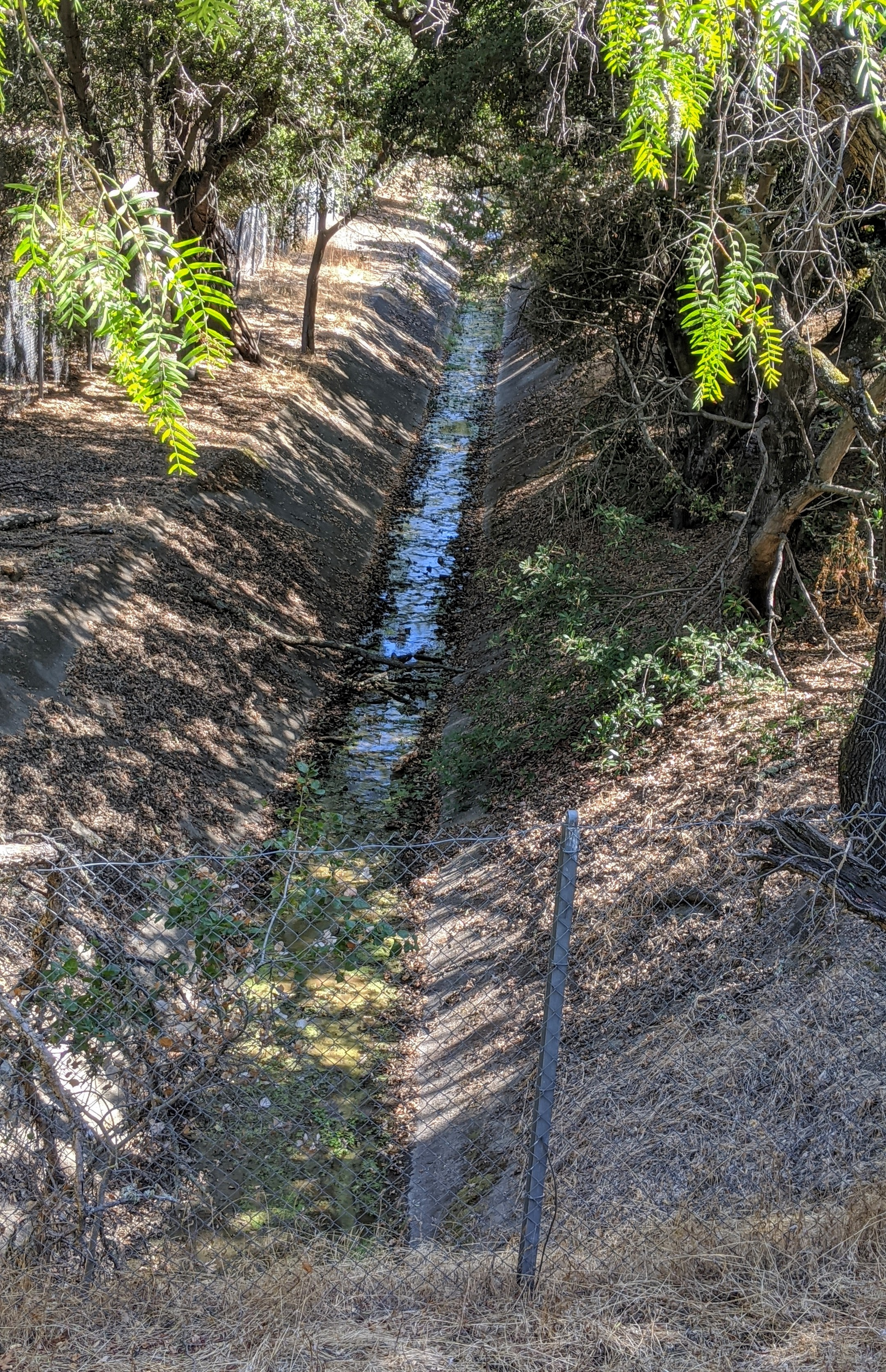
Deer Creek just east of Arastradero Road runs in a concrete trapezoidal channel along I280

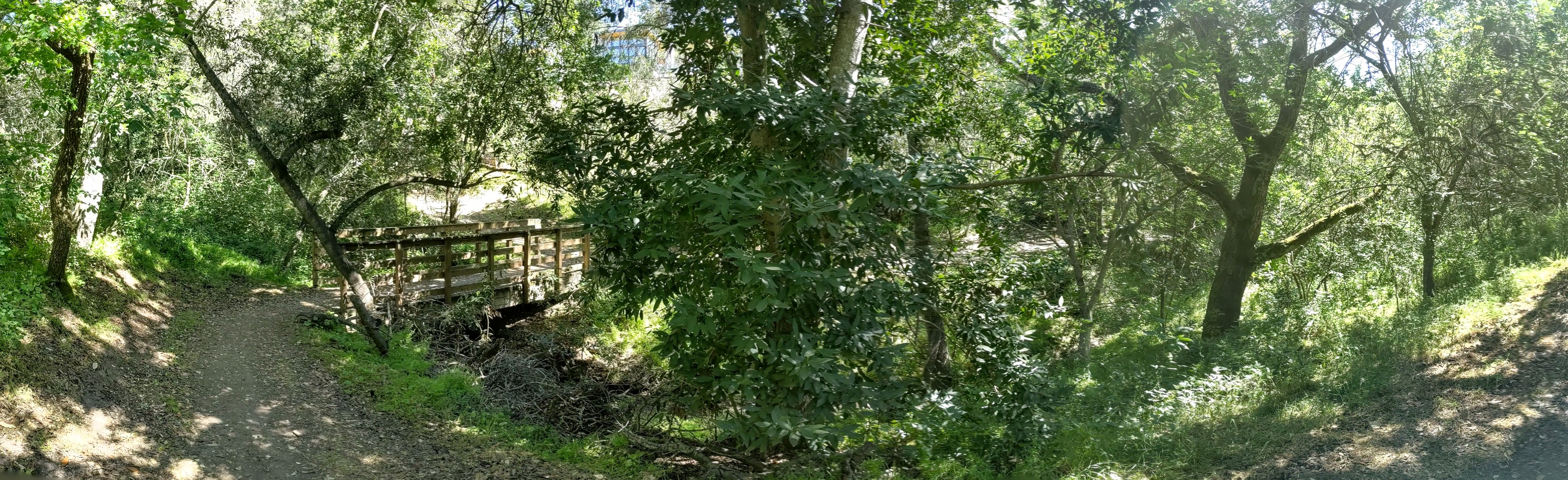
A bridge across a branch of Deer Creek near its source in Los Altos Hills. Here the pathway down from Taaffe Road, which crosses the other branch behind here, crosses to the Broken House Path.
