= Keith Houk =

American businessman

- Born: 1947 or 1948 (age 78–79)
- Education: Ohio University

Keith Houk was the president and CEO of US Airways subsidiary PSA Airlines. He joined PSA as its CEO in 1988, and became president and CEO of Allegheny Airlines, another US Airways subsidiary, in 1997. He returned to lead PSA in January, 2005. Houk is a business graduate of Ohio University and a United States Air Force veteran. In 2014, he retired from PSA after 25 years of service to the company.
