= Hook (disambiguation) =

A hook is a tool with a curved end.

Hook or The Hook may also refer to:

== Tools ==
- Hook#Variations for similar tools
  - Hook hand, prosthesis made from a hook

== Places ==
=== United Kingdom ===
- Hook, East Riding of Yorkshire, a village and civil parish
- Hook, Hart, Hampshire, a small town and civil parish
  - Hook railway station
- Hook, Fareham, Hampshire, a village
- Hook, London, a suburban area
- Hook, Pembrokeshire, a village
- Hook, Wiltshire, a small village

=== Other ===
- Hook Island, Queensland, Australia
- Hook Point, Queensland, Australia
- Hook Peninsula, County Wexford, Ireland
- Hook, New Zealand
- Hook River, New Zealand
- Hook of Holland or The Hook, a port town in the Netherlands
- Hook granite massif, Zambia

== Language ==
- Hook (diacritic), a diacritical mark attached to letters in various alphabets
- Hook above, a diacritical mark above letters in the Vietnamese alphabet
- Rhotic hook, a diacritical mark attached to symbols in the International phonetic alphabet

== Arts and entertainment ==
=== Characters ===
- Hook (Transformers), several characters in the Transformers universe
- Captain Hook, a fictional pirate in J. M. Barrie's play Peter Pan and other works
- Jonas Hook, a character created by Terry C. Johnston for a trilogy of novels
- Mr. Hook, a character in several 1940s American animated cartoon shorts produced for the US Navy
- Ryder Hook, a character created by Kenneth Bulmer under the pen name Telly Zetford for a series of novels
- Trooper Hook, the title character of Trooper Hook, a 1957 Western film, played by Joel McCrea
- Hook, a playable character in Honkai: Star Rail

=== Film ===
- Hook (film), a 1991 fantasy film by Steven Spielberg continuing J. M. Barrie's Peter and Wendy
- The Hook (1963 film), a 1963 Korean War war film
- The Hook (1976 film), a 1976 giallo film
- The Hook (2004 film), a 2004 French thriller film

=== Literature ===
- The Hook (French: L'hameçon), a 1957 novel by Vahé Katcha, basis for the 1963 film of the same title
- The Hook, a 1984 novel by Basil Copper; the 41st installment in the Mike Faraday series
- Hook, a novelization of the 1991 film by Terry Brooks
- Hook: A Novel for Young Readers, a junior novelization of the 1991 film by Geary Gravel
- The Hook, a 1996 novel by Raffaella Barker
- The Hook, a 2000 novel by Donald E. Westlake

=== Music ===
- The Hook (album), by Jukka Tolonen; and title track song
- "Hook" (Blues Traveler song), from their 1994 album, Four
- Hook (music), a catchy musical passage

=== Television ===
- Hook (2022 TV series), a program broadcast by ARY Digital
- "Hook", MacGyver (2016) season 1, episode 16 (2017)
- "The Hook", Deadliest Catch season 8, episode 4 (2012)
- "The Hook" (Poker Face), season 1, episode 10 (2023)

=== Other arts and entertainment ===
- Narrative hook, a literary technique designed to grab the reader's interest
- The Hook (screenplay), an unproduced screenplay by playwright Arthur Miller
- Hook (video game), four video games based on the Spielberg film

== Sports ==
- Hook (bowling), the second phase of bowling ball motion, following the skid phase and preceding the roll phase
- Hook (boxing), a boxing punch
- Hook (cricket), a shot in cricket
- Hook shot, a type of shot in basketball
- Hooking (ice hockey), a penalty
- Hook, part of the hook and ladder trick play in football
- Hook shot, in a type of misplayed golf shot
- Curveball, a type of baseball pitch

== People ==
- Hook (surname), a list of people
- Hook (nickname), a list of people
- Hook., author abbreviation of English botanist William Jackson Hooker (1785–1865)
- Hook.f., author abbreviation of English botanist Joseph Dalton Hooker (1817–1911), the son of William Jackson Hooker
- Harry Aleman (1939–2010), nicknamed "The Hook", American mobster for the Chicago Outfit

== Other uses ==
- Hook (computer programming), a computer programming technique
- Telephone hook, an electrical switch which indicates when the telephone has been hung up
- Mil Mi-6, a Soviet/Russian heavy transport helicopter nicknamed "Hook"
- The Hook, a classic urban legend
- The Hook (newspaper), a weekly Virginia newspaper from 2002 to 2013
- WFFM, a radio station licensed to Ashburn, Georgia, formerly branded "Hook FM"
- Angle (journalism)

== See also ==
- Hooke (disambiguation)
- Hooked (disambiguation)
- Hooks (disambiguation)
- Hook echo, a feature visible on radar indicative of tornadic rotation in a thunderstorm
