= Hook (surname) =

Hook is an English surname, originating from people who lived in the bend of a lane or valley. Notable people with the surname include:

- Chris Hook (born 1968), American baseball player and coach
- Elias Hook (1805–1881), of E. and G. G. Hook & Hastings, American organ manufacturers
- Frank Eugene Hook (1893–1982), American politician
- Geoff "Jeff" Hook (1928–2018), Australian cartoonist
- George Hook (born 1930), Irish journalist
- George Greenleaf Hook, (1807–1880), of E. and G. G. Hook & Hastings, American organ manufacturers
- Henry Hook, 1850–1905, English recipient of the Victoria Cross
- Hilary Hook (1918–1990), British soldier
- Jake Hook, English songwriter and producer
- James Hook (born 1985), Welsh rugby union player
- James Hook (1746–1827), English composer
- James Clarke Hook (1819–1907), English painter
- Jay Hook (born 1936), American baseball player
- Julian J. Hook (1941-2022), American lawyer and politician
- Maxen Hook (born 2001), American football player
- Peter Hook (born 1956) English musician
- Sidney Hook (1902–1989), American pragmatic philosopher
- Ted Hook (1910–1990), Australian public servant and lawyer
- Theodore Edward Hook (1788–1841), English author
- Walter Farquhar Hook (1798–1875), Victorian churchman

== Fictional ==
- Captain Hook, fictional character

== See also ==
- Hook (disambiguation)
- Hooke (disambiguation)
- Houk
