= Hooke =

Hooke may refer to:

- Hooke, Dorset, England
  - River Hooke, nearby watercourse
  - Hooke Court, former manor house at Hooke
  - Hooke Park, Woodland to south west of Hooke
- Robert Hooke (1635–1703), English natural philosopher who discovered Hooke's law
- Hooke (surname), a surname
- Hooke (lunar crater)
- Hooke (Martian crater)
- 3514 Hooke, asteroid

== See also ==
- Hook (disambiguation)
- Universal joint (Hooke's joint)
- Hooke's law
